= List of birds of Coquimbo Region =

This list of birds of Coquimbo Region includes species documented in the Chilean region of Coquimbo. The backbone of this list is provided by Avibase, and all additions that differ from this list have citations. As of November 2024, there are 307 recorded bird species in the region.

The following tags note species in each of those categories:

- (A) Accidental - species not regularly occurring in Coquimbo Region
- (En) Endemic to Chile - species that is only found in Chile
- (I) Introduced - species that is not native to Coquimbo Region
- (Ex) Extirpated - species that are no longer found in Coquimbo Region but are still found elsewhere

== Tinamous ==
Order: Tinamiformes Family: Tinamidae

- Chilean tinamou (Nothoprocta perdicaria) (En)
- Andean tinamou (Nothoprocta pentlandii) (Ex)

== Ducks, geese, and waterfowl ==
Order: Anseriformes Family: Anatidae

- White-faced whistling-duck (Dendrocygna viduata) (A)
- Black-bellied whistling-duck (Dendrocygna autumnalis) (A)
- Black-necked swan (Cygnus melancoryphus)
- Coscoroba swan (Coscoroba coscoroba)
- Andean goose (Oressochen melanopterus)
- Crested duck (Lophonetta specularioides)
- Spectacled duck (Speculanas specularis)
- Torrent duck (Merganetta armata)
- Silver teal (Spatula versicolor)
- Puna teal (Spatula puna) (A)
- Cinnamon teal (Spatula cyanoptera)
- Red shoveler (Spatula platalea)
- Chiloe wigeon (Mareca sibilatrix)
- White-cheeked pintail (Anas bahamensis)
- Yellow-billed pintail (Anas georgica)
- Yellow-billed teal (Anas flavirostris)
- Rosy-billed pochard (Netta peposaca)
- Black-headed duck (Heteronetta atricapilla)
- Andean duck (Oxyura ferruginea) (A)
- Lake duck (Oxyura vittata)

== New World quail ==
Order: Galliformes Family: Odontophoridae

- California quail (Callipepla californica) (I)

== Flamingos ==
Order: Phoenicopteriformes Family: Phoenicopteridae

- Chilean flamingo (Phoenicopterus chilensis)
- Andean flamingo (Phoenicoparrus andinus)
- James's flamingo (Phoenicoparrus jamesi)

== Grebes ==
Order: Podicipediformes Family: Podicipedidae

- White-tufted grebe (Rollandia rolland)
- Pied-billed grebe (Podilymbus podiceps)
- Great grebe (Podiceps major)
- Silvery grebe (Podiceps occipitalis)

== Doves and pigeons ==
Order: Columbiformes Family: Columbidae

- Rock dove (Columba livia) (I)
- Spot-winged pigeon (Patagioenas maculosa) (A)
- Chilean pigeon (Patagioenas araucana)
- Picui ground dove (Columbina picui)
- Croaking ground dove (Columbina cruziana) (A)
- Black-winged ground dove (Metriopelia melanoptera)
- Golden-spotted ground dove (Metriopelia aymara)
- West Peruvian dove (Zenaida meloda)
- Eared dove (Zenaida auriculata)

== Nightjars ==
Order: Caprimulgiformes Family: Caprimulgidae

- Band-winged nightjar (Systellura longirostris)

== Swifts ==
Order: Apodiformes Family: Apodidae

- White-collared swift (Streptoprocne zonaris) (A)
- Chimney swift (Chaetura pelagica) (A)

== Hummingbirds ==
Order: Apodiformes Family: Trochilidae

- Green-backed firecrown (Sephanoides sephaniodes)
- White-sided hillstar (Oreotrochilus leucopleurus)
- Giant hummingbird (Patagona gigas)
- Oasis hummingbird (Rhodopis vesper)

== Limpkins ==
Order: Gruiformes Family: Aramidae

- Limpkin (Aramus guarauna) (A)

== Rails ==
Order: Gruiformes Family: Rallidae

- Plumbeous rail (Pardirallus sanguinolentus)
- Spot-flanked gallinule (Porphyriops melanops)
- Common gallinule (Gallinula galeata)
- Red-fronted coot (Fulica rufifrons)
- Horned coot (Fulica cornuta)
- Red-gartered coot (Fulica armillata)
- Slate-coloured coot (Fulica ardesiaca)
- White-winged coot (Fulica leucoptera)
- Black rail (Laterallus jamaicensis)

== Stilts and avocets ==
Order: Charadriiformes Family: Recurvirostridae

- Black-necked stilt (Himantopus mexicanus)
- Andean avocet (Recurvirostra andina)

== Oystercatchers ==
Order: Charadriiformes Family: Haematopodidae

- American oystercatcher (Haematopus palliatus)
- Blackish oystercatcher (Haematopus ater)

== Plovers and Lapwings ==
Order: Charadriiformes Family: Charadriidae

- Black-bellied plover (Pluvialis squatarola)
- American golden plover (Pluvialis dominica)
- Tawny-throated dotterel (Oreopholus ruficollis)
- Diademed sandpiper-plover (Phegornis mitchellii)
- Rufous-chested dotterel (Zonibyx modestus)
- Killdeer (Charadrius vociferus) (A)
- Semipalmated plover (Charadrius semipalmatus)
- Southern lapwing (Vanellus chilensis)
- Collared plover (Anarhynchus collaris)
- Puna plover (Anarhynchus alticola)
- Two-banded plover (Anarhynchus falklandicus)
- Snowy plover (Anarhynchus nivosus)

== Seedsnipes ==
Order: Charadriiformes Family: Thinocoridae

- Rufous-bellied seedsnipe (Attagis gayi)
- Grey-breasted seedsnipe (Thinocorus orbignyianus)
- Least seedsnipe (Thinocorus rumicivorus)

== Painted-snipes ==
Order: Charadriiformes Family: Rostratulidae

- South American painted-snipe (Nycticryphes semicollaris)

== Sandpipers ==
Order: Charadriiformes Family: Scolopacidae

- Upland sandpiper (Bartramia longicauda) (A)
- Whimbrel (Numenius phaeopus)
- Hudsonian godwit (Limosa haemastica)
- Marbled godwit (Limosa fedoa)
- Short-billed dowitcher (Limnodromus griseus) (A)
- Puna snipe (Gallinago andina)
- Magellanic snipe (Gallinago magellanica)
- Wilson's phalarope (Phalaropus tricolor)
- Red phalarope (Phalaropus fulicarius)
- Spotted sandpiper (Actitis macularius)
- Lesser yellowlegs (Tringa flavipes)
- Willet (Tringa semipalmata)
- Greater yellowlegs (Tringa melanoleuca)
- Ruddy turnstone (Arenaria interpres)
- Red knot (Calidris canutus)
- Surfbird (Calidris virgata)
- Curlew sandpiper (Calidris ferruginea) (A)
- Stilt sandpiper (Calidris himantopus)
- Buff-breasted sandpiper (Calidris subruficollis) (A)
- Sanderling (Calidris alba)
- Baird's sandpiper (Calidris bairdii)
- White-rumped sandpiper (Calidris fuscicollis)
- Least sandpiper (Calidris minutilla)
- Pectoral sandpiper (Calidris melanotos)
- Western sandpiper (Calidris mauri)
- Semipalmated sandpiper (Calidris pusilla)

== Skuas and jaegers ==
Order: Charadriiformes Family: Stercorariidae

- Long-tailed jaeger (Stercorarius longicaudus)
- Parasitic jaeger (Stercorarius parasiticus)
- Pomarine jaeger (Stercorarius pomarinus)
- Chilean skua (Stercorarius chilensis)

== Gulls, terns, and skimmers ==
Order: Charadriiformes Family: Laridae

- Swallow-tailed gull (Creagrus furcatus) (A)
- Sabine's gull (Xema sabini) (A)
- Bonaparte's gull (Chroicocephalus philadelphia) (A)
- Andean gull (Chroicocephalus serranus)
- Brown-hooded gull (Chroicocephalus maculipennis)
- Grey gull (Leucophaeus modestus)
- Laughing gull (Leucophaeus atricilla) (A)
- Franklin's gull (Leucophaeus pipixcan)
- Belcher's gull (Larus belcheri)
- Kelp gull (Larus dominicanus)
- Black skimmer (Rynchops niger)
- Brown noddy (Anous stolidus) (A)
- Sooty tern (Onychoprion fuscatus) (A)
- Least tern (Sternula antillarum) (A)
- Inca tern (Larosterna inca)
- Snowy-crowned tern (Sterna trudeaui)
- Arctic tern (Sterna paradisaea)
- South American tern (Sterna hirundinacea)
- Common tern (Sterna hirundo)
- Sandwich tern (Thalasseus sandvicensis)
- Elegant tern (Thalasseus elegans)

== Tropicbirds ==
Order: Phaethontiformes Family: Phaethontidae

- Red-billed tropicbird (Phaethon aethereus) (A)

== Penguins ==
Order: Sphenisciformes Family: Spheniscidae

- Humboldt penguin (Spheniscus humboldti)
- Magellanic penguin (Spheniscus magellanicus)
- Southern rockhopper penguin (Eudyptes chrysocome) (A)

== Albatrosses ==
Order: Procellariiformes Family: Diomedeidae

- Northern royal albatross (Diomedea sanfordi)
- Southern royal albatross (Diomedea epomophora)
- Snowy albatross (Diomedea exulans)
- Waved albatross (Phoebastria irrorata) (A)
- Buller's albatross (Thalassarche bulleri)
- White-capped albatross (Thalassarche cauta) (A)
- Salvin's albatross (Thalassarche salvini)
- Chatham albatross (Thalassarche eremita)
- Black-browed albatross (Thalassarche melanophris)

== Southern storm petrels ==
Order: Procellariiformes Family: Oceanitidae

- Wilson's storm-petrel (Oceanites oceanicus)
- Elliot's storm-petrel (Oceanites gracilis)
- White-bellied storm-petrel (Fregetta grallaria)
- Black-bellied storm-petrel (Fregetta tropica)

== Northern storm petrels ==
Order: Procellariiformes Family: Hydrobatidae

- Ringed storm-petrel (Hydrobates hornbyi)

== Petrels and shearwaters ==
Order: Procellariiformes Family: Procellariidae

- Southern giant-petrel (Macronectes giganteus)
- Northern giant-petrel (Macronectes halli)
- Southern fulmar (Fulmarus glacialoides)
- Cape petrel (Daption capense)
- Grey-faced petrel (Pterodroma gouldi) (A)
- Juan Fernandez petrel (Pterodroma externa) (En)
- Masatierra petrel (Pterodroma defilippiana)
- Stejneger's petrel (Pterodroma longirostris) (En)
- Broad-billed prion (Pachyptila vittata) (A)
- Antarctic prion (Pachyptila desolata)
- Slender-billed prion (Pachyptila belcheri)
- Grey petrel (Procellaria cinerea)
- White-chinned petrel (Procellaria aequinoctialis)
- Westland petrel (Procellaria westlandica)
- Pink-footed shearwater (Ardenna creatopus)
- Buller's shearwater (Ardenna bulleri)
- Sooty shearwater (Ardenna grisea)
- Manx shearwater (Puffinus puffinus) (A)
- Peruvian diving-petrel (Pelecanoides garnotii)

== Storks ==
Order: Pelecaniformes Family: Ciconiidae

- Wood stork (Mycteria americana) (A)

== Frigatebirds ==
Order: Pelecaniformes Family: Fregatidae

- Magnificent frigatebird (Fregata magnificens) (A)

== Boobies and gannets ==
Order: Pelecaniformes Family: Sulidae

- Cocos booby (Sula brewsteri) (A)
- Masked booby (Sula dactylatra)
- Blue-footed booby (Sula nebouxii) (A)
- Peruvian booby (Sula variegata)

== Cormorants ==
Order: Pelecaniformes Family: Phalacrocoracidae

- Red-legged cormorant (Poikilocarbo gaimardi)
- Neotropic cormorant (Phalacrocorax brasilianum)
- Guanay cormorant (Leucocarbo bougainvillii)

== Pelicans ==
Order: Pelecaniformes Family: Pelecanidae

- Brown pelican (Pelecanus occidentalis) (A)
- Peruvian pelican (Pelecanus thagus)

== Herons and egrets ==
Order: Pelecaniformes Family: Ardeidae

- Stripe-backed bittern (Ixobrychus involucris)
- Black-crowned night-heron (Nycticorax nycticorax)
- Little blue heron (Egretta caerulea)
- Tricoloured heron (Egretta tricolor) (A)
- Snowy egret (Egretta thula)
- Striated heron (Butorides striata) (A)
- Western cattle egret (Bubulcus ibis)
- Great egret (Ardea alba)
- Cocoi heron (Ardea cocoi)

== Ibises and spoonbills ==
Order: Pelecaniformes Family: Threskiornithidae

- White-faced ibis (Plegadis chihi)
- Black-faced ibis (Theristicus melanopis)

== New World vultures ==
Order: Cathartiformes Family: Cathartidae

- Turkey vulture (Cathartes aura)
- Black vulture (Coragyps atratus)
- Andean condor (Vultur gryphus)

== Ospreys ==
Order: Accipitriformes Family: Pandionidae

- Osprey (Pandion haliaetus)

== Hawks, kites, and eagles ==
Order: Accipitriformes Family: Accipitridae

- White-tailed kite (Elanus leucurus)
- Long-winged harrier (Circus buffoni) (A)
- Cinereous harrier (Circus cinereus)
- Chilean hawk (Astur chilensis)
- Harris's hawk (Parabuteo unicinctus)
- Variable hawk (Geranoaetus polyosoma)
- Black-chested buzzard-eagle (Geranoaetus melanoleucus)
- White-throated hawk (Buteo albigula)

== Barn owls ==
Order: Strigiformes Family: Tytonidae

- American barn owl (Tyto furcata)

== Owls ==
Order: Strigiformes Family: Strigidae

- Lesser horned owl (Bubo magellanicus)
- Austral pygmy-owl (Glaucidium nana)
- Burrowing owl (Athene cunicularia)
- Rufous-legged owl (Strix rufipes)
- Short-eared owl (Asio flammeus)

== Woodpeckers ==
Order: Piciformes Family: Picidae

- Striped woodpecker (Dryobates lignarius)
- Chilean flicker (Colaptes pitius)

== Falcons ==
Order: Falconiformes Family: Falconidae

- Crested caracara (Caracara plancus)
- Chimango caracara (Daptrius chimango)
- Mountain caracara (Daptrius megalopterus)
- American kestrel (Falco sparverius)
- Aplomado falcon (Falco femoralis)
- Peregrine falcon (Falco peregrinus)

== Parrots ==
Order: Psittaciformes Family: Psittacidae

- Mountain parakeet (Psilopsiagon aurifrons)
- Monk parakeet (Myiopsitta monachus) (I)
- Burrowing parakeet (Cyanoliseus patagonus)

== Tapaculos ==
Order: Passeriformes Family: Rhinocryptidae

- Moustached turca (Pteroptochos megapodius) (En)
- White-throated tapaculo (Scelorchilus albicollis) (En)
- Dusky tapaculo (Scytalopus fuscus) (En)
- Magellanic tapaculo (Scytalopus magellanicus)

== Ovenbirds ==
Order: Passeriformes Family: Furnariidae

- Common miner (Geositta cunicularia)
- Rufous-banded miner (Geositta rufipennis)
- Greyish miner (Geositta maritima)
- Creamy-rumped miner (Geositta isabellina)
- White-throated treerunner (Pygarrhichas albogularis)
- Straight-billed earthcreeper (Ochetorhynchus ruficaudus)
- Crag chilia (Ochetorhynchus melanurus) (En)
- Wren-like rushbird (Phleocryptes melanops)
- Patagonian forest earthcreeper (Upucerthia saturatior)
- Scale-throated earthcreeper (Upucerthia dumetaria)
- Buff-winged cinclodes (Cinclodes fuscus)
- Grey-flanked cinclodes (Cinclodes oustaleti)
- White-winged cinclodes (Cinclodes atacamensis)
- Dark-bellied cinclodes (Cinclodes patagonicus)
- Seaside cinclodes (Cinclodes nigrofumosus) (En)
- Thorn-tailed rayadito (Aphrastura spinicauda)
- Des Murs's wiretail (Sylviorthorhynchus desmursii)
- Plain-mantled tit-spinetail (Leptasthenura aegithaloides)
- Austral canastero (Asthenes anthoides) (A)
- Cordilleran canastero (Asthenes modesta)
- Sharp-billed canastero (Asthenes pyrrholeuca)
- Dusky-tailed canastero (Pseudasthenes humicola) (En)

== Cotingas ==
Order: Passeriformes Family: Cotingidae

- Rufous-tailed plantcutter (Phytotoma rara)

== Tyrant flycatchers ==
Order: Passeriformes Family: Tyrannidae

- Many-coloured rush-tyrant (Tachuris rubrigastra)
- Tufted tit-tyrant (Anairetes parulus)
- White-crested elaenia (Elaenia albiceps)
- Vermilion flycatcher (Pyrocephalus rubinus) (A)
- Austral negrito (Lessonia rufa)
- Andean negrito (Lessonia oreas)
- White-winged black-tyrant (Knipolegus aterrimus) (A)
- Spectacled tyrant (Hymenops perspicillatus)
- Spot-billed ground-tyrant (Muscisaxicola maculirostris)
- Cinereous ground-tyrant (Muscisaxicola cinereus)
- Ochre-naped ground-tyrant (Muscisaxicola flavinucha)
- Rufous-naped ground-tyrant (Muscisaxicola rufivertex)
- Dark-faced ground-tyrant (Muscisaxicola maclovianus)
- White-browed ground-tyrant (Muscisaxicola albilora)
- Cinnamon-bellied ground-tyrant (Muscisaxicola capistratus)
- Black-fronted ground-tyrant (Muscisaxicola frontalis)
- Fire-eyed diucon (Pyrope pyrope)
- Black-billed shrike-tyrant (Agriornis montanus)
- Great shrike-tyrant (Agriornis lividus)
- Grey-bellied shrike-tyrant (Agriornis micropterus) (A)
- Patagonian tyrant (Colorhamphus parvirostris)
- Great kiskadee (Pitangus sulphuratus) (A)
- Tropical kingbird (Tyrannus melancholicus) (A)
- Eastern kingbird (Tyrannus tyrannus) (A)
- Fork-tailed flycatcher (Tyrannus savana) (A)

== Swallows and martins ==
Order: Passeriformes Family: Hirundinidae

- Bank swallow (Riparia riparia)
- Chilean swallow (Tachycineta leucopyga)
- Blue-and-white swallow (Pygochelidon cyanoleuca)
- Barn swallow (Hirundo rustica)
- Cliff swallow (Petrochelidon pyrrhonota) (A)

== Wrens ==
Order: Passeriformes Family: Troglodytidae

- Southern house wren (Troglodytes musculus)
- Grass wren (Cistothorus platensis)

== Mockingbirds, thrashers, and allies ==
Order: Passeriformes Family: Mimidae

- Chilean mockingbird (Mimus thenca) (En)
- Patagonian mockingbird (Mimus patagonicus)
- Chalk-browed mockingbird (Mimus saturninus) (A)
- White-banded mockingbird (Mimus triurus) (A)

== Thrushes ==
Order: Passeriformes Family: Turdidae

- Austral thrush (Turdus falcklandii)
- Creamy-bellied thrush (Turdus amaurochalinus) (A)
- Chiguanco thrush (Turdus chiguanco)

== Old World sparrows ==
Order: Passeriformes Family: Passeridae

- House sparrow (Passer domesticus) (I)

== Wagtails and pipits ==
Order: Passeriformes Family: Motacillidae

- White wagtail (Motacilla alba) (A)
- Correndera pipit (Anthus correndera)

== Finches ==
Order: Passeriformes Family: Fringillidae

- Thick-billed siskin (Spinus crassirostris)
- Black siskin (Spinus atratus)
- Yellow-rumped siskin (Spinus uropygialis)
- Black-chinned siskin (Spinus barbatus)

== New World sparrows ==
Order: Passeriformes Family: Passerellidae

- Rufous-collared sparrow (Zonotrichia capensis)

== Icterids ==
Order: Passeriformes Family: Icteridae

- White-browed meadowlark (Leistes superciliaris) (A)
- Long-tailed meadowlark (Leistes loyca)
- Variable oriole (Icterus pyrrhopterus) (A)
- Shiny cowbird (Molothrus bonariensis)
- Austral blackbird (Curaeus curaeus)
- Yellow-winged blackbird (Agelasticus thilius)

== South American tanagers ==
Order: Passeriformes Family: Thraupidae

- Black-hooded sierra finch (Phrygilus atriceps)
- Grey-hooded sierra finch (Phrygilus gayi)
- Patagonian sierra finch (Phrygilus patagonicus)
- Diuca finch (Diuca diuca)
- Plumbeous sierra finch (Geospizopsis unicolor)
- Mourning sierra finch (Rhopospina fruticeti)
- Band-tailed sierra finch (Rhopospina alaudina)
- Bright-rumped yellow-finch (Sicalis uropygialis)
- Greater yellow-finch (Sicalis auriventris)
- Greenish yellow-finch (Sicalis olivascens)
- Grassland yellow-finch (Sicalis luteola)
- Blue-black grassquit (Volatinia jacarina)
