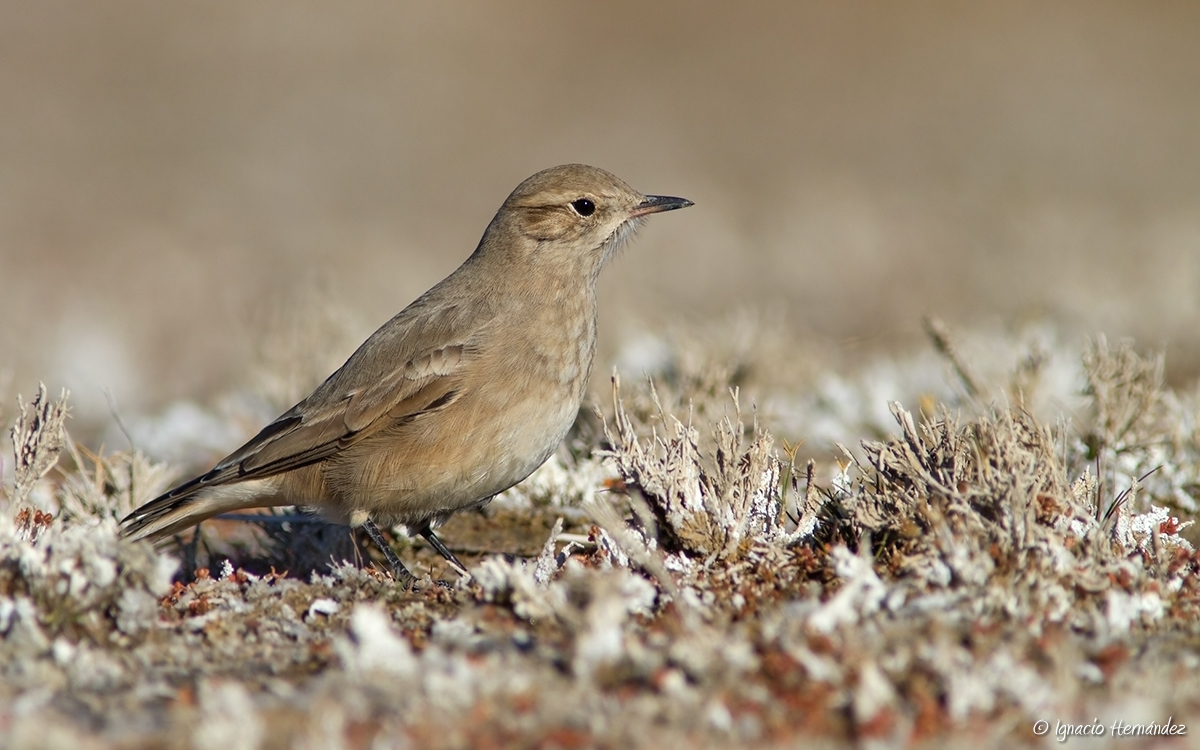

Conservation status
- Least Concern (IUCN 3.1)

Scientific classification
- Kingdom: Animalia
- Phylum: Chordata
- Class: Aves
- Order: Passeriformes
- Family: Furnariidae
- Genus: Geositta
- Species: G. antarctica

Binomial name
- Geositta antarctica Landbeck, 1880

= Short-billed miner =

Species of bird

The short-billed miner (Geositta antarctica) is a species of bird in the subfamily Sclerurinae, the leaftossers and miners, of the ovenbird family Furnariidae. It is found in Argentina and Chile.

== Taxonomy and systematics ==
The short-billed miner is monotypic. Though it looks very similar to the widespread common miner (G. cunicularia), its closest relative is the creamy-rumped miner (G. isabellina).

== Description ==
The short-billed miner is a medium-size member of its genus. It is 15 to 16 cm (5.9 to 6.3 in) long and weighs 34 to 40 g (1.2 to 1.4 oz). The sexes are alike. Adults have a dull grayish brown face with a pale supercilium and a darker line behind the eye. Their upperparts are mostly grayish brown with whitish uppertail coverts. Their tail's inner feathers are blackish brown and the outer three pairs of feathers are mostly whitish. Their wings are dark brown with a vague grayish band. Their underparts are dull whitish with light buff-brown streaks on the breast. Their iris is brown, their short bill is blackish with a paler base to the mandible, and their legs and feet are blackish. Juveniles have pale tips on the crown feathers and fainter streaks on the breast than adults. It shares part of its range with the common miner but differs in its much shorter bill and the absence of any rufous in the flight feathers.

== Distribution and habitat ==
The short-billed miner is one of the world's most southerly breeding passerines. It mostly breeds in Argentina on Tierra del Fuego. It also breeds in lesser numbers on the mainland in the southern part of Argentina's Santa Cruz Province and in southern Chile's Magallanes Region. In the non-breeding season some move north in western Argentina as far as Mendoza Province.

The short-billed miner inhabits the Patagonian Steppe, a landscape of barren plains with sparse grasses and scattered shrubs. It also occurs in more temperate grasslands and in sandy coastal areas. In elevation it ranges from sea level to 1,000 m (3,300 ft).

== Behavior ==
=== Movement ===
The short-billed miner is a year-round resident on Tierra del Fuego and the southern mainland. Some individuals move further north in Argentina after breeding.

=== Feeding ===
The short-billed miner usually forages singly or in pairs. It feeds by gleaning arthropods and seeds from the ground.

=== Breeding ===
The short-billed miner breeds in the austral summer, roughly including November to January. It is assumed to be monogamous. It nests in a tunnel excavated in the side of a dune or earthen bank; a nest chamber at the end is floored with grasses. The clutch size is three eggs. It has been reported to nest in loose colonies with other Furnariidae species.

=== Vocalization ===
The short-billed miner's song is a "series of doubled notes, 'weetuk-weetuk-weetuk-weetuk-weetuk' ". Its flight call is "a shrill 'tjeek, de trrrit, trritrritrritrritrrie' ".

== Status ==
The IUCN has assessed the short-billed miner as being of Least Concern. It has a fairly large range, and though its population size is not known it is believed to be stable. No immediate threats have been identified, though changes in its habitat due to climate change might affect the species in the future. It is considered fairly common to abundant. Its "[h]abitat occupied appears to be reasonably safe from anthropogenic disturbances, with the exception of overgrazing."
