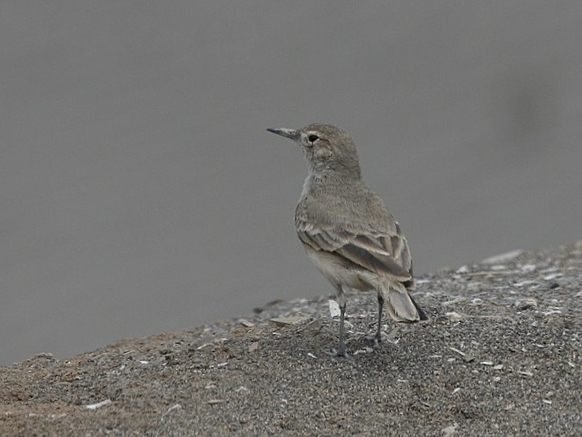

Conservation status
- Least Concern (IUCN 3.1)

Scientific classification
- Kingdom: Animalia
- Phylum: Chordata
- Class: Aves
- Order: Passeriformes
- Family: Furnariidae
- Genus: Geositta
- Species: G. peruviana

Binomial name
- Geositta peruviana Lafresnaye, 1847

= Coastal miner =

Species of bird

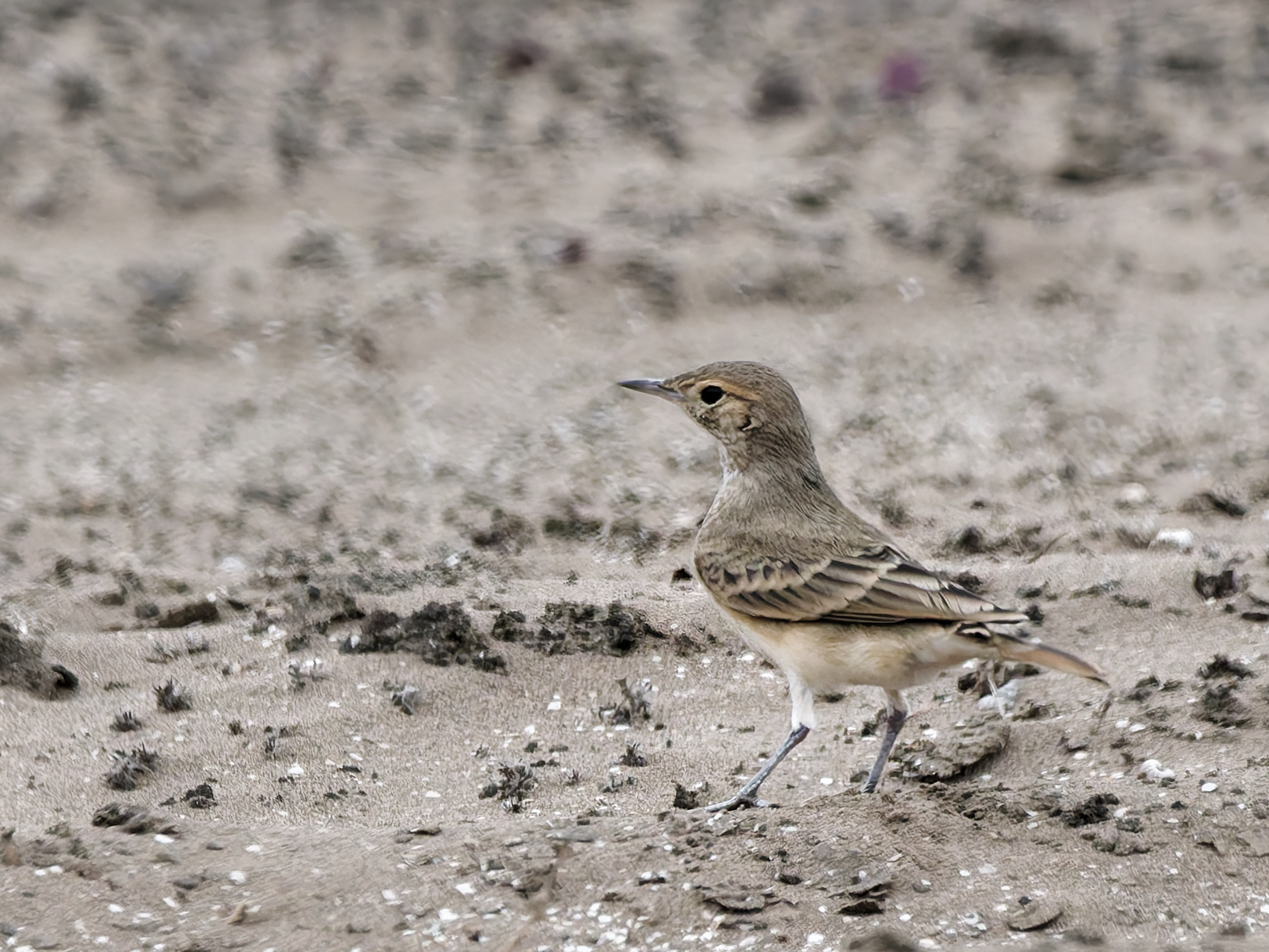
Coastal Miner in Peru

The coastal miner (Geositta peruviana) is a species of bird in the subfamily Sclerurinae, the leaftossers and miners, of the ovenbird family Furnariidae. It is endemic to Peru.

== Taxonomy and systematics ==
The coastal miner has three subspecies, the nominate G. p. peruviana Lafresnaye, 1847, G. p. paytae Ménégaux & Hellmayr, 1906, and G. p. rostrata Stolzmann, 1926.

Among the members of genus Geositta the coastal miner is most closely related to the common miner (G. cunicularia) and slender-billed miner (G. tenuirostris).

== Description ==
The coastal miner is a small member of its genus. It is 12 to 14.5 cm (4.7 to 5.7 in) long and weighs 16 to 19 g (0.56 to 0.67 oz). The sexes are alike. The nominate subspecies has pale brown upperparts with slightly paler uppertail coverts; the other two subspecies are a lighter pale sandy brown above. Their central pair of tail feathers are brown and sandy brown respectively. In all subspecies the next three pairs are black with narrow creamy white tips, the next pair are mostly blackish brown, and the outermost pair have a creamy white outer web and a pale rufous inner web with a dark band near the creamy tip. Their flight feathers are mostly pale rufous or tawny buff with dusky tips and a buffy band that is visible in flight. Their face has a pale supercilium. Their underparts are creamy white. Their iris is dark brown, their bill is blue-gray with a black outer third, and their legs whitish gray to greenish silver.

== Distribution and habitat ==
The coastal miner is endemic to Peru. Subspecies G. p. paytae is the northernmost; it is found in the northwest between the departments of Tumbes and Ancash. The nominate subspecies is found in central Peru from Ancash south to Lima. G. p. rostrata is found only in the southwestern Department of Ica. The species inhabits open sandy areas of the coastal plain, from seaside dunes inland almost to the base of the Andes. In elevation it ranges from sea level to 700 m (2,300 ft).

== Behavior ==
=== Movement ===
The coastal miner is a year-round resident throughout its range. It is almost exclusively terrestrial though it may perch above the ground on low vegetation or walls.

=== Feeding ===
Almost nothing is known about the coastal miner's foraging technique or diet. It is assumed to feed mostly on terrestrial invertebrates.

=== Breeding ===
Only one nest of a coastal miner is known. It was in an enlarged chamber at the end of a tunnel and contained two eggs.

=== Vocalization ===
As of early 2023, xeno-canto had only three recordings of coastal miner vocalizations; the Cornell Lab of Ornithology's Macaulay Library had seven. The species sings "an unmusical pjee-aww" during its display flight. It also makes "a squeaky cueet" call.

== Status ==
The IUCN has assessed the coastal miner as being of Least Concern. It has a large range, and though its population size is not known it is believed to be stable. No immediate threats have been identified. "[The] unsuitability of most of its habitat for use by humans insulates this species from most threats."
