= G. maritima =

G. maritima may refer to:

- Geositta maritima, the greyish miner, a bird species found in Chile and Peru
- Glaux maritima, a flowering plant species

== See also ==
- Maritima (disambiguation)
