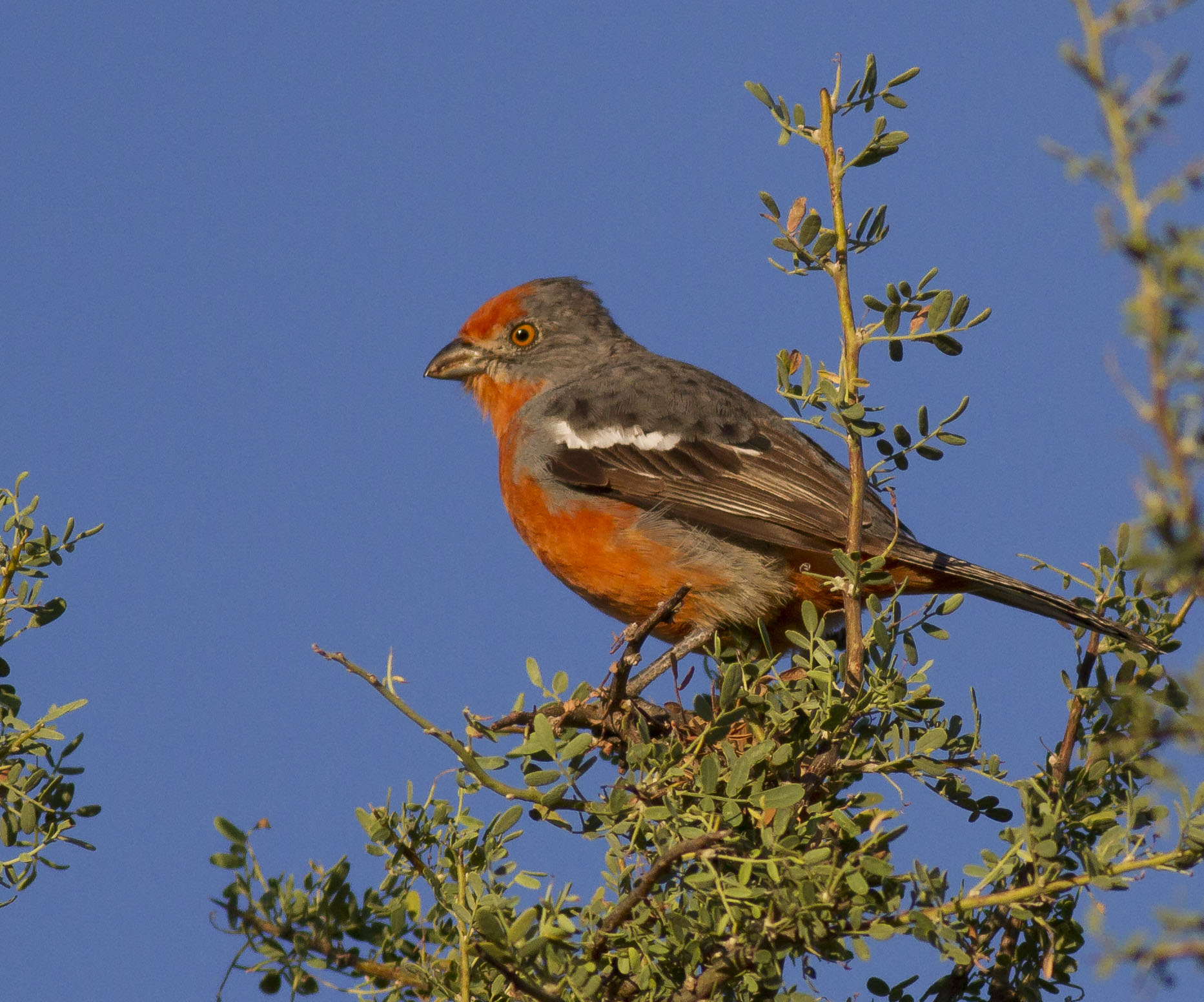

Conservation status
- Least Concern (IUCN 3.1)

Scientific classification
- Kingdom: Animalia
- Phylum: Chordata
- Class: Aves
- Order: Passeriformes
- Family: Cotingidae
- Genus: Phytotoma
- Species: P. rutila

Binomial name
- Phytotoma rutila Vieillot, 1818
- Year-round Non-Breeding

= White-tipped plantcutter =

Species of bird

The white-tipped plantcutter (Phytotoma rutila) is a species of bird in the family Cotingidae, the cotingas. It is found in Argentina, Bolivia, Paraguay, Uruguay, and as a vagrant to Brazil and Chile.

== Taxonomy and systematics ==
For part of the twentieth century the genus Phytotoma was placed in its own family Phytotomidae but subsequent genetic testing proved that it belonged in its current Cotinga family. The white-tipped plantcutter shares genus Phytotoma with the Peruvian plantcutter (P. raimondii) and rufous-tailed plantcutter (P. rara). It and the Peruvian are sister species.

The white-tipped plantcutter has two subspecies, the nominate P. r. rutila (Vieillot, 1818) and P. r. angustirostris (d'Orbigny & Lafresnaye, 1837).

== Description ==
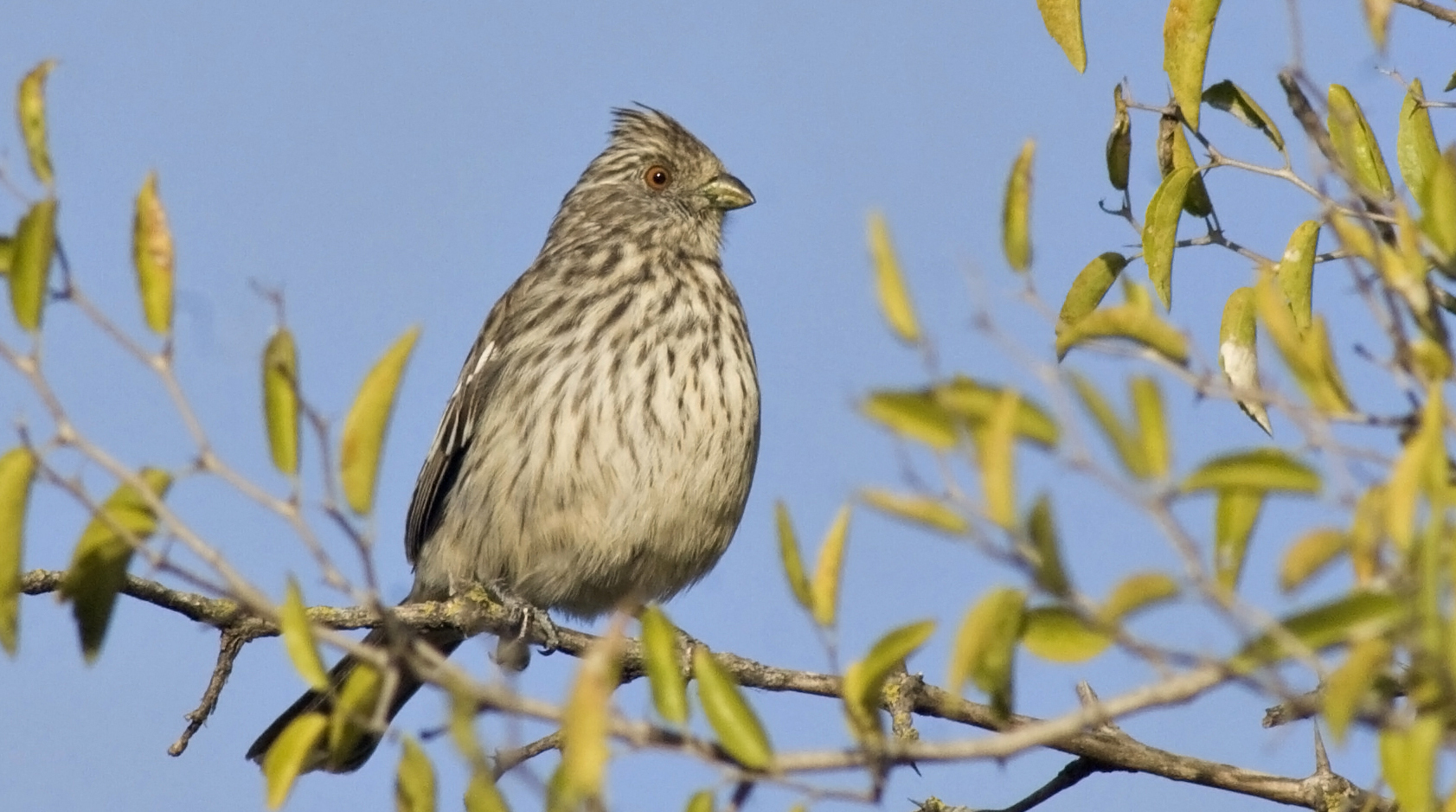
female bird

The white-tipped plantcutter is 18 to 19.5 cm (7.1 to 7.7 in) long and weighs 30 to 57 g (1.1 to 2.0 oz). The sexes have different plumage. Adult males of the nominate subspecies have a rufous forehead, a dark gray crown and cheeks, and a short crest. The gray has sparse darker streaks. Their upperparts are also dark gray with sparse darker streaks. Their wings are dusky blackish with white tips on the coverts that show as two wing bars. Their tail is dusky blackish with wide white tips on all but the central pair of feathers. Their chin, throat, and underparts are mostly rufous with gray-brown sides and flanks. Adult females have a mostly blackish brown head and upperparts. Their head has white streaks and their back has buffish gray streaks. Their wings are mostly blackish brown. The wing's coverts have thin white tips that form wing bars and their tertials have pale edges. Their tail is blackish brown with white edges on the outer webs of the outer feathers. Their throat and underparts are buffy to ochraceous with thick blackish brown streaks. Males of subspecies P. r. angustirostris have wider white tips on the tail and both sexes have a thicker bill than the nominate but are otherwise the same as it. Both sexes of both subspecies have a pale yellowish to hazel iris, a stout conical dark gray to blackish bill, and dark gray legs and feet. Their bill has small serrations on its cutting edges.

== Distribution and habitat ==
Subspecies P. r. angustirostris of the white-tipped plantcutter is the more northerly of the two. It is found in central and southern Bolivia and into northern Argentina's Salta Province. The nominate subspecies is found from Paraguay south into western Uruguay and northern and eastern Argentina as far as northeastern Chubut Province. The species has also occurred as a vagrant in Brazil and Chile. The species inhabits a variety of landscapes, most of which are fairly open. These include open woodlands, lowland and montane scrublands, thickets along waterways, parts of the Pampas, and gardens and orchards. East of the Andes it ranges in elevation from sea level to 1,800 m (5,900 ft) and in the Andes between 600 and 3,600 m (2,000 and 11,800 ft).

== Behavior ==
=== Movement ===
The white-tipped plantcutter is a partial migrant. Some individuals that breed in the southern regions move further north in Argentina and into Paraguay and southeastern Bolivia after the breeding season. Some remain south year-round as do the more northerly populations.

=== Feeding ===
The white-tipped plantcutter feeds on many parts of a wide variety of trees and shrubs. It feeds primarily on leaves but also includes small amounts of buds, flowers, shoots, and fruits in its diet. It usually forages in pairs or small groups though flocks of up to 100 individuals have been noted. It feeds mostly about 3 or 4 m (10 or 13 ft) above the ground but sometimes feeds on the ground.

=== Breeding ===
The white-tipped plantcutter's breeding season spans at least from September to February, and it is suspected of sometimes raising two broods per year. Its nest is a basket made from small branches lined with softer material, and is typically placed in a shrub or tree from near the ground to about 4 m (13 ft) above it. The clutch is two to four eggs and is incubated by the female alone. The incubation period is 14 to 15 days and fledging occurs about 17 days after hatch. Both parents provision and brood nestlings.

=== Vocalization ===
The white-tipped plantcutter's most common vocalization is "a mechanical errrrrrr, like sound made by winding old-fashioned alarm clock, sometimes repeated several times, and sometimes followed by lower and shorter errrr". It has also been likened to "a creaking door on unoiled, rusty hinges".

== Status ==
The IUCN has assessed the white-tipped plantcutter as being of Least Concern. It has a large range; its population size is not known and is believed to be decreasing. No immediate threats have been identified. It is considered fairly common and "even locally abundant seasonally". The nominate subspecies is found in several protected areas but P. r. angustirostris is known from only one.
