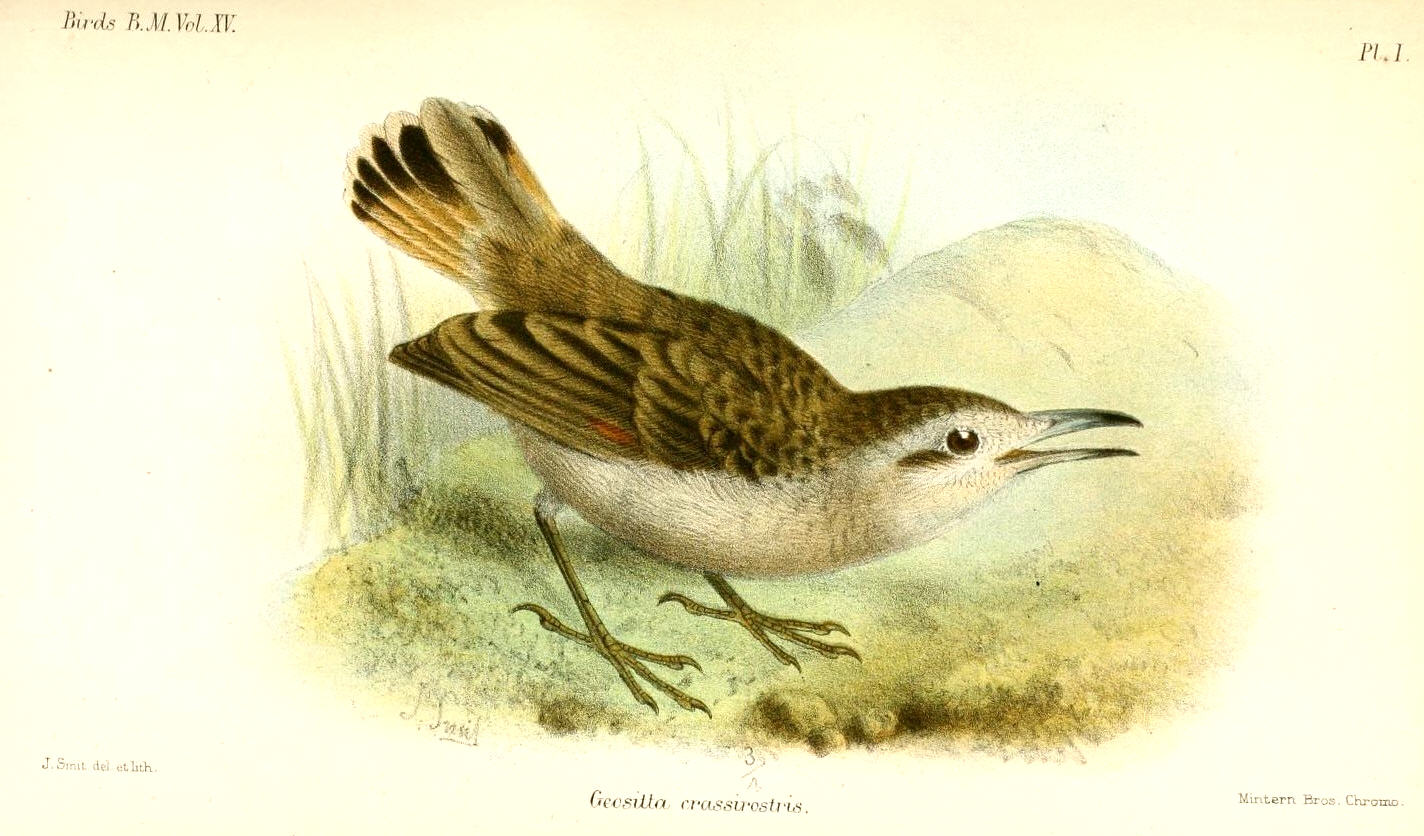

Conservation status
- Least Concern (IUCN 3.1)

Scientific classification
- Kingdom: Animalia
- Phylum: Chordata
- Class: Aves
- Order: Passeriformes
- Family: Furnariidae
- Genus: Geositta
- Species: G. crassirostris

Binomial name
- Geositta crassirostris Sclater, PL, 1866

= Thick-billed miner =

Species of bird

The thick-billed miner (Geositta crassirostris) is a species of bird in the subfamily Sclerurinae, the leaftossers and miners, of the ovenbird family Furnariidae. It is endemic to Peru.

== Taxonomy and systematics ==
The thick-billed miner's taxonomy is unsettled. The International Ornithological Committee and BirdLife International's Handbook of the Birds of the World assign it two subspecies, the nominate G. c. crassirostris (Sclater, PL, 1866) and G. c. fortis (Berlepsch & Stolzmann, 1901). The Clements taxonomy does not recognize fortis, treating the thick-billed miner as monotypic.

The thick-billed and campo miner (G. poeciloptera) are sister species.

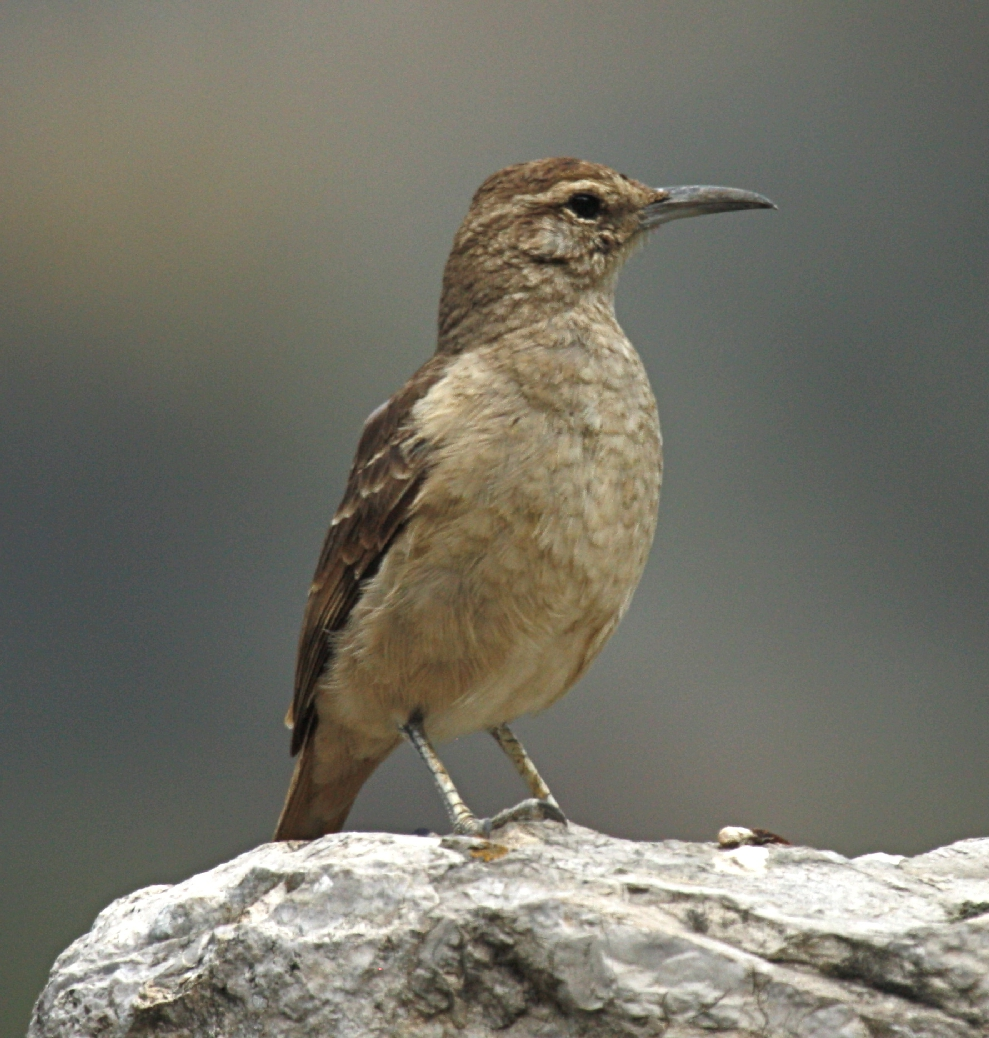
Thick-billed miner at Reserva Nacionale de LaChay - Peru

== Description ==
The puna miner is a large member of its genus. It is 18.5 to 19 cm (7.3 to 7.5 in) long and weighs 42 to 55 g (1.5 to 1.9 oz). The sexes are alike. The nominate subspecies has a pale face with a creamy supercilium. It is brown or gray-brown from its crown to its rump. Its central tail feathers are brown or dusky brown and the rest are mostly rufous with dusky brown tips. Its wing coverts are brown or gray-brown with whitish buff or paler brown tips. Its primaries are dusky with much rufous on the inner ones, its secondaries rufous with wide dusky bar near the end, and its tertials are dusky brown with pale gray-brown edges. Its chin is white or whitish and its breast and belly are pale grayish buff. Its iris is brown, its heavy decurved bill has a blackish gray to black maxilla and a blue-gray or blue-gray and black mandible, and its legs and feet are whitish to grayish. Subspecies G. c. fortis has more reddish upperparts than the nominate, with more rufous and less of a dusky bar on the flight feathers.

== Distribution and habitat ==
The exact extent of the thick-billed miner's range is not known. In general it is a bird of coastal hills and the west side of the Andes from central to southwestern Peru. The nominate subspecies is the more northerly of the two. It inhabits "arid boulder-strewn slopes, with scattered shrubs and columnar cacti." Near the coast it ranges in elevation between 300 and 800 m (1,000 and 2,600 ft) and in the Andes between 1,875 and 3,550 m (6,200 and 11,600 ft).

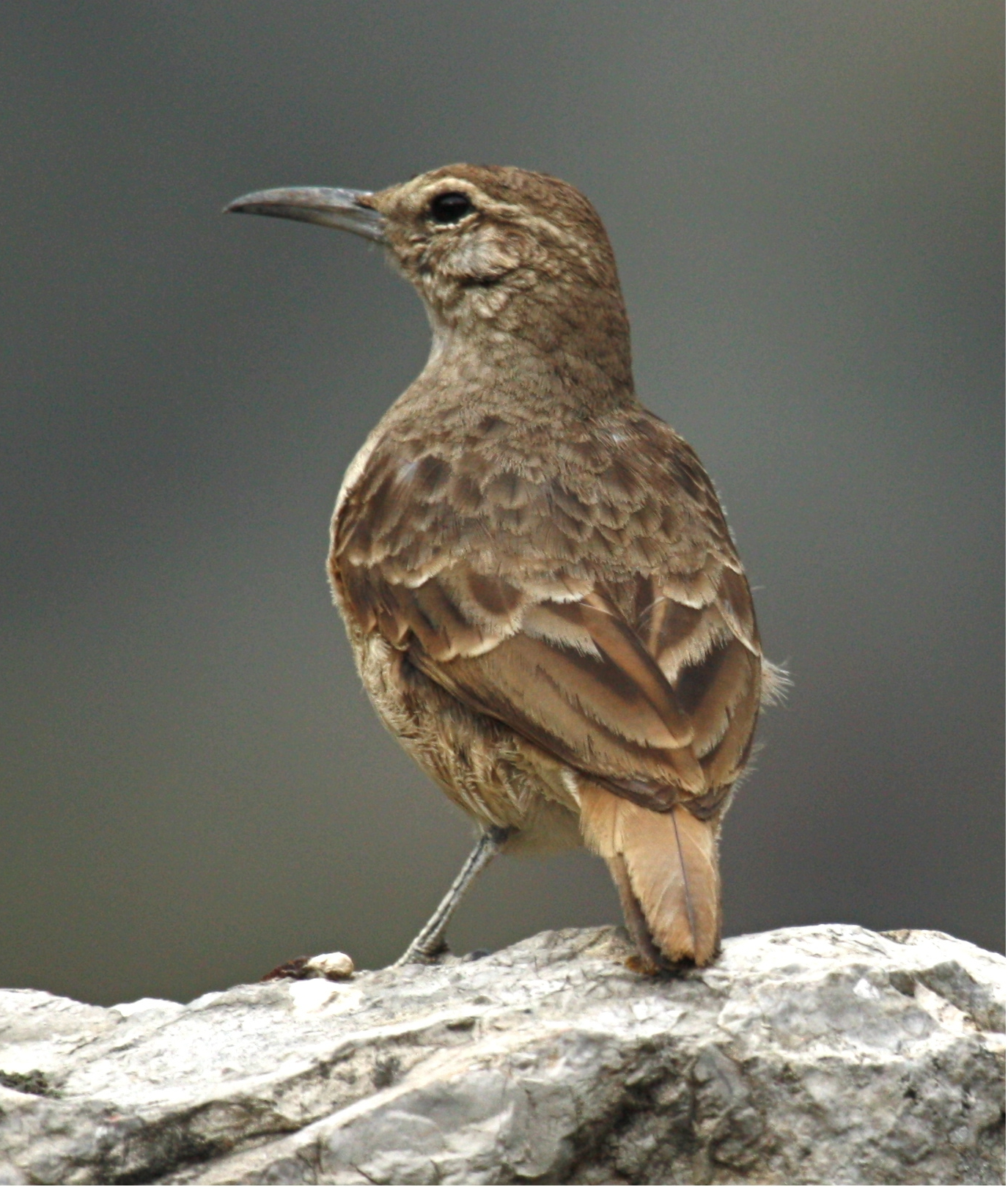
Thick-billed miner

== Behavior ==
=== Movement ===
The thick-billed miner appears to be a year-round resident.

=== Feeding ===
The thick-billed miner forages on the ground, singly or in pairs. It walks and runs between probing and picking for food. Its diet has not been described but the stomach contents of specimens have contained insect parts, vegetable matter, and grit.

=== Breeding ===
Nothing is known about the thick-billed miner's breeding biology. It is assumed to nest in a burrow in the ground like others of its genus.

=== Vocalization ===
The thick-billed miner's song is a "forceful, accelerating series of cueew notes often becoming a harsh, grating series of djeer-djeer-djeer-djeer ... notes". Its call is "a rising then falling mewing reew".

== Status ==
The IUCN has assessed the thick-billed miner as being of Least Concern. It has a large range but its population size is not known and is believed to be decreasing. No immediate threats have been identified. It is considered "uncommon to locally fairly common" and "probably is not greatly affected by human activity".
