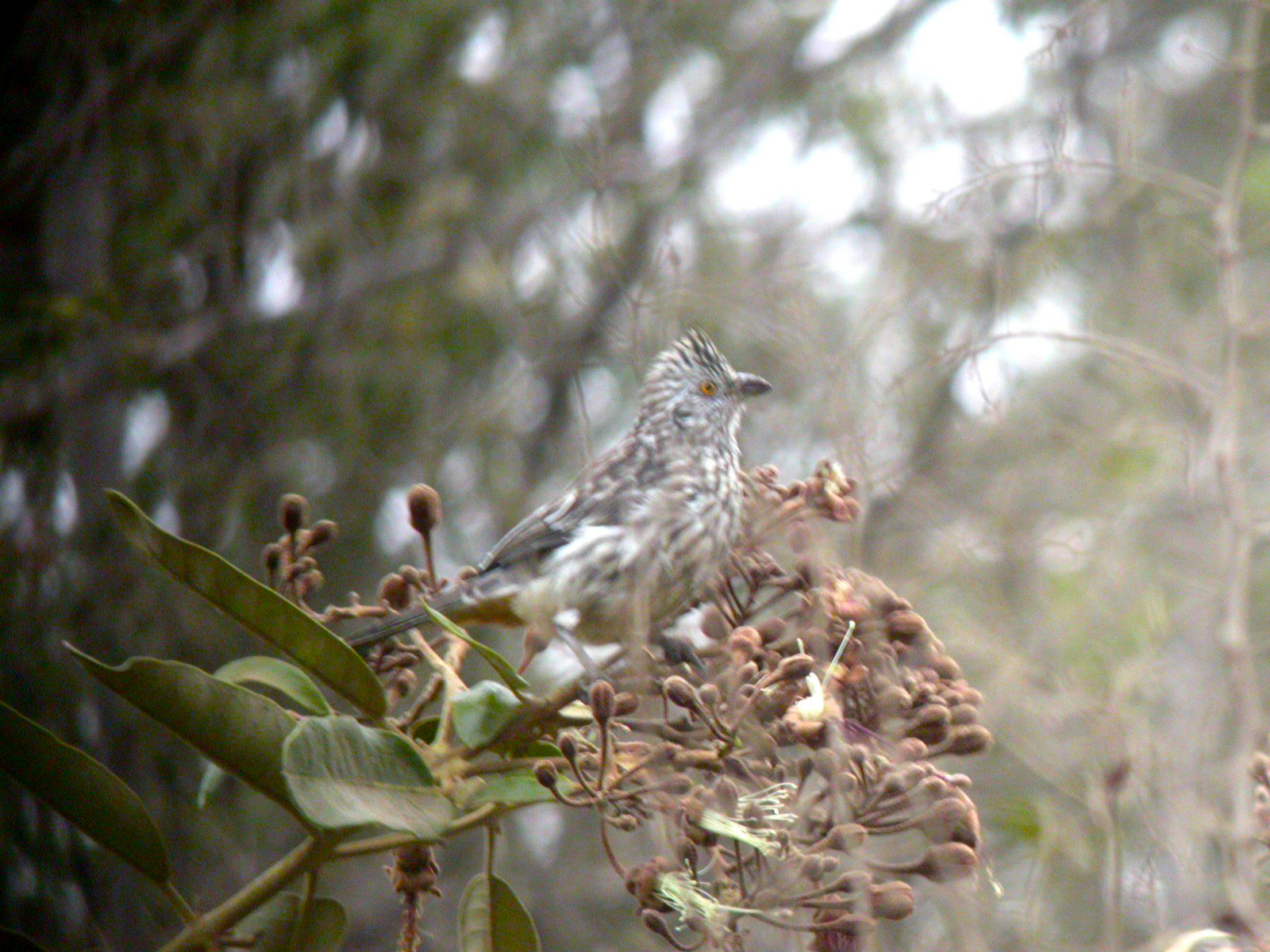
- Female

Conservation status
- Vulnerable (IUCN 3.1)

Scientific classification
- Kingdom: Animalia
- Phylum: Chordata
- Class: Aves
- Order: Passeriformes
- Family: Cotingidae
- Genus: Phytotoma
- Species: P. raimondii

Binomial name
- Phytotoma raimondii Taczanowski, 1883

= Peruvian plantcutter =

Species of bird

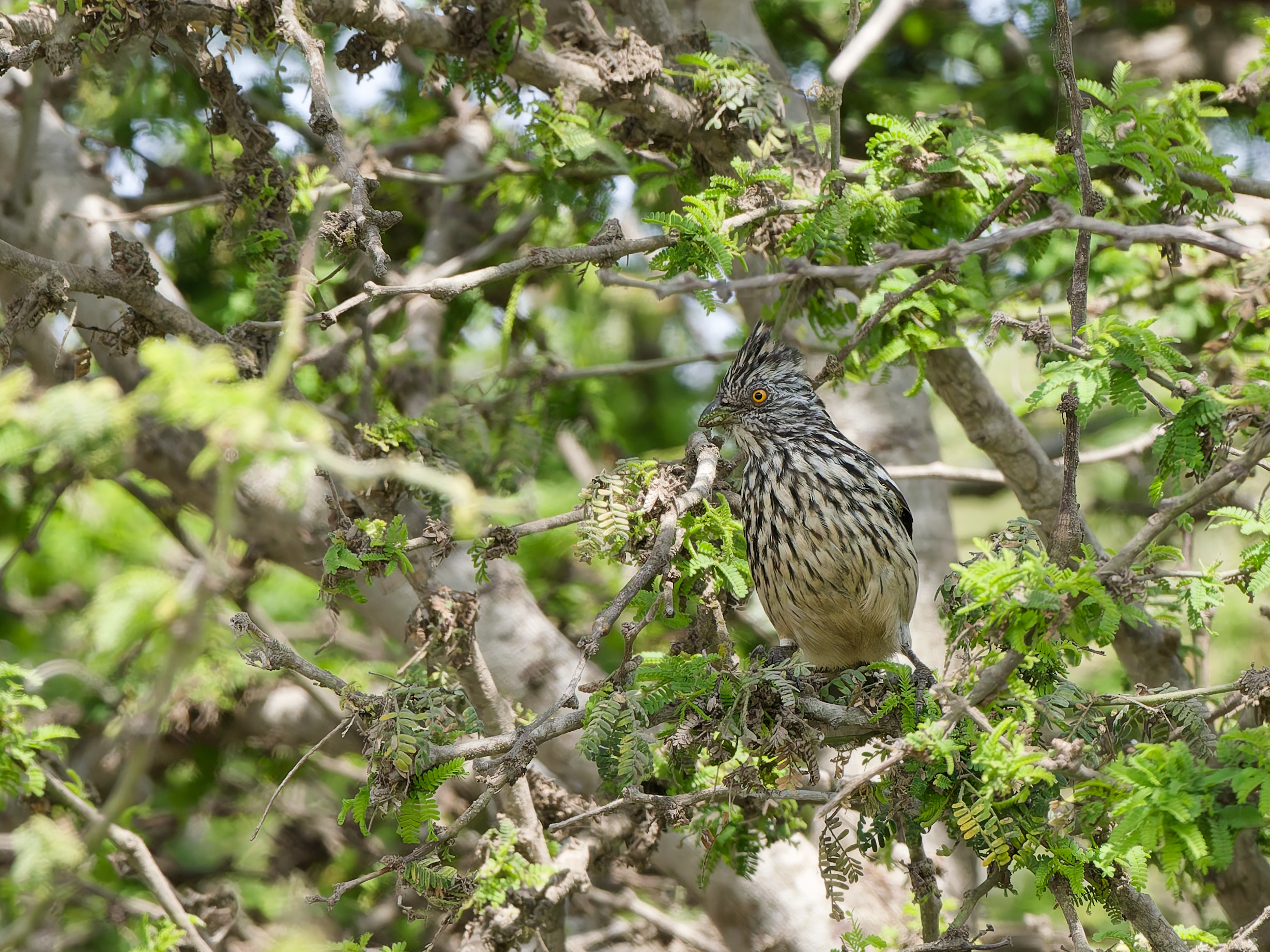
Peruvian plantcutter, female

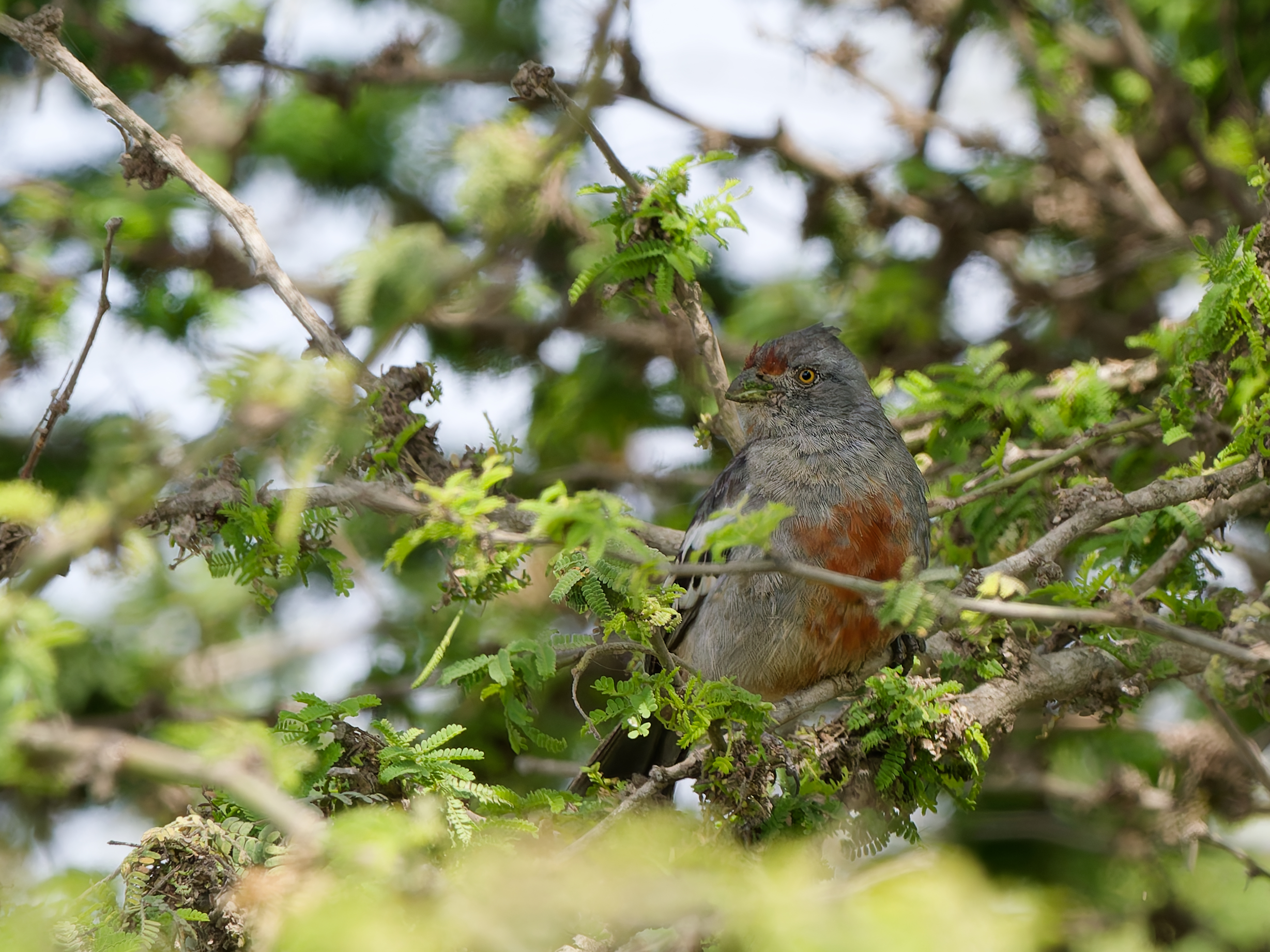
Peruvian plantcutter, male

The Peruvian plantcutter (Phytotoma raimondii) is an Vulnerable species of bird in the family Cotingidae, the cotingas. It is endemic to Peru.

== Taxonomy and systematics ==
For part of the twentieth century the genus Phytotoma was placed in its own family Phytotomidae but subsequent genetic testing proved that it belonged in its current Cotinga family. The Peruvian plantcutter shares genus Phytotoma with the white-tipped plantcutter (P. rutila) and rufous-tailed plantcutter (P. rara). It and the white-tipped are sister species.

The Peruvian plantcutter is monotypic.

== Description ==
The Peruvian plantcutter is 18 to 20 cm (7.1 to 7.9 in) long; four individuals weighed 37.2 to 46.6 g (1.3 to 1.6 oz). The sexes have different plumage. Adult males have a mostly bluish gray head with bright orange-rufous lores and a shaggy crest. Their upperparts are bluish gray, sometimes with some dusky streaks on the back. Their wings' lesser coverts are bluish gray, the median coverts black with large white tips that form a wide wing bar, and the greater coverts black with white edges and tips. The wing's tertials are black with white edges and the rest of the flight feathers blackish dusky. Their tail is dusky with wide white tips on all but the central pair of feathers. Their central underparts from the lower breast to the undertail coverts are bright orange-rufous. Adult females have a mostly whitish head and upperparts with heavy dusky streaks. Their rump is whitish with thinner streaks and their uppertail coverts grayish with white tips. Their wings' lesser coverts are like the back, the median coverts black with large white tips, and the greater coverts black with white edges and tips. The white on the coverts form two wing bars. The wing's tertials are black with white edges and the rest of the flight feathers dusky. Their tail is dusky with distinct white tips on the outer two pairs of feathers and diffuse white tips on the rest except the central pair. Their chin, throat, and underparts are whitish with dusky streaks with a buff or tawny tinge on the belly and a stronger buff or tawny wash on the undertail coverts. Both sexes have a bright yellow to amber iris, a stout decurved dark gray to blackish bill, and dark gray to blackish legs and feet. Their bill has a small "tooth" on the edge of the maxilla.

== Distribution and habitat ==
The Peruvian plantcutter is found in coastal northern Peru from Tumbes Department south to Ancash Department. Its distribution is very local along that band. It inhabits a variety of dry to arid landscapes including dry forest with a shrubby understory, desert scrublands, and thickets along watercourses through dry areas. It tends to favor slopes rather than flatlands. Some sources place its upper elevational limit at 300 m (1,000 ft) and others at 550 m (1,800 ft). A 2022 publication added sightings up to 1,550 m (5,100 ft).

== Behavior ==
=== Movement ===
The Peruvian plantcutter is a year-round resident but makes local movements within its range to follow food resources.

=== Feeding ===
The Peruvian plantcutter feeds on many parts of a wide variety of trees and shrubs including buds, flowers, shoots, and leaves. Fruits apparently are also a minor part of its diet. It usually forages in pairs or small groups and feeds mostly in the vegetation's canopy.

=== Breeding ===
Peruvian plantcutters form long-lasting pair bonds. Their breeding season spans the more humid part of the year between December and June. Both members of a pair construct the nest, a flimsy shallow cup of dry twigs lined with smaller twigs, hair, and feathers. They build it in the middle of tree or shrub's canopy; nests have been found between 1.2 to 6 m (4 to 20 ft) above the ground. The clutch is two to four eggs that are light blue with dark flecks. The female alone incubates, for 13 to 19 days. Fledging occurs 15 to 20 days after hatch. Both sexes brood and provision nestlings.

=== Vocalization ===
The Peruvian plantcutter's song is "a descending series of rising-falling, annoyed, nasal brays: REEEEH reeeh reeeh" and its calls "various annoyed nasal whines". It vocalizes throughout the day though more in the morning and late afternoon. It sings from the top of a bush or tree.

== Status ==
The IUCN originally in 1988 assessed the Peruvian plantcutter as Threatened, then in 1994 as Critically Endangered, in 2000 as Endangered, and since 2018 as Vulnerable. Though its range encompasses 88,000 km^{2} (34,000 sq mi) it occurs patchily in it and the area actually occupied is not known. Its estimated population of between 2200 and 10,000 mature individuals is believed to be decreasing. "The near-complete conversion of coastal river valleys to cultivation—especially large-scale sugar and rice plantations—has extirpated the species from numerous localities." Other threats include residential and commercial expansion, the introduction of non-native plant species such as Tamarix, and small scale ranching and agriculture. It is considered "very local [but] can be fairly common when present" in the limited areas with suitable habitat. It occurs in several protected areas and nearby outside them. "The planting of tree species that are favored by the Peruvian Plantcutter for feeding and nesting is a simple but effective conservation measure."
