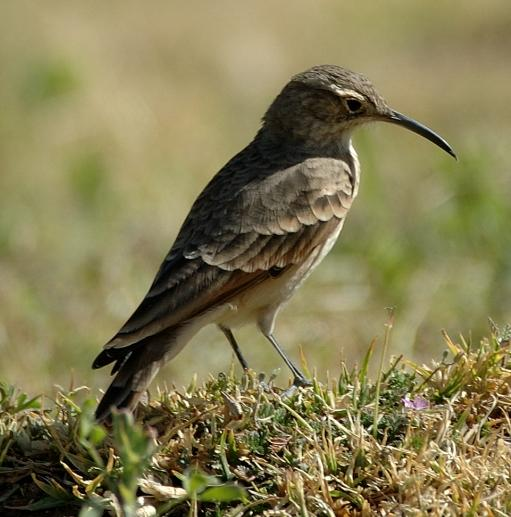
- Chiguata, Arequipa, Peru

Conservation status
- Least Concern (IUCN 3.1)

Scientific classification
- Kingdom: Animalia
- Phylum: Chordata
- Class: Aves
- Order: Passeriformes
- Family: Furnariidae
- Genus: Geositta
- Species: G. tenuirostris

Binomial name
- Geositta tenuirostris (Lafresnaye, 1836)

= Slender-billed miner =

Species of bird

The slender-billed miner (Geositta tenuirostris) is a species of bird in the subfamily Sclerurinae, the leaftossers and miners, of the ovenbird family Furnariidae. It is found in Argentina, Bolivia, Ecuador, and Peru.

== Taxonomy and systematics ==
The slender-billed miner has two subspecies, the nominate G. t. tenuirostris (Lafrenaye, 1836) and G. t. kalimayae (Krabbe, 1992).

Among the members of genus Geositta the coastal miner is most closely related to the common miner (G. cunicularia).

== Description ==
The slender-billed miner is a large member of its genus. It is 16 to 18 cm (6.3 to 7.1 in) long and weighs 32 to 38 g (1.1 to 1.3 oz). The sexes are alike. The nominate subspecies has a pale buffy brownish face with a whitish supercilium, a dark brownish stripe behind the eye, and a vague darker "moustache". It has a dull brown crown with wavy streaks, dull grayish brown upperparts, and slightly paler rump and uppertail coverts. Its central pair of tail feathers are dull brown with darker ends. The rest progress outward with less and less dark at the ends and more rufescent at their base to the outermost two pairs' rufous with some pale cinnamon. Dark brown wing coverts with dark buff tips form distinct wing bars. Its flight feathers are dark dusky with some rufous. Its throat is whitish, its breast buff-white with wavy brownish streaks, its belly pale buffy whitish, and its undertail coverts pale tawny. Its iris is dark brown, its long decurved bill is blackish with a pinkish base to the mandible, and its legs and feet black. Subspecies G. t. kalimayae is smaller and grayer than the nominate with darker wings and tail and more streaks on its breast.

== Distribution and habitat ==
The nominate subspecies of the slender-billed miner is by far the more widely distributed of the two. It is found on both slopes of the Andes of Peru almost from the border with Ecuador south through the Andes of Bolivia into northwestern Argentina as far as Tucumán Province. G. t. kalimayae is found disjunctly in central Ecuador's Cotopaxi Province. The species inhabits puna grass- and scrublands, pastures, and cultivated land; it is often found near water. In elevation it ranges between 2,500 and 4,600 m (8,200 and 15,100 ft).

== Behavior ==
=== Movement ===
The slender-billed miner is a year-round resident throughout its range.

=== Feeding ===
The slender-billed miner forages on the ground, gleaning, probing, and excavating for invertebrates. Its diet includes beetles, butterflies and moth larvae, spiders, and springtails.

=== Breeding ===
The slender-billed miner breeds during the austral summer. Males perform a display flight. The species nests in tunnels; one was thought to have been excavated in a bank by a Upucerthia earthcreeper. A nest of dried grass was in an elarged chamber at its end. The clutch size is two eggs.

=== Vocalization ===
The slender-billed miner's display flight song is "a repetitive series of 'jit' or 'keek' notes". Its calls have been described as "keeeeek", "week, week", "chwea" and a nasal "kyeenh".

== Status ==
The IUCN has assessed the slender-billed miner as being of Least Concern. It has a large range, and though its population size is not known it is believed to be stable. No immediate threats have been identified. It is considered fairly common throughout its range.
