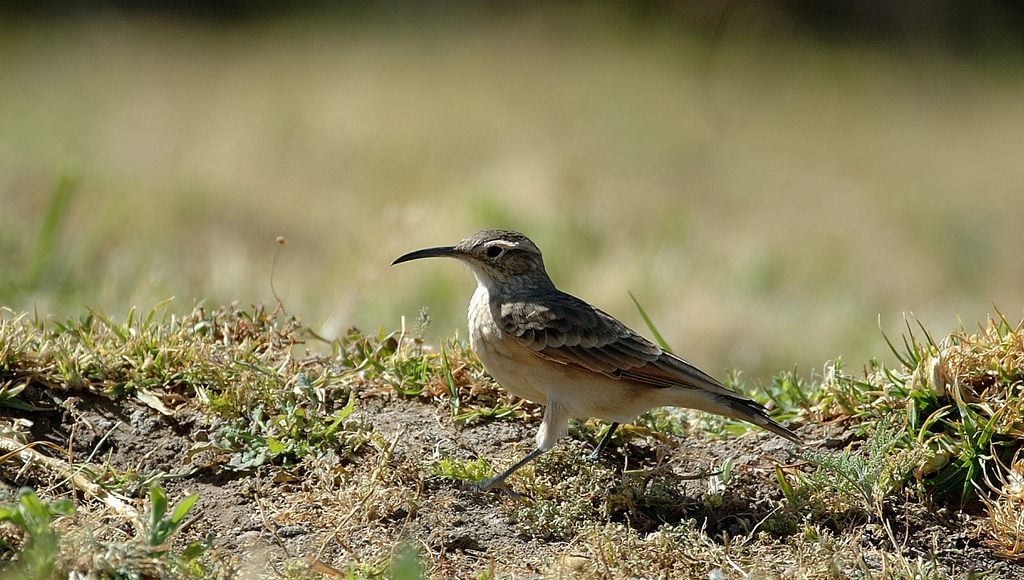
- Slender-billed miner (Geositta tenuirostris)

Scientific classification
- Kingdom: Animalia
- Phylum: Chordata
- Class: Aves
- Order: Passeriformes
- Family: Furnariidae
- Genus: Geositta; Swainson, 1837

Type species
- Geositta anthoides Swainson, 1838

Species
- 11, see text

= Geositta =

Genus of birds

Geositta is a genus of passerine birds in the ovenbird family, Furnariidae. They are known as miners (not to be confused with the unrelated miners, Manorina, of Australia) due to the tunnels they dig for nesting. There are 11 species including the campo miner (Geositta poeciloptera) which was formerly classified in a genus of its own, Geobates. They inhabit open country in South America, particularly the Andean and Patagonian regions. They are ground-dwelling birds, somewhat resembling the larks and wheatears of other continents. They are mostly drab brown in coloration and often have a fairly long and slender bill.

== Taxonomy ==
The genus Geositta was introduced in 1837 by the English naturalist William Swainson to accommodate a single species, Geositta anthoides which is therefore the type species by monotypy. Swainson formally described the type species in the following year in his Animals in Menageries. The name Geositta anthoides is considered as a junior synonym of Alauda fissirostris which had been described in 1835 by the German naturalist Heinrich von Kittlitz. The taxon is now treated as a subspecies of the common miner with the trinomial name Geositta cunicularia fissirostris. The genus name Geositta combines the Ancient Greek γεω-/geō- meaning "ground-" or "earth-" with the genus Sitta that had been introduced for the Eurasian nuthatch in 1758 by Carl Linnaeus.

The following cladogram showing the relationship between the species is based on a large molecular phylogenetic study of the suboscines by Michael Harvey and collaborators that was published in 2020.

- Geositta
  - - Coastal miner – Geositta peruviana
    - - Slender-billed miner – Geositta tenuirostris
      - - Common miner – Geositta cunicularia
        - Puna miner – Geositta punensis
  - - - Campo miner – Geositta poeciloptera
      - - Thick-billed miner – Geositta crassirostris
        - Rufous-banded miner – Geositta rufipennis
    - - Greyish miner – Geositta maritima
      - - Dark-winged miner – Geositta saxicolina
        - - Short-billed miner – Geositta antarctica
          - Creamy-rumped miner – Geositta isabellina

== Species list ==
The genus contains 11 species:

Image	Scientific name	Common name	Distribution
	Geositta peruviana	Coastal miner	Peru
	Geositta cunicularia	Common miner	Puna grassland, coastal Peru and Chile; Argentina, Bolivia, Uruguay and South Region (Brazil)
	Geositta tenuirostris	Slender-billed miner	Argentina, Bolivia, Chile, Ecuador, and Peru
	Geositta antarctica	Short-billed miner	Santa Cruz Province and Tierra del Fuego
	Geositta isabellina	Creamy-rumped miner	Argentina and Chile
	Geositta saxicolina	Dark-winged miner	Peru
	Geositta maritima	Greyish miner	Chile and Peru
	Geositta punensis	Puna miner	Argentina, Bolivia, Chile, and Peru
	Geositta rufipennis	Rufous-banded miner	Argentina, Bolivia, and Chile
	Geositta poeciloptera	Campo miner	Brazil and far northeastern Bolivia
	Geositta crassirostris	Thick-billed miner	Peru
