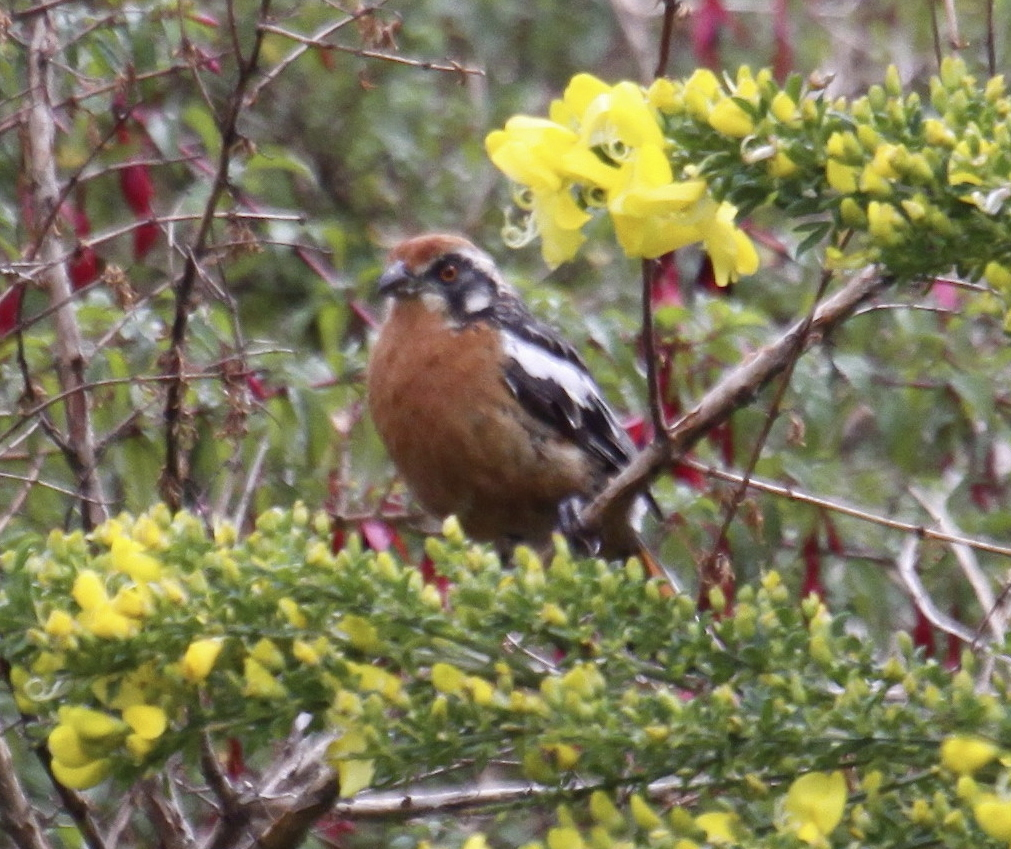
- Rufous-tailed plantcutter (Phytotoma rara)

Scientific classification
- Kingdom: Animalia
- Phylum: Chordata
- Class: Aves
- Order: Passeriformes
- Family: Cotingidae
- Genus: Phytotoma; Molina, 1782

Type species
- Phytotoma rara Molina, 1782

Species
- see text

= Plantcutter =

Plantcutters

Genus of birds

The plantcutters are a group of passerine birds in the cotinga family, Cotingidae. They were previously in their own family, Phytotomidae. The three plantcutters are all placed in the genus Phytotoma.

These are robust birds of open woodland, scrub and farmland in southern and western South America. They resemble finches, and are among the few primarily folivorous birds, though they also take some fruits, berries and flowers. The common name is a reference to their stubby bills with fine serrations along the cutting edge – an adaptation for cutting plant material.

They are sexually dichromatic, with males having black wings with white patches, and at least partially rufous underparts. The plumage of the females is greyish-white or brownish-white with dense dark streaking throughout.

These pair-living birds lay 2 - 4 brown-spotted green eggs in a tree nest. Only the female incubates, but both sexes participate in the nest-building and feeding of the chicks. The chicks are fed almost exclusively with insects.

== Species ==
Image	Scientific name	Common name	Distribution
	Phytotoma rutila	White-tipped plantcutter or reddish plantcutter	lowlands east of the Andes
	Phytotoma rara	Rufous-tailed plantcutter or Chilean plantcutter	Chile and western Argentina
	Phytotoma raimondii	Peruvian plantcutter	north-western Peru
