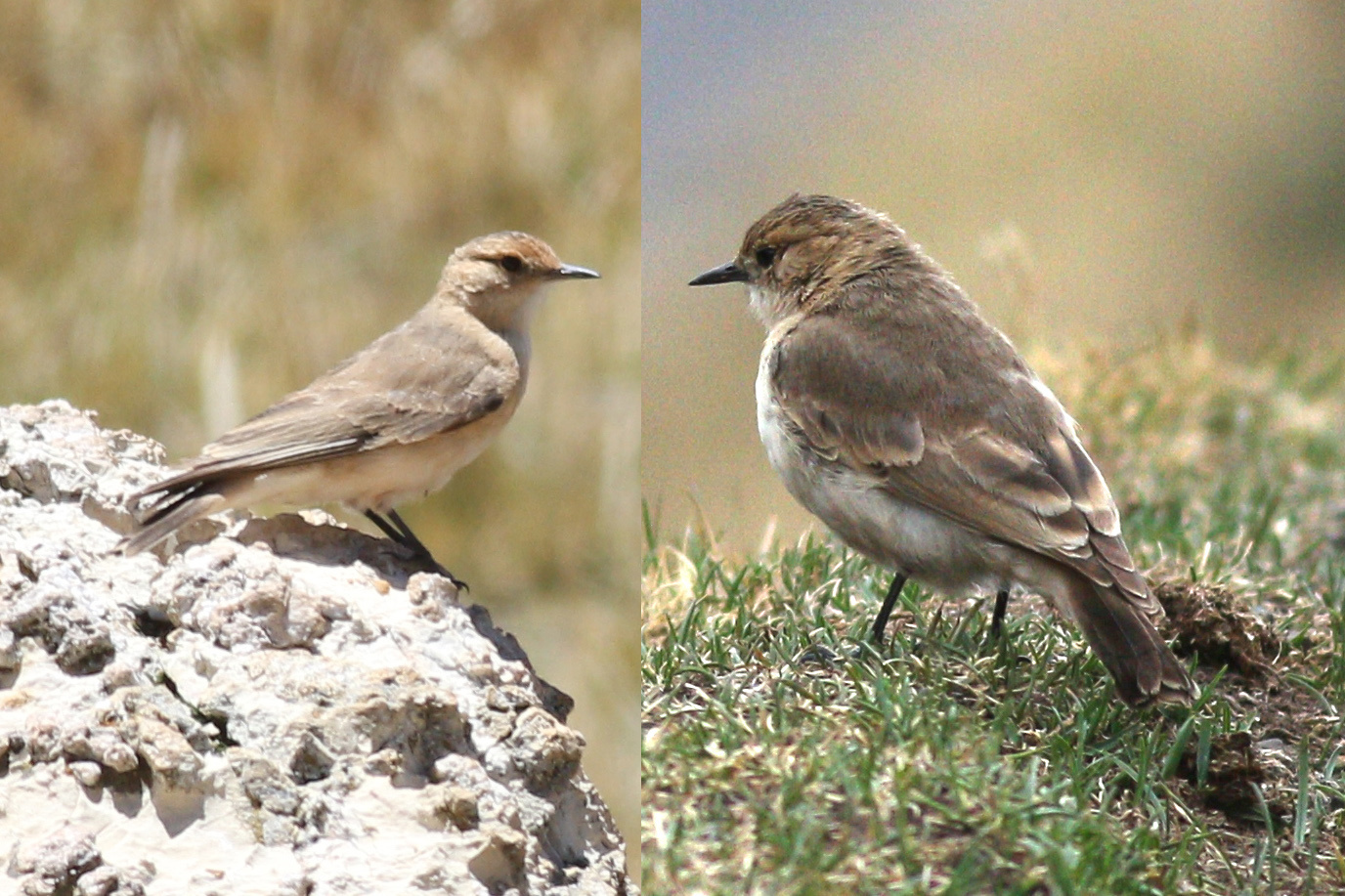

Conservation status
- Least Concern (IUCN 3.1)

Scientific classification
- Kingdom: Animalia
- Phylum: Chordata
- Class: Aves
- Order: Passeriformes
- Family: Furnariidae
- Genus: Geositta
- Species: G. saxicolina

Binomial name
- Geositta saxicolina Taczanowski, 1875

= Dark-winged miner =

Species of bird

The dark-winged miner (Geositta saxicolina) is a species of bird in the subfamily Sclerurinae, the leaftossers and miners, of the ovenbird family Furnariidae. It is endemic to Peru.

== Taxonomy and systematics ==
The dark-winged miner is monotypic.

== Description ==
The dark-winged miner is a medium size member of its genus. It is 15 to 16.5 cm (5.9 to 6.5 in) long and weighs about 31 g (1.1 oz). The sexes are alike. Adults have a cinnamon buff forehead and face with a pinkish buff supercilium. Their crown and back are medium brown and their rump and uppertail coverts bright pale buff. Their tail's innermost pair of feathers are black with a small length of creamy buff at their bases; the rest have progressively more creamy buff. The outermost pair has whitish buff outer webs and pale cinnamon buff inner webs with a dusky band near the end. Their wing coverts are brown with wide paler edges and their flight feathers dusky brown. Their underparts are buff or pinkish buff that is brighter on the sides of the breast. Their iris is brown, their short bill is black with a gray base to the mandible, and their legs and feet are black. Juveniles have a warm buffy tinge overall and dusky scaling on the breast.

== Distribution and habitat ==
The dark-winged miner is found only in the Andes of central Peru, between the departments of Pasco and Huancavelica. It inhabits the Altiplano, where it favors gently sloping grasslands with a rocky substrate. In elevation it ranges from 3,700 to 4,900 m (12,100 to 16,100 ft).

== Behavior ==
=== Movement ===
The dark-winged miner is a year-round resident throughout its range.

=== Feeding ===
The dark-winged miner forages on the ground, singly, in pairs, and possibly in small family groups. Its diet has not been described but is known to include insects; it is assumed to also eat other arthropods and seeds.

=== Breeding ===
Almost nothing is known about the dark-winged miner's breeding biology. Its nesting season includes December but is otherwise unknown. It is assumed to nest in a chamber at the end of a burrow in the ground like others of its genus.

=== Vocalization ===
The dark-winged miner's vocalizations are imperfectly known. One whose purpose is unknown is "a pretty, melodic cheecheechee-chi-chi-chi-chi". Its calls include "chips and very short raspy notes" and in flight it gives a "tirr tirr tirr".

== Status ==
The IUCN has assessed the dark-winged miner as being of Least Concern. It has a restricted range, and though its population size is not known it is believed to be stable. No immediate threats have been identified. It is considered to be fairly common to common. "Human activity probably has little direct effect on [the] Dark-winged Miner".
