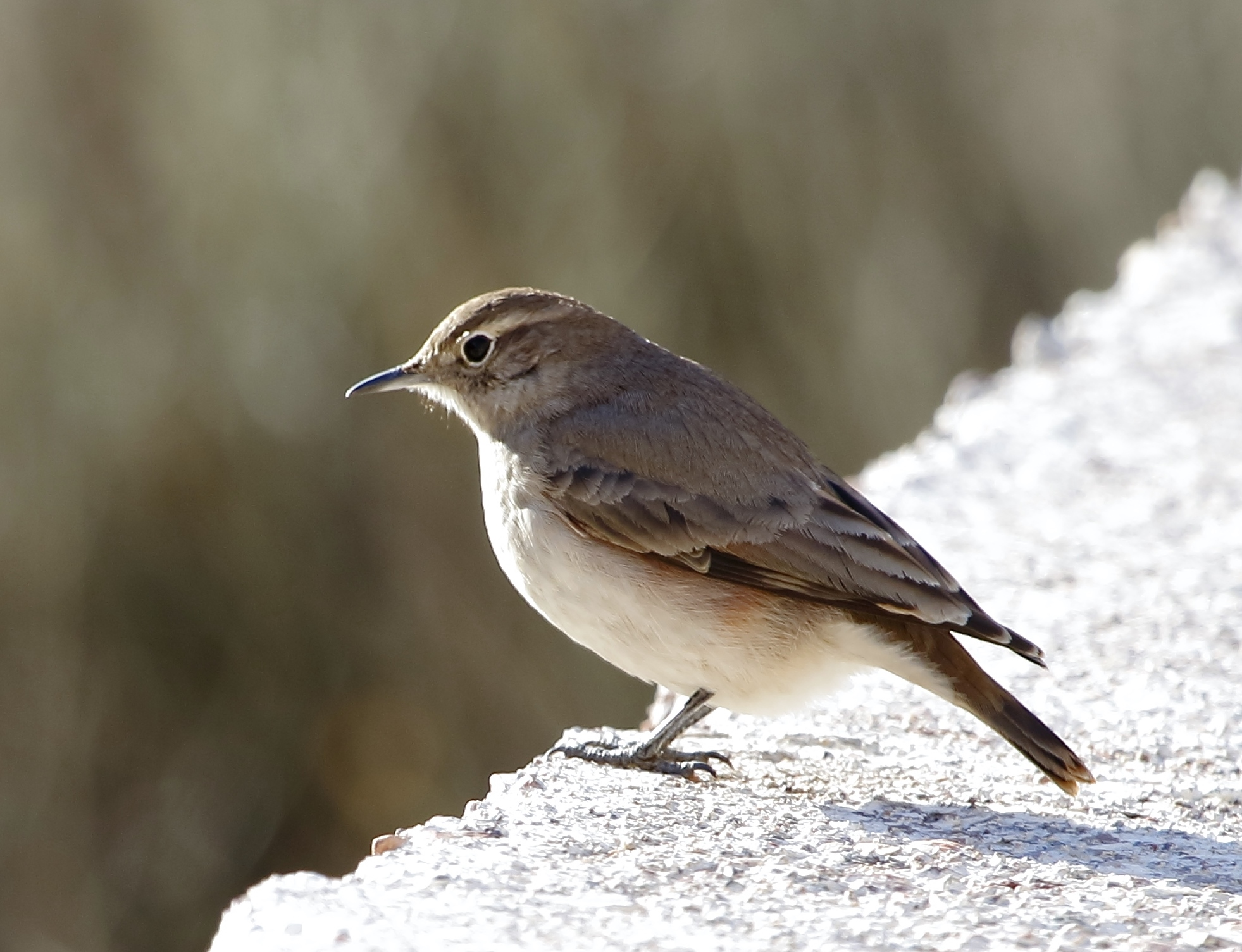
- In the Andes of Mendoza, Argentina

Conservation status
- Least Concern (IUCN 3.1)

Scientific classification
- Kingdom: Animalia
- Phylum: Chordata
- Class: Aves
- Order: Passeriformes
- Family: Furnariidae
- Genus: Geositta
- Species: G. rufipennis

Binomial name
- Geositta rufipennis (Burmeister, 1860)

= Rufous-banded miner =

Species of bird

The rufous-banded miner (Geositta rufipennis) is a species of bird in the subfamily Sclerurinae, the leaftossers and miners, of the ovenbird family Furnariidae. It is found in Argentina, Bolivia, and Chile.

== Taxonomy and systematics ==
The rufous-banded miner's taxonomy is unsettled. The International Ornithological Committee (IOC) assigns it these six subspecies:

- G. r. fasciata (Philippi & Landbeck, 1864)
- G. r. harrisoni Marin, Kiff & Peña, 1989
- G. r. rufipennis (Burmeister, 1860)
- G. r. giaii Contreras, 1976
- G. r. ottowi Hoy, G, 1968
- G. r. hoyi Contreras, 1980

The Clements taxonomy and BirdLife International's Handbook of the Birds of the World add a seventh, G. r. fragai (Nores, 1986), which the IOC includes in G. r. hoyi.

Some authors suggest that the rufous-banded miner should be split into more than one species.

This article follows the six-subspecies model.

== Description ==
The rufous-banded miner is a medium to large member of its genus. It is 14 to 17 cm (5.5 to 6.7 in) long and weighs 25 to 54 g (0.88 to 1.9 oz). The sexes are alike. The nominate subspecies G. r. rufipennis has a brownish gray face with a pale supercilium and a dark gray-brown line behind the eye. It is dull sandy olive from its crown to its uppertail coverts. Its central tail feathers have dull tawny bases, grayish brown middles, a wide blackish band near the end, and dull tawny tips. The rest have progressively redder bases and smaller black bands to the outermost. Its wing is dull gray brown with paler edges to the feathers. Its flight feathers have rufescent bases that form a wide band. Its throat is whitish, its breast pale brownish buff, its belly and flanks paler with a cinnamon tinge, and its undertail coverts dull pale tawny. Its iris is brown, its straight medium-length bill is blackish gray with a pale horn base to the mandible, and its legs and feet are blue-gray.

The other subspecies differ in both their size and colors. G. r. ottowi is larger and grayer than the nominate, with narrower wing bars and a paler underside to the wings. G. r. hoyi has almost entirely gray upperparts; its underparts are mostly pinkish gray with the breast being less pinkish. G. r. giaii is similar to hoyi but is a slightly darker gray above, has narrower wing bands, and a significantly longer bill. G. r. fasciata has grayer upperparts and is darker overall than the other subspecies. G. r. harrisoni is the smallest subspecies; compared to fasciata it has a whiter belly and little or no rufous on its flanks and undertail coverts.

== Distribution and habitat ==
The subspecies of the rufous-banded miner are distributed thus:

- G. r. fasciata, western Bolivia and the Pacific slope of Chile between the Atacama Region and Malleco Province
- G. r. harrisoni, southwestern Antofagasta Region of northern Chile
- G. r. rufipennis, northwestern Argentina between Jujuy and San Juan provinces
- G. r. giaii, southwestern Argentina between Neuquén and Chubut provinces, and possibly further south in Argentina and in far southern Chile
- G. r. ottowi, Sierras de Córdoba in west central Argentina
- G. r. hoyi, western Argentina between La Rioja and Neuquén provinces and in southern Chile's Aysén Region

The rufous-banded miner inhabits several open landscapes: puna grassland, arid montane scrublands, dry rocky slopes, flat areas with scattered vegetation, and also dry riverbeds. In elevation it is found between 3,100 and 4,400 m (10,200 and 14,400 ft) in the Andes. East of them in central Argentina it occurs as low as 2,200 m (7,200 ft) and reaches almost down to sea level in Chile's Atacama Province.

== Behavior ==
=== Movement ===
Most populations of the rufous-banded miner are mostly year-round residents but in Argentina and Chile some subpopulations move downslope after the breeding season. The southernmost populations move north after breeding but the division between them and the more northerly resident subpopulations is unclear. Migrant flocks may contain 500 individuals.

=== Feeding ===
The rufous-banded miner gleans its food on the ground, singly or in pairs. Its diet is mostly arthropods and also includes seeds and leaf buds.

=== Breeding ===
The rufous-banded miner breeds during the austral summer with some latitudinal variation. It is assumed to be monogamous. It usually excavates a horizontal tunnel with an enlarged chamber at the end in an earthen bank or slope, though sometime it nests in a rock crevice. It pads the nest chamber with grass, hair, feathers, and other soft material. The clutch size is two or three eggs.

=== Vocalization ===
The rufous-banded miner's song is "a fast series...of buzzy, trilled notes on the same pitch" that may include "bursts of faster notes". It is sung from a perch on a rock and during display flight.

== Status ==
The IUCN has assessed the rufous-banded miner as being of Least Concern. It has a large range but its population size is not known and is believed to be decreasing. No immediate threats have been identified. It is considered fairly common throughout its range, and is "reasonably safe from anthropogenic disturbance, except overgrazing".
