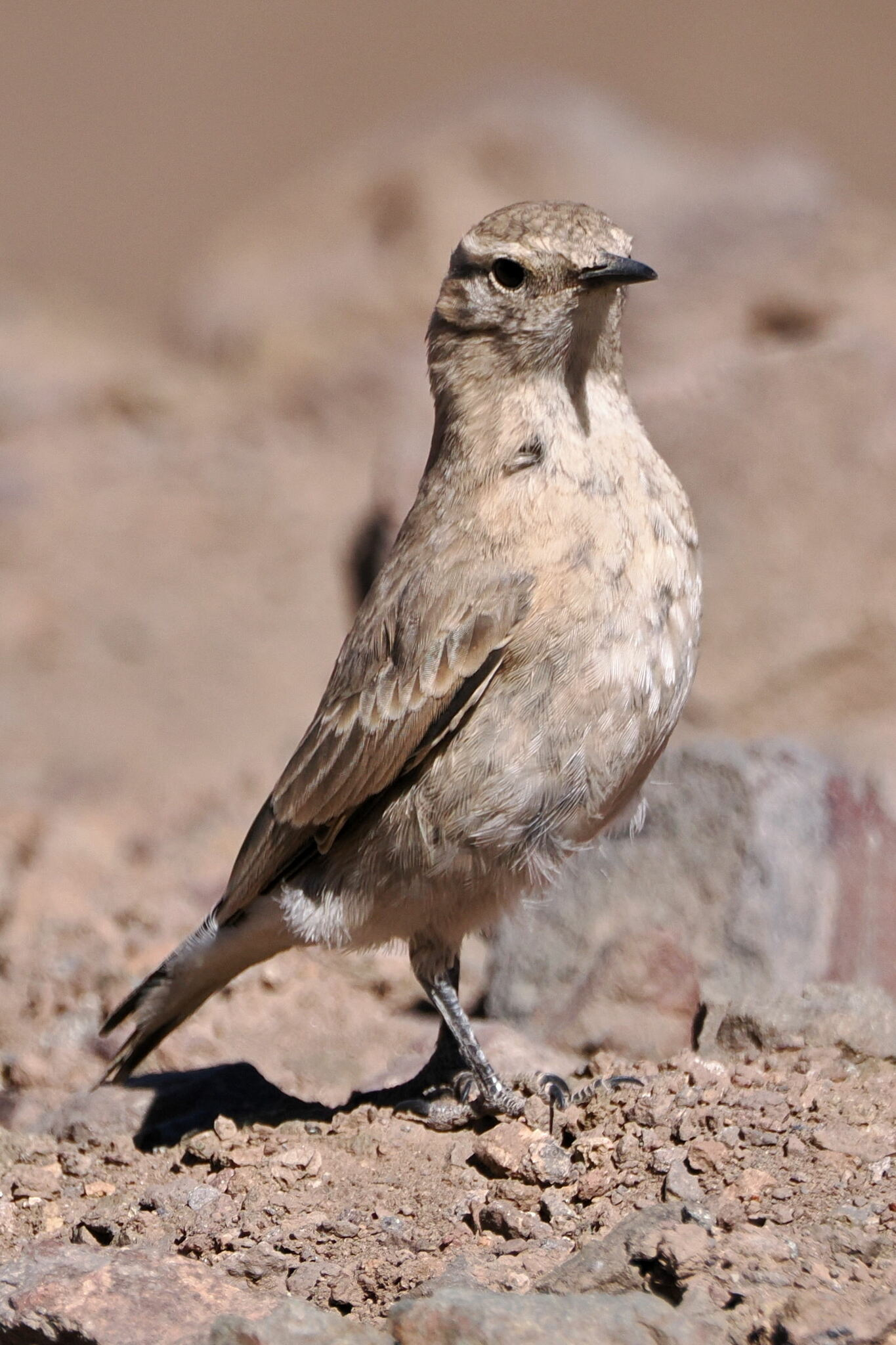

Conservation status
- Least Concern (IUCN 3.1)

Scientific classification
- Kingdom: Animalia
- Phylum: Chordata
- Class: Aves
- Order: Passeriformes
- Family: Furnariidae
- Genus: Geositta
- Species: G. isabellina

Binomial name
- Geositta isabellina (Philippi & Landbeck, 1864)

= Creamy-rumped miner =

Species of bird

The creamy-rumped miner (Geositta isabellina) is a species of bird in the subfamily Sclerurinae, the leaftossers and miners, of the ovenbird family Furnariidae. It is found in Argentina and Chile.

== Taxonomy and systematics ==
The creamy-rumped miner is monotypic.

== Description ==
The creamy-rumped miner is a medium-large member of its genus. It is 17.5 to 18.5 cm (6.9 to 7.3 in) long and weighs 38 to 48 g (1.3 to 1.7 oz). The sexes are alike. Adults have a pale sandy buff face with a paler supercilium. Their crown and back are pale sandy buff and their rump and uppertail coverts are creamy white. Their tail's innermost pair of feathers are blackish; the rest are buff with a wide blackish band near the end. Their wings are sandy buff. Their throat is whitish and the rest of their underparts are light ochraceous cream to grayish cream. Their iris is brown, their fairly long decurved bill is blackish with a yellowish horn base to the mandible, and their legs and feet are blue-gray. Juveniles are like adults with the addition of pale spots on the crown.

== Distribution and habitat ==
The creamy-rumped miner is found in the Chilean Andes between the Atacama Region and Talca Province and in adjoining Catamarca, San Juan, and Mendoza provinces in Argentina. It inhabits the high Andes, where it favors puna grasslands on generally barren slopes with rocky outcroppings. In elevation it mostly ranges from 3,000 to 5,000 m (9,800 to 16,400 ft) though it also occurs down to 2,000 m (6,600 ft).

== Behavior ==
=== Movement ===
The creamy-rumped miner is generally resident but some individuals move to lower elevations after breeding. Some individuals also move north into Chile's Antofagasta Region.

=== Feeding ===
The creamy-rumped miner forages on the ground, singly or in pairs. Its gleans its diet of arthropods from the ground and rocks.

=== Breeding ===
The creamy-rumped miner is assumed to nest during the austral summer; young have been observed in February and March. It is assumed to be monogamous. It excavates a tunnel with an enlarged chamber at its end in sloping ground. The clutch size is three eggs.

=== Vocalization ===
The creamy-rumped miner's song is a "loud, strident trill of 3–12 notes" that is given in display flight or from a rock perch.

== Status ==
The IUCN has assessed the creamy-rumped miner as being of Least Concern. It has a restricted range and its population size is not known and is believed to be decreasing. No immediate threats have been identified. It is considered uncommon. Its "[h]abitat is reasonably safe from anthropogenic disturbances, except overgrazing."
