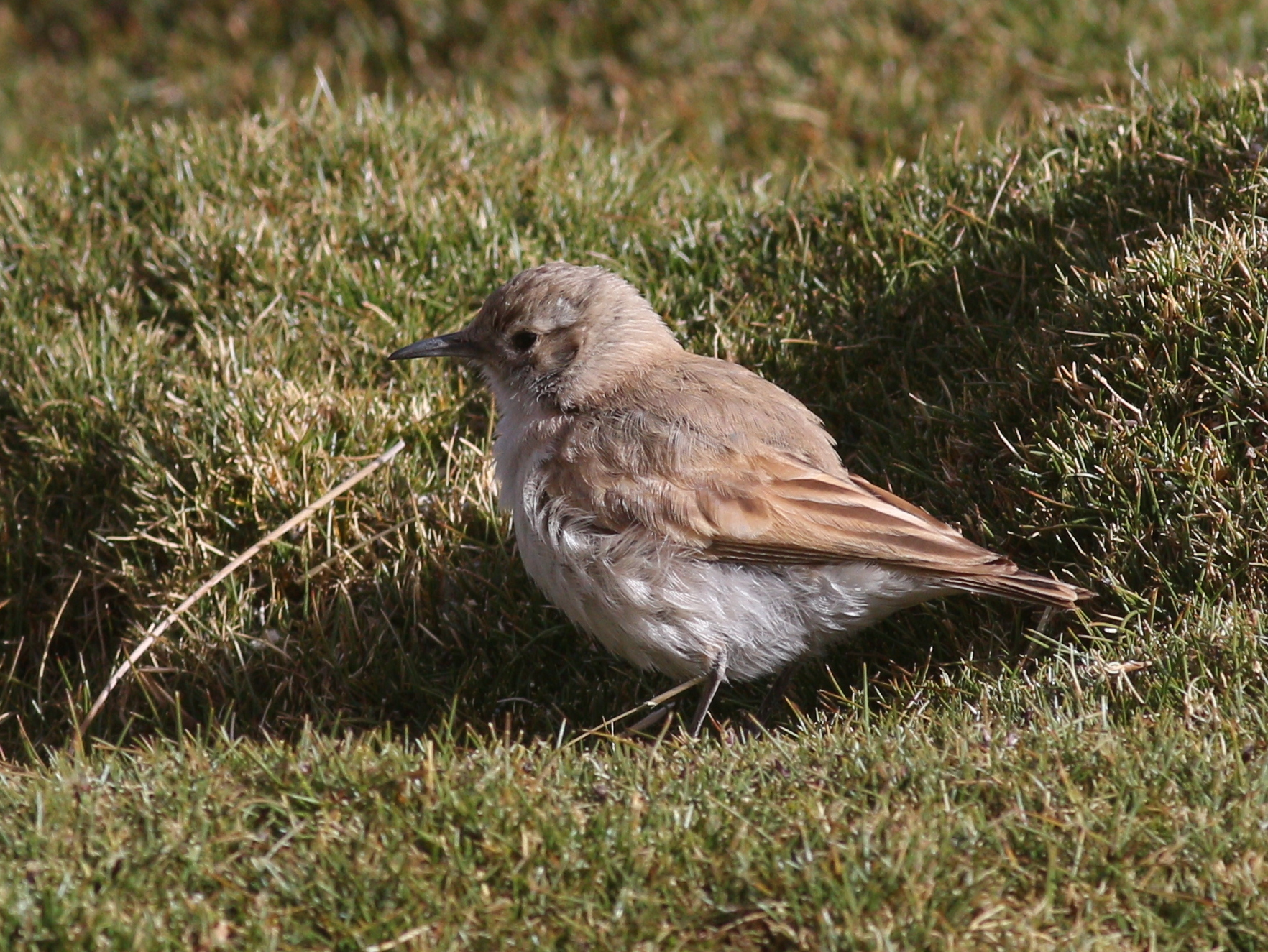

Conservation status
- Least Concern (IUCN 3.1)

Scientific classification
- Kingdom: Animalia
- Phylum: Chordata
- Class: Aves
- Order: Passeriformes
- Family: Furnariidae
- Genus: Geositta
- Species: G. punensis

Binomial name
- Geositta punensis Dabbene, 1917

= Puna miner =

Species of bird

The puna miner (Geositta punensis) is a passerine bird in the subfamily Sclerurinae, the leaftossers and miners, of the ovenbird family Furnariidae. It is found in Argentina, Bolivia, Chile, and Peru.

== Taxonomy and systematics ==
The puna miner is monotypic.

== Description ==
The puna miner is a medium-size member of its genus. It is 13.5 to 14 cm (5.3 to 5.5 in) long and weighs 22 to 29 g (0.78 to 1.0 oz). The sexes are alike. It has a pale grayish brown face with a buffy whitish supercilium. It is pale sandy brown from its crown to its rump; its uppertail coverts are even paler. Its tail feathers have pale tawny rufous bases, dark brownish to blackish middles, and pale tawny rufous tips. The pale basal area is progressively larger from the innermost to the outer feathers and the outermost have almost entirely white outer webs. Its wing coverts and flight feathers are dark brownish with whitish buff tips; the flight feathers also have pale tawny rufous bases that show as a band in flight. Its throat, breast, and belly are pale buff-white with a pale tawny tinge on the flanks. Its iris is brown, its medium-length bill is blackish with a blue-gray base to the mandible, and its legs and feet are dark gray.

== Distribution and habitat ==
The puna miner is a bird of the Altiplano, a high elevation plateau in the Andes of far southern Peru, western Bolivia, northeastern Chile, and northwestern Argentina. There it inhabits puna grasslands and barren areas; it sometimes occurs on open slopes above brushy ravines. In elevation it mostly ranges between 3,200 and 4,600 m (10,500 and 15,100 ft) but is found as low as 3,050 m (10,000 ft) and as high as 5,000 m (16,400 ft).

== Behavior ==
=== Movement ===
The puna miner is a year-round resident throughout its range.

=== Feeding ===
The puna miner forages singly or in pairs. It gleans food from the ground and small shrubs while hopping, not walking. Its diet is mostly arthropods and seeds.

=== Breeding ===
The puna miner breeds in the austral summer, generally between October and January. It is thought to be monogamous. It nests in a burrow, usually one made in dry sandy soil by a tuco-tuco (Ctenomys), a small rodent. The clutch size is two or three eggs.

=== Vocalization ===
The puna miner often sings during a display flight, "a long shrill series of 'veoo' notes, rising early and then descending". The song has some "faster, chattier notes" mixed in. Its flight call is "a sharp, rich 'pzea' or 'kvee'."

== Status ==
The IUCN has assessed the puna miner as being of Least Concern. It has a large range, and though its population size is not known it is believed to be stable. No immediate threats have been identified. It is considered uncommon to locally fairly common. It "[c]o-exists with humans on heavily grazed Altiplano, and presumably has done so for thousands of years."
