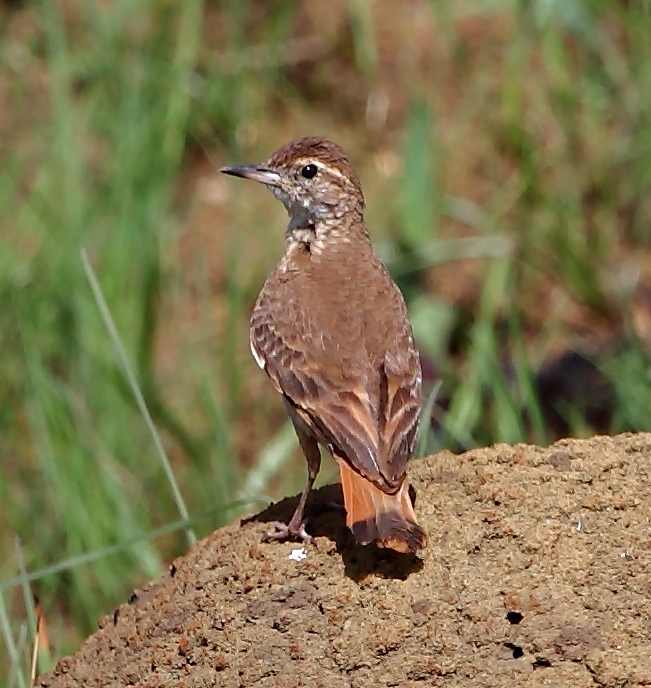

Conservation status
- Vulnerable (IUCN 3.1)

Scientific classification
- Kingdom: Animalia
- Phylum: Chordata
- Class: Aves
- Order: Passeriformes
- Family: Furnariidae
- Genus: Geositta
- Species: G. poeciloptera

Binomial name
- Geositta poeciloptera (Wied, 1830)

Synonyms
- Geobates poecilopterus (Wied, 1830)

= Campo miner =

Species of bird

The campo miner (Geositta poeciloptera) is a Vulnerable species of bird in the subfamily Sclerurinae, the leaftossers and miners, of the ovenbird family Furnariidae. It is found in Bolivia and Brazil, and as a vagrant in Paraguay.

== Taxonomy and systematics ==
The campo miner was originally placed alone in genus Geobates and has sometimes been treated there since, but genetic data place it firmly in Geositta. It is monotypic.

== Description ==
The campo miner is a small member of its genus. It is 11 to 12 cm (4.3 to 4.7 in) long and weighs 17 to 19 g (0.60 to 0.67 oz). The sexes are alike. It has a dull rufescent brown face with a buff supercilium. It is dull grayish brown from its crown to its rump; the crown has vague brown spots and its rump and uppertail coverts have a rufescent tinge. Its tail is short; its feathers are rufous with a blackish brown band near the end. Its wing coverts are dark brownish with paler edges. Its axillaries ("wing pits") are cinnamon. Its flight feathers are blackish with a wide chestnut-rufous band that shows in flight. Its throat is whitish, its upper breast dull buff with brown flecks, its lower breast and belly whitish, and its flanks and undertail coverts pale rufous. Its iris is brown, its shortish bill is dark horn or blackish with a pale horn or pinkish gray base to the mandible, and its legs and feet are pale brown to pale gray or even dull pinkish.

== Distribution and habitat ==
The campo miner is found in south-central Brazil, in an area roughly bounded by the states of Mato Grosso, Bahia, and Paraná, and in northeastern Santa Cruz Department in Bolivia. There is also at least one record in Paraguay. It inhabits campo grasslands and cerrado, open landscapes with at most scattered trees. It favors recently burned areas, especially for breeding. In elevation it ranges between 500 and 1,250 m (1,600 and 4,100 ft).

== Behavior ==
=== Movement ===
The campo miner is non-migratory, but makes local movements among areas of suitable habitat.

=== Feeding ===
The campo miner forages singly or in pairs. It gleans food from the ground while hopping, not walking. Its diet is mostly arthropods; known items include Hymenoptera, Coleoptera, Mantidae, and spiders.

=== Breeding ===
The campo miner's breeding season has not been fully documented but includes at least September and October. The three known nests were in side chambers in armadillo burrows; the chambers were lined with dead grass and hair. The one clutch was of three eggs.

=== Vocalization ===
The campo miner's display flight song is a "high, level, hurried, rolling 'turruturrut---' " that lasts 15 to 20 seconds. Its flight call is "pit-pit".

== Status ==
The IUCN originally assessed the campo miner as Near Threatened but since 2009 has rated it as Vulnerable. Its population size is not known and is believed to be rapidly decreasing. At least two-thirds of its original cerrado habitat has been converted to cropland, cattle ranching, and plantations of non-native trees. Ironically, fire suppression has reduced its breeding habitat in some areas. It occurs in some protected areas but is considered generally uncommon to rare. Brazilian authorities declared it Endangered in 2014.
