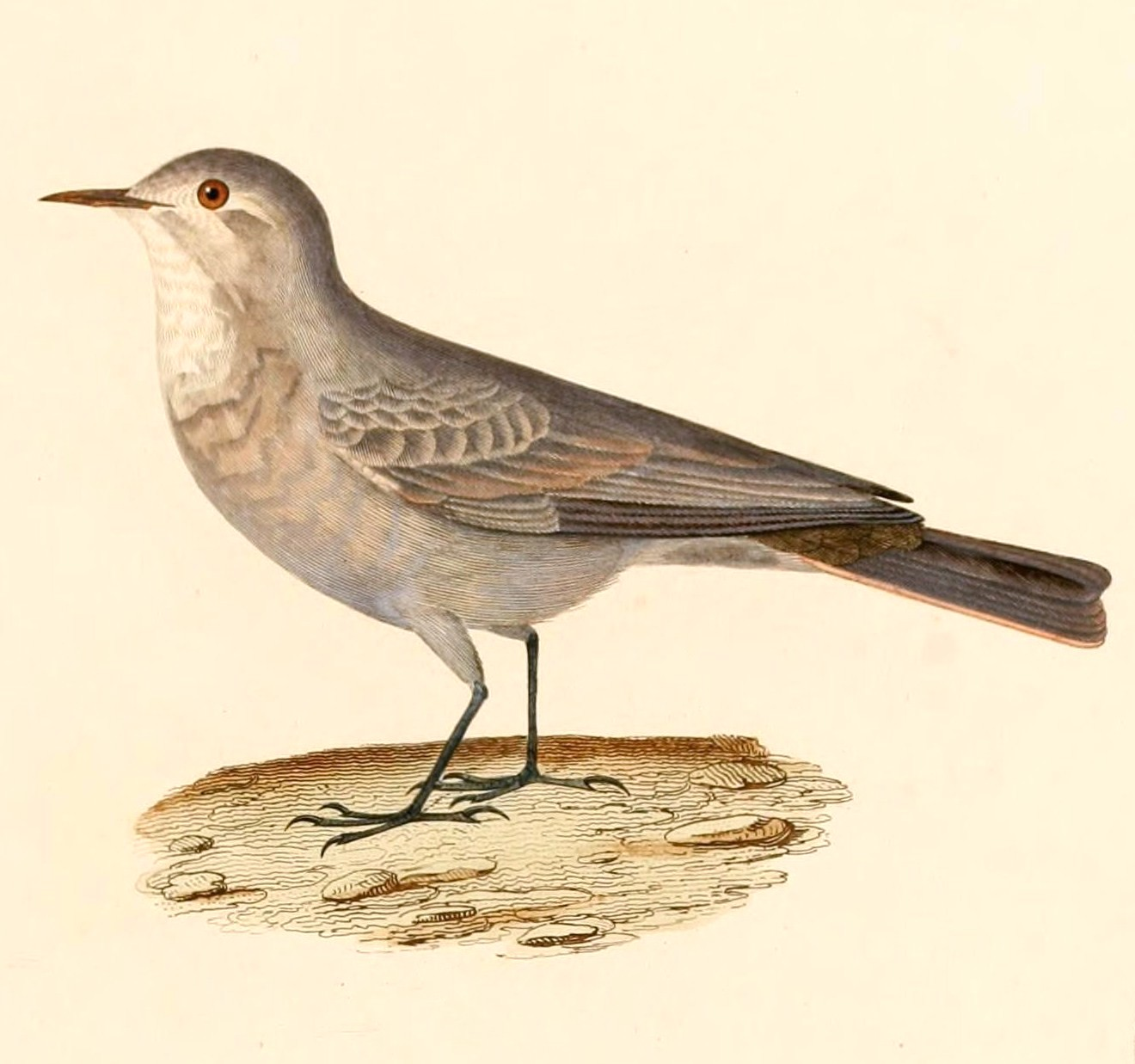

Conservation status
- Least Concern (IUCN 3.1)

Scientific classification
- Kingdom: Animalia
- Phylum: Chordata
- Class: Aves
- Order: Passeriformes
- Family: Furnariidae
- Genus: Geositta
- Species: G. maritima

Binomial name
- Geositta maritima (d'Orbigny & Lafresnaye, 1837)

= Greyish miner =

Species of bird

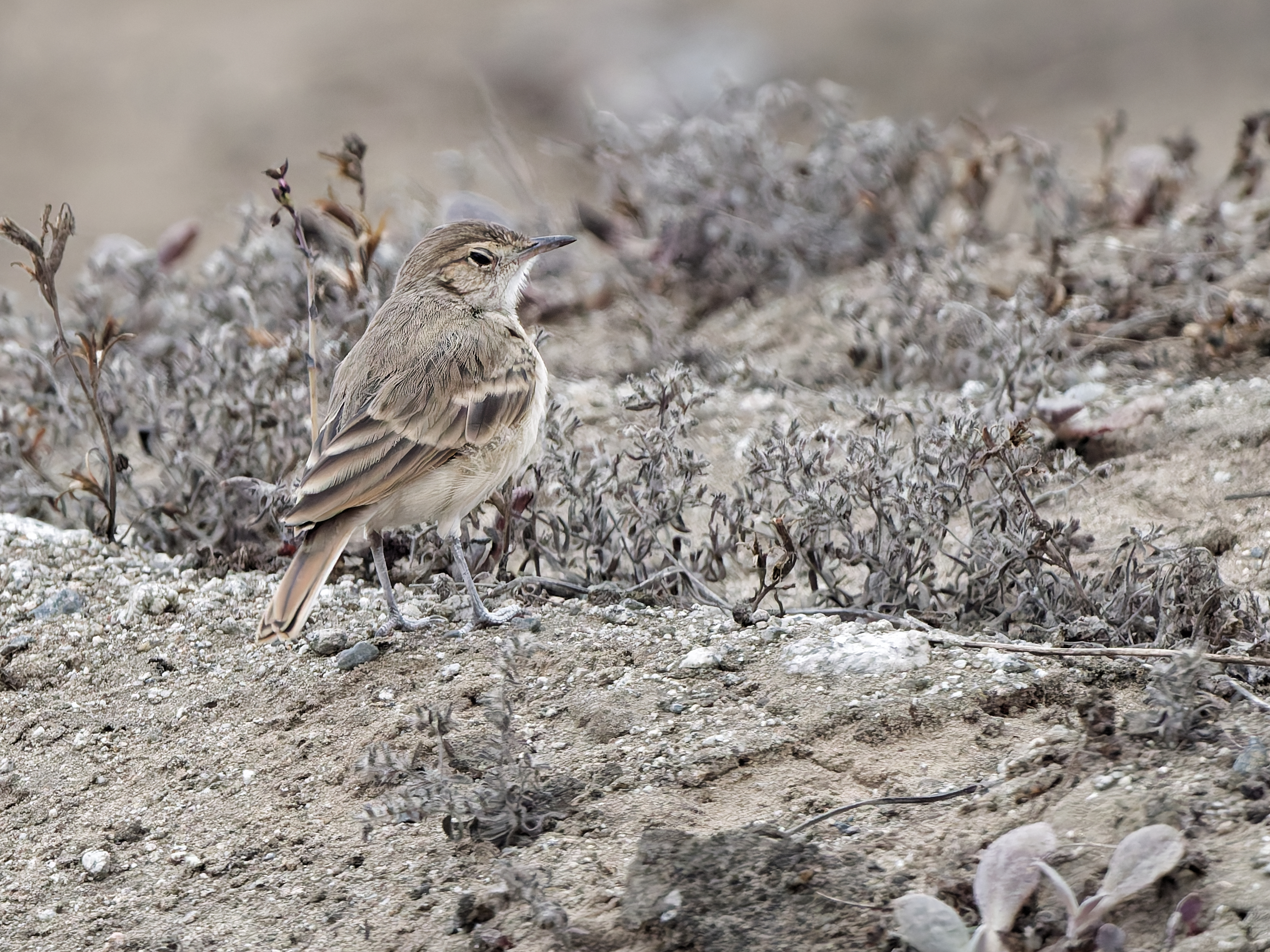
Greyish Miner in Peru

The greyish miner (Geositta maritima) is a species of bird in the subfamily Sclerurinae, the leaftossers and miners, of the ovenbird family Furnariidae. It is found in Chile and Peru.

== Taxonomy and systematics ==
The greyish miner is monotypic.

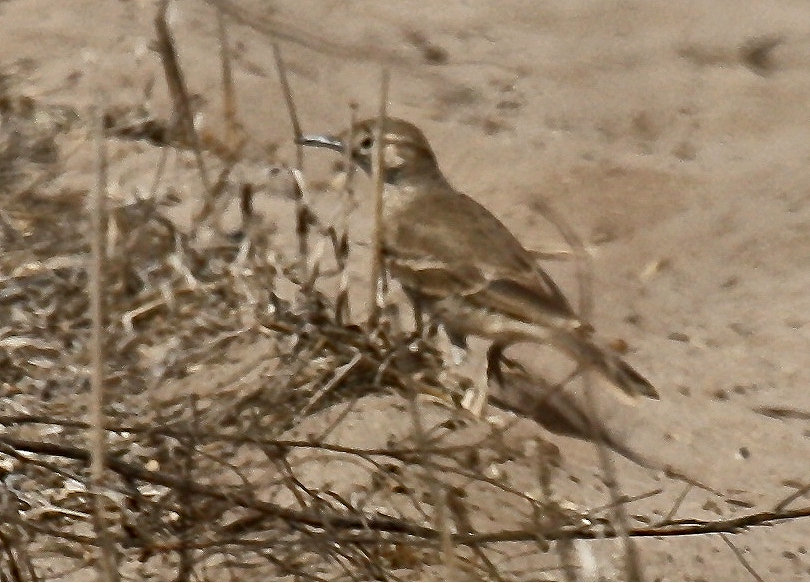
Reserva Nacionale de LaChay, Peru

== Description ==
The greyish miner is a smallish member of its genus. It is 12 to 15 cm (4.7 to 5.9 in) long and weighs about 16 to 17 g (0.56 to 0.60 oz). The sexes are alike. Adults have a pale gray-brown face with a faint creamy supercilium. Their upperparts are pale gray-brown. Their central tail feathers are also gray-brown. The rest are black with white outer webs on the outermost pair. Their wing coverts are gray-brown with wide sandy brown edges and their flight feathers are dusky brown. Their chin and throat are white and the rest of their underparts are creamy white with pinkish buff flanks. Their iris is brown and their short straight bill, legs, and feet are slate gray to black. Juveniles are similar to adults but overall buffier.

== Distribution and habitat ==
The greyish miner is primarily a coastal bird though it does occasionally range somewhat inland on the coastal plain. It occurs in a fairly narrow band from at least Peru's Department of Ancash south to Chile's Atacama Region. Its habitat is described as "desolate" and is characterized by extreme aridity; sand, gravel, and rock substrate; and an almost complete lack of vegetation. In elevation it is usually below 2,450 m (8,000 ft) and rarely to 3,500 m (11,500 ft) in Peru. In Chile it occurs between 500 and 2,800 m (1,600 and 9,200 ft).

== Behavior ==
=== Movement ===
The greyish miner is non-migratory.

=== Feeding ===
Little detail is known about the greyish miner's foraging behavior and diet. It is known to be terrestrial and usually found singly or in pairs. Based on stomach contents of a specimen, its diet is seeds and insects.

=== Breeding ===
Almost nothing is known about the greyish miner's breeding biology. Only one nest has been found, and it was not described in detail. The species is assumed to nest in a burrow with a small chamber at its end like others of its genus.

=== Vocalization ===
The greyish miner's song has been rendered as "an unmusical te-cherrrr..., sometimes followed by a longer series of notes ke ke ke ke ...". It has a variety of calls rendered as "plyt-plyt", "jyp", "a rasping tch-trr", and "a short, somewhat squeaky kew".

== Status ==
The IUCN has assessed the greyish miner as being of Least Concern. It has a fairly large range, and though its population size is not known it is believed to be stable. No immediate threats have been identified. Various authors describe its abundance as from uncommon to locally common. "Human activity probably has little direct effect on the Grayish Miner, which occupies desolate, arid regions with low human populations."
