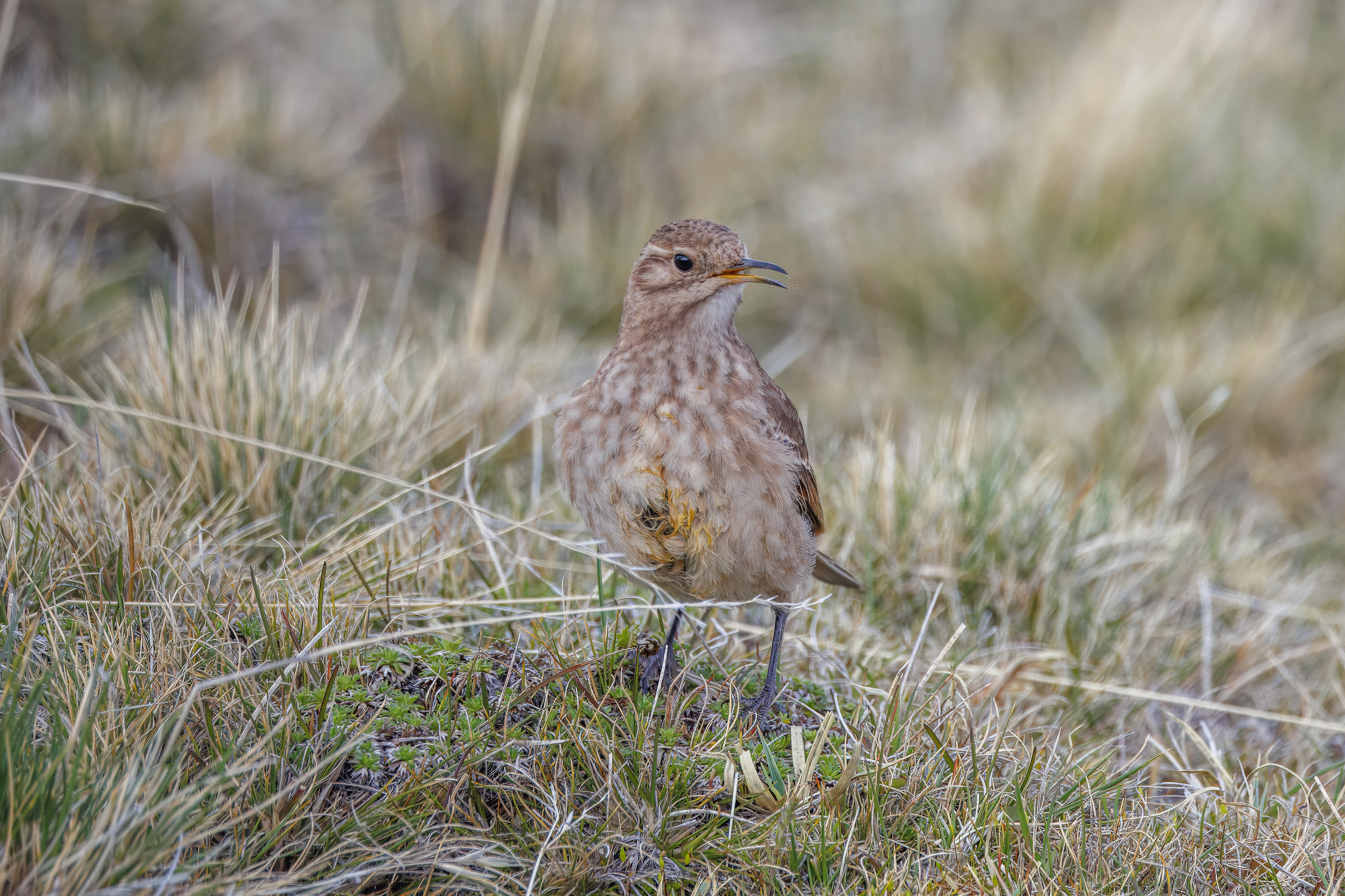
- in Torres del Paine, Chile

Conservation status
- Least Concern (IUCN 3.1)

Scientific classification
- Kingdom: Animalia
- Phylum: Chordata
- Class: Aves
- Order: Passeriformes
- Family: Furnariidae
- Genus: Geositta
- Species: G. cunicularia

Binomial name
- Geositta cunicularia (Vieillot, 1816)

= Common miner =

Species of bird

The common miner (Geositta cunicularia) is a passerine bird in the subfamily Sclerurinae, the leaftossers and miners, of the ovenbird family Furnariidae. It is found in Argentina, Bolivia, Brazil, Chile, Peru, and Uruguay.

== Taxonomy and systematics ==
Taxonomists assign these nine subspecies to the common miner:

- Geositta cunicularia juninensis Taczanowski, 1884
- Geositta cunicularia titicacae Zimmer, JT, 1935
- Geositta cunicularia frobeni (Philippi & Landbeck, 1864)
- Geositta cunicularia georgei Koepcke, 1965
- Geositta cunicularia deserticolor Hellmayr, 1924
- Geositta cunicularia fissirostris (Kittlitz, 1835) – the type species of the genus.
- G. c. contrerasi Nores & Yzurieta, 1980
- G. c. hellmayri Peters, JL, 1925
- G. c. cunicularia (Vieillot, 1816)

Subspecies G. c. juninensis, G. c. titicacae, and G. c. frobeni might instead be members of a separate species. Subspecies G. c. georgei and G. c. deserticolor might also be members of another separate species.

Among members of genus Geositta, the common miner is most closely related to the puna miner (Geositta punensis).

== Description ==
The common miner is a medium-size member of its genus. It is 14 to 17 cm (5.5 to 6.7 in) long and weighs 20 to 34 g (0.71 to 1.2 oz). The sexes are alike. The nominate subspecies G. c. cunicularia has a pale brownish face with a wide whitish supercilium and a vague darker "moustache" and line behind the eye. It has a dull grayish brown crown and upperparts; the former has dark brown spots. Its uppertail coverts are dull grayish brown with pale brownish tips. Its tail feathers have buff-whitish bases and blackish ends with pale rufescent between them. The pale area is progressively larger from the innermost to the outer feathers and the outermost have almost entirely white outer webs. Dull brownish wing coverts with pale buff tips form distinct wing bars. Its flight feathers are dull brownish with a wide pale rufous band. Its throat is whitish, its breast buff-white with wavy brownish streaks, its belly pale buffy whitish with a pale cinnamon tinge on the flanks, and its undertail coverts whitish. Its iris is brown to yellowish brown, its medium-length bill is black to brown with sometimes a pale base to the mandible, and its legs and feet are dark gray to black.

The other subspecies of the common miner differ from the nominate and each other thus:

- Geositta cunicularia titicacae: larger, paler, and buffier; creamier tail base; less distinct streaks on breast
- Geositta cunicularia juninensis: paler and buffier than titicacae; few to no breast streaks
- Geositta cunicularia frobeni: buffy white uppertail coverts; whitish tail base; whiter underparts than juninensis
- Geositta cunicularia deserticolor: smaller and paler than frobeni; gray uppertail coverts
- Geositta cunicularia georgei: like deserticolor but darker wings and tail; pale yellowish buff underparts; heavier breast streaks
- Geositta cunicularia fissirostris: slightly grayer above and whiter below than nominate; darker chest markings
- Geositta cunicularia hellmayri: like fissirostris but whiter uppetail coverts, paler tail base, and paler chest markings
- Geositta cunicularia contrerasi: smallest but overlaps with hellmayri; blackish wings and tail are darkest of all; creamy buff underparts; dark brownish or blackish spots on breast

== Distribution and habitat ==
The subspecies of the common miner are found thus:

- Geositta cunicularia juninensis: Andes of central Peru's departments of Junín and Huancavelica
- Geositta cunicularia titicacae: Andes of southern Peru, Bolivia east to Cochabamba Department, northern Chile to the Tarapacá Region, and northwestern Argentina to Mendoza Province
- Geositta cunicularia frobeni: Pacific slope of the Andes in southern Peru between Arequipa and Tacna departments
- Geositta cunicularia georgei: coastal Peru's Ica and Arequipa departments
- Geositta cunicularia deserticolor: coastally from Arequipa Department in Peru south to Chile's Atacama Region
- Geositta cunicularia fissirostris: central Chile from coastal Atacama to Los Lagos regions and east to the Andean foothills
- Geositta cunicularia contrerasi: Sierras Grandes in Argentina's Córdoba Province
- Geositta cunicularia hellmayri: Andes of central Chile and southwestern Argentina (south of titicacae)
- Geositta cunicularia cunicularia: lowlands of extreme southeastern Brazil, Uruguay, eastern Argentina, and southern Chile south to Tierra del Fuego

Though the International Ornithological Committee includes Paraguay in the range of cunicularia, the South American Classification Committee of the American Ornithological Society has no records in that country.

The common miner inhabits open landscapes including puna and temperate grasslands, arid lowland scrublands, and moister restinga scrublands. Most are flat to gently sloping and have sandy soils, short grass, and scattered rocks and shrubs. The species' distribution tends to be patchy. In elevation it ranges from sea level to 5,000 m (16,000 ft).

== Behavior ==
=== Movement ===
The Andean subspecies of the common miner appear to be mostly year-round residents but make some movement downslope after the breeding season. G. c. hellmayri moves north after breeding. The southern subpopulation of the nominate G. c. cunicularia also moves north but the division between it and the resident more northerly subpopulation is unclear.

=== Feeding ===
The common miner forages singly or in pairs. It gleans food from the ground while hopping, not walking. Its diet is mostly arthropods including adult and larval flies and beetles; seeds are a minor component.

=== Breeding ===
The common miner breeds in the austral summer, generally between September and December. It is thought to be monogamous. It excavates a horizontal tunnel with an enlarged chamber at the end in an earthen bank or slope, and pads the chamber with grass, hair, feathers, and other soft material. The clutch size is two or three eggs and both parents incubate them and provision the nestlings.

=== Vocalization ===
The common miner sings during a display flight. The nominate subspecies's song is two notes sounding like "ta whit-ta whit" and its flight call is "a nasal 'dee-dijer' or 'er?' ". The other subspecies sing "a loud, shrill...'de-dirr-rr-rrr' " and their flight calls are "a high-pitched 'keep' or rich, sweet 'pip' ". All subspecies make trilled notes as well.

== Conservation status ==
The IUCN has assessed the common miner as being of Least Concern. It has a very large range, but its population size is not known and is believed to be decreasing. No immediate threats have been identified. In habitats with light to moderate human disturbance it is considered common to locally abundant. It occurs in several protected areas. However, in southeastern Brazil coastal development may become a threat.
