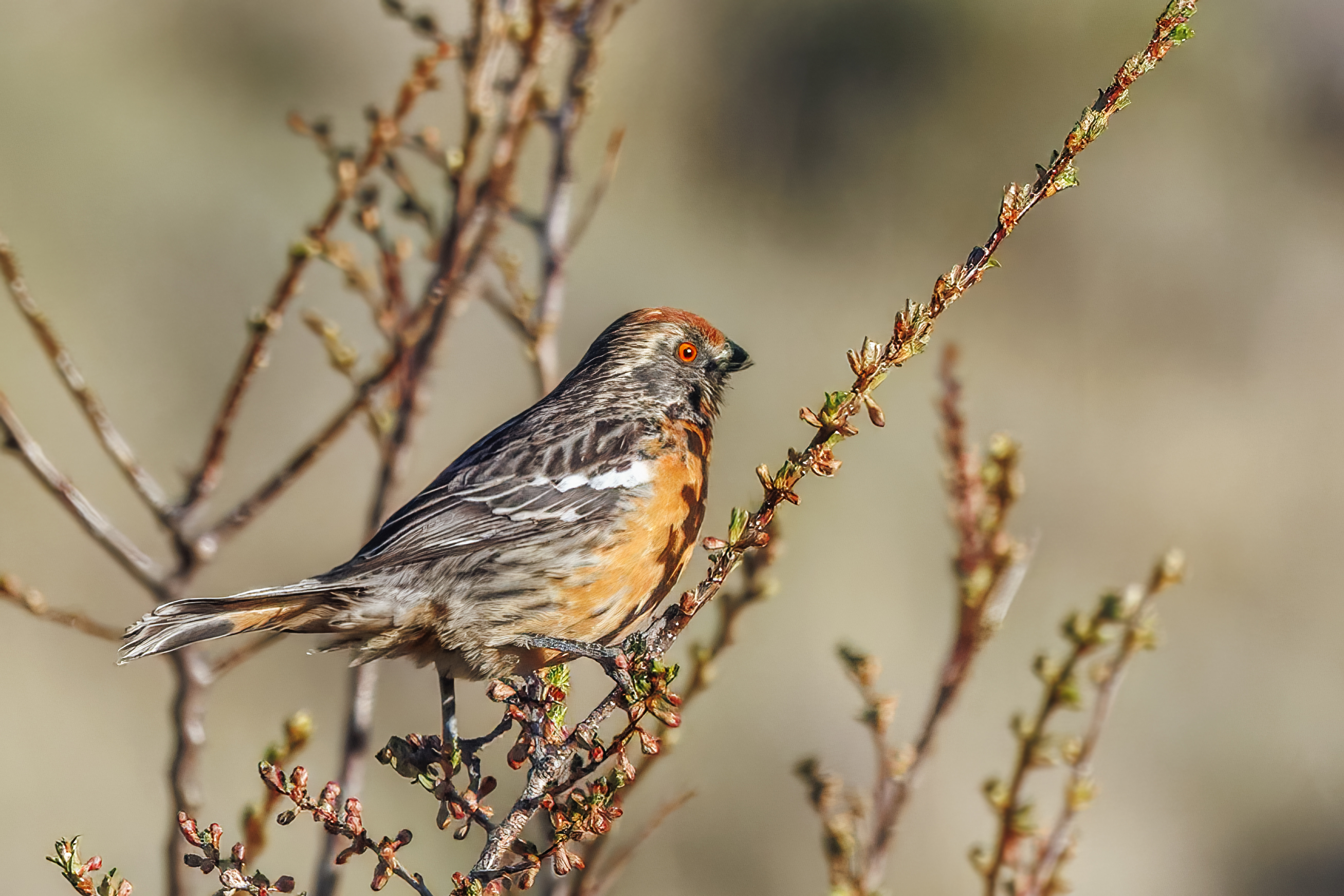
- in Torres del Paine, Chile

Conservation status
- Least Concern (IUCN 3.1)

Scientific classification
- Kingdom: Animalia
- Phylum: Chordata
- Class: Aves
- Order: Passeriformes
- Family: Cotingidae
- Genus: Phytotoma
- Species: P. rara

Binomial name
- Phytotoma rara Molina, 1782

= Rufous-tailed plantcutter =

Species of bird

The rufous-tailed plantcutter (Phytotoma rara), sometimes called the Chilean plantcutter, is a passerine bird of southern South America, now placed in the cotinga family. It is a medium-sized bird about 19 centimetres (7.5 in) long with a long black tail with a red base. Males have greyish-brown upper parts, a chestnut crown and breast, and dark facial markings. Females are similar but lack the chestnut crown and have streaked, buff underparts. There is a wing bar which is white in the male and buff in the female. This is a fairly common species with a wide range, and the International Union for Conservation of Nature has rated its conservation status as being of "least concern".

== Description ==
It is a stocky bird, 18-20 centimetres in length, with short wings and a red eye. The longish tail is black with a reddish base. The upperparts of the male are grey-brown with dark streaks while the crown and underparts are chestnut-coloured. There is a white bar on the wing and a pattern of dark and pale areas on the face. Females have buff underparts with brown streaks and have buff rather than white in the wings. They do not have the males' chestnut crown but may show a cinnamon wash to the forehead and throat. The song is a series of stuttering notes followed by a rasping trill similar to the noise made by a fishing reel.

The finch-like bill is short and thick with serrated edges and is used for stripping off buds, leaves and fruits. Insects are eaten on occasions and are fed to the chicks.

== Distribution and habitat ==
The rufous-tailed plantcutter is found further south than any other cotinga, inhabiting scrub, forest edge and river valleys in Chile and western Argentina. The range extends from Magallanes region north to Atacama in Chile and from Santa Cruz north to Mendoza in Argentina. Birds breeding in southern or high-altitude regions move northwards or towards the lowlands in winter. It has been recorded as a vagrant to the Falkland Islands. Birds are often seen in gardens, farmland and orchards and are sometimes considered to be a pest. The nest is a cup of root fibres and twigs built in a fork in a shrub or tree. Two to four eggs are laid, they are blue-green with dark spots concentrated at the larger end.

== Status ==
This bird has a very wide range and though not particularly common, is presumed to have a large total population. The population trend is thought to be stable and the International Union for Conservation of Nature has rated the bird's conservation status as being of "least concern".
