= Christian Ludwig Landbeck =

German ornithologist (1807–1890)

Christian Ludwig (Luis) Landbeck (11 December 1807 – 3 September 1890) was a German ornithologist.

He took part in an expedition to Chile and described many species of birds in collaboration with Rodolfo Amando Philippi. He directed the publication of the Naturgeschichte aller Vögel Europas ("Natural history of all European birds").

Although the two scientists jointly described many species, the cactus Cereus coerulescens var. landbeckii was named by Philippi in honour of his colleague. Philippi also named the following (non-avian) species after Landbeck:

- Calceolaria landbeckii: (1860), botanical species in the family Calceolariaceae.
- Gnaphalium landbeckii: (1864), botanical species in the tribe Gnaphalieae.
- Bombylius landbecki: (1865), insect from the family Bombyliidae.
- Allidiostoma landbecki: (1873), insect from the subfamily Allidiostomatinae.

Another plant named after him is Tillandsia landbeckii

== Publications ==
- Nachtrag zur Aufzählung der Vögel Würtemberg, 1836 - Addendum to supplement of birds in Württemberg.
- Systematisches Verzeichniss der Vögel Württembergs, 1846 - Systematic directory of birds in Württemberg.
