= List of birds of Atacama Region =

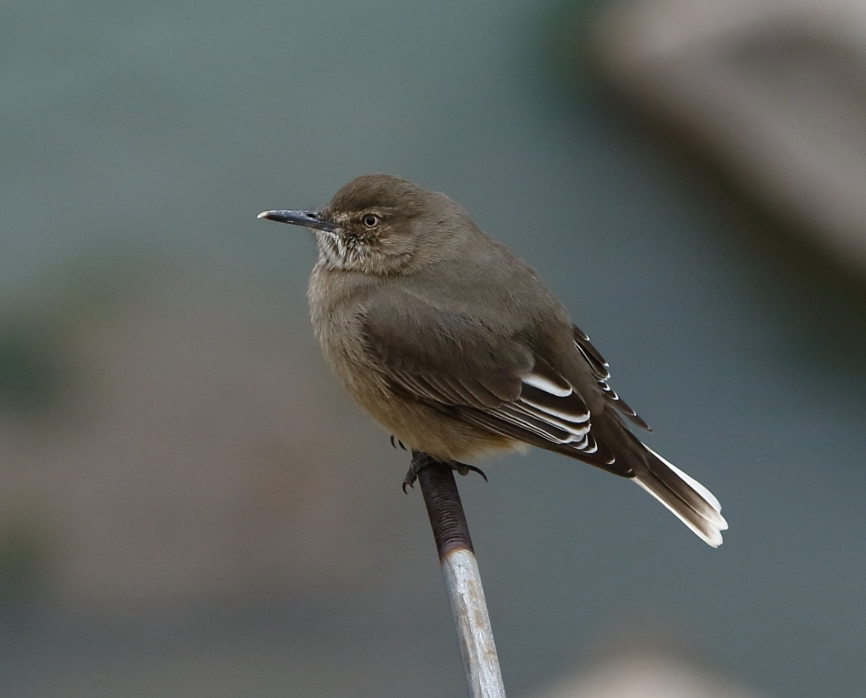
Black-billed shrike-tyrant

This list of birds of Atacama Region includes species documented in the Chilean region of Atacama. The backbone of this list is provided by Avibase, and all additions that differ from this list have citations. As of September 2025, there are 291 recorded bird species in the region.

The following tags note species in each of those categories:

- (A) Accidental - species not regularly occurring in Atacama Region
- (E) Endemic to Chile - species that is only found in Chile
- (I) Introduced - species that is not native to Atacama Region

== Rheas ==
Order: Rheiformes Family: Rheidae

- Lesser rhea (Rhea pennata)

== Tinamous ==
Order: Tinamiformes Family: Tinamidae

- Chilean tinamou (Nothoprocta perdicaria) (E)
- Puna tinamou (Tinamotis pentlandii)

== Ducks, geese, and waterfowl ==
Order: Anseriformes Family: Anatidae

- White-faced whistling-duck (Dendrocygna viduata) (A)
- Black-necked swan (Cygnus melancoryphus)
- Coscoroba swan (Coscoroba coscoroba)
- Andean goose (Oressochen melanopterus)
- Upland goose (Chloephaga picta) (A)
- Crested duck (Lophonetta specularioides)
- Spectacled duck (Speculanas specularis)
- Torrent duck (Merganetta armata)
- Silver teal (Spatula versicolor)
- Cinnamon teal (Spatula cyanoptera)
- Red shoveler (Spatula platalea)
- Chiloe wigeon (Mareca sibilatrix)
- White-cheeked pintail (Anas bahamensis)
- Yellow-billed pintail (Anas georgica)
- Yellow-billed teal (Anas flavirostris)
- Rosy-billed pochard (Netta peposaca) (A)
- Black-headed duck (Heteronetta atricapilla)
- Andean duck (Oxyura ferruginea)
- Lake duck (Oxyura vittata)

== New World quail ==
Order: Galliformes Family: Odontophoridae

- California quail (Callipepla californica) (I)

== Doves and pigeons ==
Order: Columbiformes Family: Columbidae

- Rock dove (Columba livia) (I)
- Chilean pigeon (Patagioenas araucana)
- Ruddy ground dove (Columbina talpacoti) (A)
- Picui ground dove (Columbina picui)
- Croaking ground dove (Columbina cruziana)
- Black-winged ground dove (Metriopelia melanoptera)
- Golden-spotted ground dove (Metriopelia aymara)
- West Peruvian dove (Zenaida meloda)
- Eared dove (Zenaida auriculata)

== Nightjars ==
Order: Caprimulgiformes Family: Caprimulgidae

- Band-winged nightjar (Systellura longirostris)
- Scissor-tailed nightjar (Hydropsalis torquata) (A)

== Hummingbirds ==
Order: Apodiformes Family: Trochilidae

- Green-backed firecrown (Sephanoides sephaniodes)
- Andean hillstar (Oreotrochilus estella)
- White-sided hillstar (Oreotrochilus leucopleurus)
- Giant hummingbird (Patagona gigas)
- Oasis hummingbird (Rhodopis vesper)

== Rails ==
Order: Gruiformes Family: Rallidae

- Plumbeous rail (Pardirallus sanguinolentus)
- Spot-flanked gallinule (Porphyriops melanops)
- Common gallinule (Gallinula galeata)
- Red-fronted coot (Fulica rufifrons)
- Horned coot (Fulica cornuta)
- Giant coot (Fulica gigantea)
- Red-gartered coot (Fulica armillata)
- Slate-coloured coot (Fulica ardesiaca)
- White-winged coot (Fulica leucoptera)
- Black rail (Laterallus jamaicensis)

== Stilts and avocets ==
Order: Charadriiformes Family: Recurvirostridae

- Black-necked stilt (Himantopus mexicanus)
- Andean avocet (Recurvirostra andina)

== Oystercatchers ==
Order: Charadriiformes Family: Haematopodidae

- American oystercatcher (Haematopus palliatus)
- Blackish oystercatcher (Haematopus ater)

== Plovers and Lapwings ==
Order: Charadriiformes Family: Charadriidae

- Black-bellied plover (Pluvialis squatarola)
- American golden plover (Pluvialis dominica)
- Tawny-throated dotterel (Oreopholus ruficollis)
- Diademed sandpiper-plover (Phegornis mitchellii)
- Rufous-chested dotterel (Zonibyx modestus)
- Killdeer (Charadrius vociferus) (A)
- Semipalmated plover (Charadrius semipalmatus)
- Southern lapwing (Vanellus chilensis)
- Andean lapwing (Vanellus resplendens)
- Wilson's plover (Anarhynchus wilsonia) (A)
- Collared plover (Anarhynchus collaris)
- Puna plover (Anarhynchus alticola)
- Two-banded plover (Anarhynchus falklandicus)
- Snowy plover (Anarhynchus nivosus)

== Seedsnipes ==
Order: Charadriiformes Family: Thinocoridae

- Rufous-bellied seedsnipe (Attagis gayi)
- Grey-breasted seedsnipe (Thinocorus orbignyianus)
- Least seedsnipe (Thinocorus rumicivorus)

== Sandpipers ==
Order: Charadriiformes Family: Scolopacidae

- Upland sandpiper (Bartramia longicauda)
- Whimbrel (Numenius phaeopus)
- Hudsonian godwit (Limosa haemastica)
- Marbled godwit (Limosa fedoa) (A)
- Puna snipe (Gallinago andina)
- Magellanic snipe (Gallinago magellanica)
- Wilson's phalarope (Phalaropus tricolor)
- Red phalarope (Phalaropus fulicarius)
- Red-necked phalarope (Phalaropus lobatus) (A)
- Spotted sandpiper (Actitis macularius)
- Solitary sandpiper (Tringa solitaria) (A)
- Lesser yellowlegs (Tringa flavipes)
- Willet (Tringa semipalmata)
- Greater yellowlegs (Tringa melanoleuca)
- Ruddy turnstone (Arenaria interpres)
- Red knot (Calidris canutus)
- Surfbird (Calidris virgata)
- Stilt sandpiper (Calidris himantopus)
- Sanderling (Calidris alba)
- Baird's sandpiper (Calidris bairdii)
- White-rumped sandpiper (Calidris fuscicollis)
- Least sandpiper (Calidris minutilla)
- Pectoral sandpiper (Calidris melanotos)
- Western sandpiper (Calidris mauri)
- Semipalmated sandpiper (Calidris pusilla)

== Skuas and jaegers ==
Order: Charadriiformes Family: Stercorariidae

- Long-tailed jaeger (Stercorarius longicaudus)
- Parasitic jaeger (Stercorarius parasiticus)
- Pomarine jaeger (Stercorarius pomarinus)
- Chilean skua (Stercorarius chilensis)

== Gulls, terns, and skimmers ==
Order: Charadriiformes Family: Laridae

- Swallow-tailed gull (Creagrus furcatus)
- Andean gull (Chroicocephalus serranus)
- Brown-hooded gull (Chroicocephalus maculipennis)
- Grey gull (Leucophaeus modestus)
- Franklin's gull (Leucophaeus pipixcan)
- Belcher's gull (Larus belcheri)
- Kelp gull (Larus dominicanus)
- Black skimmer (Rynchops niger)
- Sooty tern (Onychoprion fuscatus)
- Inca tern (Larosterna inca)
- Black tern (Chlidonias niger) (A)
- Snowy-crowned tern (Sterna trudeaui)
- South American tern (Sterna hirundinacea)
- Common tern (Sterna hirundo)
- Elegant tern (Thalasseus elegans)

== Flamingos ==
Order: Phoenicopteriformes Family: Phoenicopteridae

- Chilean flamingo (Phoenicopterus chilensis)
- Andean flamingo (Phoenicoparrus andinus)
- James's flamingo (Phoenicoparrus jamesi)

== Grebes ==
Order: Podicipediformes Family: Podicipedidae

- White-tufted grebe (Rollandia rolland)
- Pied-billed grebe (Podilymbus podiceps)
- Great grebe (Podiceps major)
- Silvery grebe (Podiceps occipitalis)

== Tropicbirds ==
Order: Phaethontiformes Family: Phaethontidae

- Red-billed tropicbird (Phaethon aethereus)
- Red-tailed tropicbird (Phaethon rubricauda)

== Penguins ==
Order: Sphenisciformes Family: Spheniscidae

- Little penguin (Eudyptula minor) (A)
- Humboldt penguin (Spheniscus humboldti)
- Magellanic penguin (Spheniscus magellanicus)

== Albatrosses ==
Order: Procellariiformes Family: Diomedeidae

- Northern royal albatross (Diomedea sanfordi)
- Southern royal albatross (Diomedea epomophora)
- Waved albatross (Phoebastria irrorata) (A)
- Buller's albatross (Thalassarche bulleri) (A)
- White-capped albatross (Thalassarche cauta) (A)
- Salvin's albatross (Thalassarche salvini)
- Chatham albatross (Thalassarche eremita)
- Black-browed albatross (Thalassarche melanophris)

== Southern storm petrels ==
Order: Procellariiformes Family: Oceanitidae

- Wilson's storm-petrel (Oceanites oceanicus)
- Elliot's storm-petrel (Oceanites gracilis)
- White-bellied storm-petrel (Fregetta grallaria)
- Black-bellied storm-petrel (Fregetta tropica)

== Northern storm petrels ==
Order: Procellariiformes Family: Hydrobatidae

- Ringed storm-petrel (Hydrobates hornbyi)
- Wedge-rumped storm-petrel (Hydrobates tethys)
- Black storm-petrel (Hydrobates melania)
- Markham's storm-petrel (Hydrobates markhami)

== Petrels and shearwaters ==
Order: Procellariiformes Family: Procellariidae

- Southern giant-petrel (Macronectes giganteus)
- Northern giant-petrel (Macronectes halli)
- Southern fulmar (Fulmarus glacialoides)
- Pintado petrel (Daption capense)
- Juan Fernandez petrel (Pterodroma externa) (E)
- Masatierra petrel (Pterodroma defilippiana)
- Antarctic prion (Pachyptila desolata)
- Slender-billed prion (Pachyptila belcheri)
- Grey petrel (Procellaria cinerea)
- White-chinned petrel (Procellaria aequinoctialis)
- Westland petrel (Procellaria westlandica)
- Pink-footed shearwater (Ardenna creatopus)
- Buller's shearwater (Ardenna bulleri)
- Sooty shearwater (Ardenna grisea)
- Manx shearwater (Puffinus puffinus) (A)
- Peruvian diving-petrel (Pelecanoides garnotii)

== Storks ==
Order: Pelecaniformes Family: Ciconiidae

- Wood stork (Mycteria americana) (A)

== Frigatebirds ==
Order: Pelecaniformes Family: Fregatidae

- Magnificent frigatebird (Fregata magnificens) (A)

== Boobies and gannets ==
Order: Pelecaniformes Family: Sulidae

- Cocos booby (Sula brewsteri) (A)
- Masked booby (Sula dactylatra)
- Nazca booby (Sula granti) (A)
- Peruvian booby (Sula variegata)

== Cormorants ==
Order: Pelecaniformes Family: Phalacrocoracidae

- Red-legged cormorant (Poikilocarbo gaimardi)
- Neotropic cormorant (Phalacrocorax brasilianum)
- Guanay cormorant (Leucocarbo bougainvillii)

== Ibises and spoonbills ==
Order: Pelecaniformes Family: Threskiornithidae

- White-faced ibis (Plegadis chihi)
- Black-faced ibis (Theristicus melanopis)
- Roseate spoonbill (Platalea ajaja) (A)

== Pelicans ==
Order: Pelecaniformes Family: Pelecanidae

- Peruvian pelican (Pelecanus thagus)

== Herons and egrets ==
Order: Pelecaniformes Family: Ardeidae

- Stripe-backed bittern (Ixobrychus involucris)
- Yellow-crowned night-heron (Nyctanassa violacea) (A)
- Black-crowned night-heron (Nycticorax nycticorax)
- Little blue heron (Egretta caerulea)
- Tricoloured heron (Egretta tricolor) (A)
- Snowy egret (Egretta thula)
- Striated heron (Butorides striata) (A)
- Western cattle egret (Bubulcus ibis)
- Great egret (Ardea alba)
- Cocoi heron (Ardea cocoi)

== New World vultures ==
Order: Cathartiformes Family: Cathartidae

- Turkey vulture (Cathartes aura)
- Black vulture (Coragyps atratus)
- Andean condor (Vultur gryphus)

== Ospreys ==
Order: Accipitriformes Family: Pandionidae

- Osprey (Pandion haliaetus)

== Hawks, kites, and eagles ==
Order: Accipitriformes Family: Accipitridae

- White-tailed kite (Elanus leucurus)
- Swallow-tailed kite (Elanoides forficatus) (A)
- Cinereous harrier (Circus cinereus)
- Harris's hawk (Parabuteo unicinctus)
- Variable hawk (Geranoaetus polyosoma)
- Black-chested buzzard-eagle (Geranoaetus melanoleucus)
- White-throated hawk (Buteo albigula)

== Barn owls ==
Order: Strigiformes Family: Tytonidae

- American barn owl (Tyto furcata)

== Owls ==
Order: Strigiformes Family: Strigidae

- Lesser horned owl (Bubo magellanicus)
- Austral pygmy-owl (Glaucidium nana)
- Burrowing owl (Athene cunicularia)
- Short-eared owl (Asio flammeus)

== Falcons ==
Order: Falconiformes Family: Falconidae

- Crested caracara (Caracara plancus)
- Chimango caracara (Daptrius chimango)
- Mountain caracara (Daptrius megalopterus)
- American kestrel (Falco sparverius)
- Aplomado falcon (Falco femoralis)
- Peregrine falcon (Falco peregrinus)

== Parrots ==
Order: Psittaciformes Family: Psittacidae

- Mountain parakeet (Psilopsiagon aurifrons)
- Monk parakeet (Myiopsitta monachus) (I)
- Burrowing parakeet (Cyanoliseus patagonus)

== Tapaculos ==
Order: Passeriformes Family: Rhinocryptidae

- Moustached turca (Pteroptochos megapodius) (E)
- White-throated tapaculo (Scelorchilus albicollis) (E)
- Dusky tapaculo (Scytalopus fuscus) (E)

== Ovenbirds ==
Order: Passeriformes Family: Furnariidae

- Common miner (Geositta cunicularia)
- Puna miner (Geositta punensis)
- Rufous-banded miner (Geositta rufipennis)
- Greyish miner (Geositta maritima)
- Creamy-rumped miner (Geositta isabellina)
- Straight-billed earthcreeper (Ochetorhynchus ruficaudus)
- Crag chilia (Ochetorhynchus melanurus) (E)
- Wren-like rushbird (Phleocryptes melanops)
- Scale-throated earthcreeper (Upucerthia dumetaria)
- Buff-winged cinclodes (Cinclodes fuscus)
- Grey-flanked cinclodes (Cinclodes oustaleti)
- White-winged cinclodes (Cinclodes atacamensis)
- Dark-bellied cinclodes (Cinclodes patagonicus)
- Seaside cinclodes (Cinclodes nigrofumosus) (E)
- Plain-mantled tit-spinetail (Leptasthenura aegithaloides)
- Cordilleran canastero (Asthenes modesta)
- Sharp-billed canastero (Asthenes pyrrholeuca)
- Dusky-tailed canastero (Pseudasthenes humicola) (E)

== Cotingas ==
Order: Passeriformes Family: Cotingidae

- Rufous-tailed plantcutter (Phytotoma rara)

== Tyrant flycatchers ==
Order: Passeriformes Family: Tyrannidae

- Many-coloured rush-tyrant (Tachuris rubrigastra)
- Tufted tit-tyrant (Anairetes parulus)
- Greenish elaenia (Myiopagis viridicata) (A)
- White-crested elaenia (Elaenia albiceps)
- Austral negrito (Lessonia rufa)
- Andean negrito (Lessonia oreas)
- Spectacled tyrant (Hymenops perspicillatus)
- Spot-billed ground-tyrant (Muscisaxicola maculirostris)
- Cinereous ground-tyrant (Muscisaxicola cinereus)
- Ochre-naped ground-tyrant (Muscisaxicola flavinucha)
- Rufous-naped ground-tyrant (Muscisaxicola rufivertex)
- Dark-faced ground-tyrant (Muscisaxicola maclovianus)
- White-browed ground-tyrant (Muscisaxicola albilora)
- Cinnamon-bellied ground-tyrant (Muscisaxicola capistratus)
- Black-fronted ground-tyrant (Muscisaxicola frontalis)
- Fire-eyed diucon (Pyrope pyrope) (A)
- Black-billed shrike-tyrant (Agriornis montanus)
- Great shrike-tyrant (Agriornis lividus)
- Patagonian tyrant (Colorhamphus parvirostris)
- Great kiskadee (Pitangus sulphuratus) (A)
- Streaked flycatcher (Myiodynastes maculatus) (A)
- Tropical kingbird (Tyrannus melancholicus) (A)
- Eastern kingbird (Tyrannus tyrannus) (A)
- Fork-tailed flycatcher (Tyrannus savana) (A)

== Vireos and allies ==
Order: Passeriformes Family: Vireonidae

- Red-eyed vireo (Vireo olivaceus) (A)

== Swallows and martins ==
Order: Passeriformes Family: Hirundinidae

- Bank swallow (Riparia riparia)
- Chilean swallow (Tachycineta leucopyga)
- Grey-breasted martin (Progne chalybea) (A)
- Brown-chested martin (Progne tapera) (A)
- Blue-and-white swallow (Pygochelidon cyanoleuca)
- Tawny-headed swallow (Alopochelidon fucata) (A)
- Barn swallow (Hirundo rustica)
- Cliff swallow (Petrochelidon pyrrhonota)

== Wrens ==
Order: Passeriformes Family: Troglodytidae

- Southern house wren (Troglodytes musculus)
- Grass wren (Cistothorus platensis)

== Starlings ==
Order: Passeriformes Family: Sturnidae

- European starling (Sturnus vulgaris) (I)

== Mockingbirds, thrashers, and allies ==
Order: Passeriformes Family: Mimidae

- Chilean mockingbird (Mimus thenca) (E)
- White-banded mockingbird (Mimus triurus) (A)

== Thrushes ==
Order: Passeriformes Family: Turdidae

- Austral thrush (Turdus falcklandii)
- Creamy-bellied thrush (Turdus amaurochalinus) (A)
- Chiguanco thrush (Turdus chiguanco)

== Old World sparrows ==
Order: Passeriformes Family: Passeridae

- House sparrow (Passer domesticus) (I)

== Wagtails and pipits ==
Order: Passeriformes Family: Motacillidae

- Correndera pipit (Anthus correndera)

== Finches ==
Order: Passeriformes Family: Fringillidae

- Black siskin (Spinus atratus)
- Yellow-rumped siskin (Spinus uropygialis)
- Black-chinned siskin (Spinus barbatus)

== New World sparrows ==
Order: Passeriformes Family: Passerellidae

- Rufous-collared sparrow (Zonotrichia capensis)

== Icterids ==
Order: Passeriformes Family: Icteridae

- Bobolink (Dolichonyx oryzivorus) (A)
- White-browed meadowlark (Leistes superciliaris) (A)
- Long-tailed meadowlark (Leistes loyca)
- Shiny cowbird (Molothrus bonariensis)
- Austral blackbird (Curaeus curaeus)
- Greyish baywing (Agelaioides badius) (A)
- Yellow-winged blackbird (Agelasticus thilius)

== South American tanagers ==
Order: Passeriformes Family: Thraupidae

- Sayaca tanager (Thraupis sayaca) (A)
- Black-hooded sierra finch (Phrygilus atriceps)
- Grey-hooded sierra finch (Phrygilus gayi)
- Diuca finch (Diuca diuca)
- Plumbeous sierra finch (Geospizopsis unicolor)
- Mourning sierra finch (Rhopospina fruticeti)
- Band-tailed sierra finch (Rhopospina alaudina)
- Puna yellow-finch (Sicalis lutea)
- Bright-rumped yellow-finch (Sicalis uropygialis)
- Greater yellow-finch (Sicalis auriventris)
- Greenish yellow-finch (Sicalis olivascens)
- Grassland yellow-finch (Sicalis luteola)
