= List of birds of Aysén Region =

This list of birds of Aysén Region includes species documented in the Chilean region of Aysén. The backbone of this list is provided by Avibase, and all additions that differ from this list have citations. As of November 2024, there are 240 recorded bird species in the region.

The following tags note species in each of those categories:

- (A) Accidental - species not regularly occurring in Aysén Region
- (En) Endemic to Chile - species that is only found in Chile
- (I) Introduced - species that is not native to Aysén Region
- (Ex) Extirpated - species that are no longer found in Aysén Region but are still found elsewhere

== Rheas ==
Order: Rheiformes Family: Rheidae

- Lesser rhea (Rhea pennata)

== Tinamous ==
Order: Tinamiformes Family: Tinamidae

- Elegant crested-tinamou (Eudromia elegans)
- Patagonian tinamou (Tinamotis ingoufi)

== Ducks, geese, and waterfowl ==
Order: Anseriformes Family: Anatidae

- Black-necked swan (Cygnus melancoryphus)
- Coscoroba swan (Coscoroba coscoroba)
- Upland goose (Chloephaga picta)
- Kelp goose (Chloephaga hybrida)
- Ashy-headed goose (Chloephaga poliocephala)
- Flying steamer-duck (Tachyeres patachonicus)
- Flightless steamer-duck (Tachyeres pteneres)
- Crested duck (Lophonetta specularioides)
- Spectacled duck (Speculanas specularis)
- Torrent duck (Merganetta armata)
- Silver teal (Spatula versicolor)
- Cinnamon teal (Spatula cyanoptera)
- Red shoveler (Spatula platalea)
- Chiloe wigeon (Mareca sibilatrix)
- Yellow-billed pintail (Anas georgica)
- Yellow-billed teal (Anas flavirostris)
- Rosy-billed pochard (Netta peposaca) (A)
- Black-headed duck (Heteronetta atricapilla) (A)
- Andean duck (Oxyura ferruginea)
- Lake duck (Oxyura vittata)

== New World quail ==
Order: Galliformes Family: Odontophoridae

- California quail (Callipepla californica) (I)

== Pheasants, partridges and allies ==
Order: Galliformes Family: Phasianidae

- Ring-necked pheasant (Phasianus colchicus) (I)

== Flamingos ==
Order: Phoenicopteriformes Family: Phoenicopteridae

- Chilean flamingo (Phoenicopterus chilensis)

== Grebes ==
Order: Podicipediformes Family: Podicipedidae

- White-tufted grebe (Rollandia rolland)
- Pied-billed grebe (Podilymbus podiceps)
- Great grebe (Podiceps major)
- Silvery grebe (Podiceps occipitalis)
- Hooded grebe (Podiceps gallardoi) (A)

== Doves and pigeons ==
Order: Columbiformes Family: Columbidae

- Rock dove (Columba livia) (I)
- Chilean pigeon (Patagioenas araucana)
- Black-winged ground dove (Metriopelia melanoptera)
- Eared dove (Zenaida auriculata)

== Nightjars ==
Order: Caprimulgiformes Family: Caprimulgidae

- Band-winged nightjar (Systellura longirostris)

== Hummingbirds ==
Order: Apodiformes Family: Trochilidae

- Green-backed firecrown (Sephanoides sephaniodes)
- White-sided hillstar (Oreotrochilus leucopleurus)
- Giant hummingbird (Patagona gigas) (A)

== Rails ==
Order: Gruiformes Family: Rallidae

- Austral rail (Rallus antarcticus)
- Spot-flanked gallinule (Porphyriops melanops) (A)
- Red-fronted coot (Fulica rufifrons) (A)
- Red-gartered coot (Fulica armillata)
- White-winged coot (Fulica leucoptera)
- Plumbeous rail (Pardirallus sanguinolentus)

== Stilts and avocets ==
Order: Charadriiformes Family: Recurvirostridae

- Black-necked stilt (Himantopus mexicanus)

== Oystercatchers ==
Order: Charadriiformes Family: Haematopodidae

- American oystercatcher (Haematopus palliatus)
- Blackish oystercatcher (Haematopus ater)
- Magellanic oystercatcher (Haematopus leucopodus)

== Plovers and Lapwings ==
Order: Charadriiformes Family: Charadriidae

- Tawny-throated dotterel (Oreopholus ruficollis)
- Rufous-chested dotterel (Zonibyx modestus)
- Southern lapwing (Vanellus chilensis)
- Two-banded plover (Anarhynchus falklandicus)

== Seedsnipes ==
Order: Charadriiformes Family: Thinocoridae

- Rufous-bellied seedsnipe (Attagis gayi)
- White-bellied seedsnipe (Attagis malouinus)
- Grey-breasted seedsnipe (Thinocorus orbignyianus)
- Least seedsnipe (Thinocorus rumicivorus)

== Sandpipers ==
Order: Charadriiformes Family: Scolopacidae

- Whimbrel (Numenius phaeopus)
- Hudsonian godwit (Limosa haemastica)
- Fuegian snipe (Gallinago stricklandii)
- Magellanic snipe (Gallinago magellanica)
- Wilson's phalarope (Phalaropus tricolor)
- Red phalarope (Phalaropus fulicarius)
- Lesser yellowlegs (Tringa flavipes)
- Greater yellowlegs (Tringa melanoleuca)
- Ruddy turnstone (Arenaria interpres)
- Surfbird (Calidris virgata)
- Sanderling (Calidris alba)
- Baird's sandpiper (Calidris bairdii)
- White-rumped sandpiper (Calidris fuscicollis)
- Pectoral sandpiper (Calidris melanotos)

== Skuas and jaegers ==
Order: Charadriiformes Family: Stercorariidae

- Parasitic jaeger (Stercorarius parasiticus)
- Chilean skua (Stercorarius chilensis)
- Brown skua (Stercorarius antarcticus) (A)

== Gulls, terns, and skimmers ==
Order: Charadriiformes Family: Laridae

- Brown-hooded gull (Chroicocephalus maculipennis)
- Grey gull (Leucophaeus modestus)
- Dolphin gull (Leucophaeus scoresbii)
- Franklin's gull (Leucophaeus pipixcan)
- Kelp gull (Larus dominicanus)
- Inca tern (Larosterna inca)
- Arctic tern (Sterna paradisaea)
- South American tern (Sterna hirundinacea)
- Elegant tern (Thalasseus elegans)

== Penguins ==
Order: Sphenisciformes Family: Spheniscidae

- Humboldt penguin (Spheniscus humboldti)
- Magellanic penguin (Spheniscus magellanicus)
- Macaroni penguin (Eudyptes chrysolophus)
- Southern rockhopper penguin (Eudyptes chrysocome) (A)

== Albatrosses ==
Order: Procellariiformes Family: Diomedeidae

- Northern royal albatross (Diomedea sanfordi)
- Southern royal albatross (Diomedea epomophora)
- Snowy albatross (Diomedea exulans)
- Antipodean albatross (Diomedea antipodensis)
- Grey-headed albatross (Thalassarche chrysostoma)
- Light-mantled albatross (Phoebetria palpebrata)
- Buller's albatross (Thalassarche bulleri)
- Salvin's albatross (Thalassarche salvini)
- Chatham albatross (Thalassarche eremita)
- Black-browed albatross (Thalassarche melanophris)

== Southern storm petrels ==
Order: Procellariiformes Family: Oceanitidae

- Wilson's storm-petrel (Oceanites oceanicus)
- Pincoya storm-petrel (Oceanites pincoyae) (En)
- Grey-backed storm-petrel (Garrodia nereis)
- White-faced storm-petrel (Pelagodroma marina)
- Black-bellied storm-petrel (Fregetta tropica)

== Petrels and shearwaters ==
Order: Procellariiformes Family: Procellariidae

- Southern giant-petrel (Macronectes giganteus)
- Northern giant-petrel (Macronectes halli)
- Southern fulmar (Fulmarus glacialoides)
- Antarctic petrel (Thalassoica antarctica) (A)
- Cape petrel (Daption capense)
- Grey-faced petrel (Pterodroma gouldi) (A)
- Kermadec petrel (Pterodroma neglecta)
- Soft-plumaged petrel (Pterodroma mollis) (A)
- Juan Fernandez petrel (Pterodroma externa) (En)
- Stejneger's petrel (Pterodroma longirostris) (En)
- Blue petrel (Halobaena caerulea)
- Antarctic prion (Pachyptila desolata)
- Slender-billed prion (Pachyptila belcheri)
- Grey petrel (Procellaria cinerea)
- White-chinned petrel (Procellaria aequinoctialis)
- Parkinson's petrel (Procellaria parkinsoni) (A)
- Westland petrel (Procellaria westlandica)
- Pink-footed shearwater (Ardenna creatopus)
- Great shearwater (Ardenna gravis)
- Buller's shearwater (Ardenna bulleri)
- Sooty shearwater (Ardenna grisea)
- Manx shearwater (Puffinus puffinus) (A)
- Subantarctic shearwater (Puffinus elegans)
- Tropical shearwater (Puffinus bailloni)
- Common diving-petrel (Pelecanoides urinatrix)
- Magellanic diving-petrel (Pelecanoides magellani)

== Boobies and gannets ==
Order: Pelecaniformes Family: Sulidae

- Nazca booby (Sula granti) (A)
- Peruvian booby (Sula variegata)

== Cormorants ==
Order: Pelecaniformes Family: Phalacrocoracidae

- Red-legged cormorant (Poikilocarbo gaimardi)
- Neotropic cormorant (Phalacrocorax brasilianum)
- Magellanic cormorant (Leucocarbo magellanicus)
- Imperial cormorant (Leucocarbo atriceps)

== Pelicans ==
Order: Pelecaniformes Family: Pelecanidae

- Peruvian pelican (Pelecanus thagus)

== Herons and egrets ==
Order: Pelecaniformes Family: Ardeidae

- Black-crowned night-heron (Nycticorax nycticorax)
- Snowy egret (Egretta thula)
- Western cattle egret (Bubulcus ibis)
- Great egret (Ardea alba)
- Cocoi heron (Ardea cocoi)

== Ibises and spoonbills ==
Order: Pelecaniformes Family: Threskiornithidae

- White-faced ibis (Plegadis chihi)
- Black-faced ibis (Theristicus melanopis)

== New World vultures ==
Order: Cathartiformes Family: Cathartidae

- Turkey vulture (Cathartes aura)
- Black vulture (Coragyps atratus)
- Andean condor (Vultur gryphus)

== Hawks, kites, and eagles ==
Order: Accipitriformes Family: Accipitridae

- White-tailed kite (Elanus leucurus)
- Cinereous harrier (Circus cinereus)
- Chilean hawk (Astur chilensis)
- Harris's hawk (Parabuteo unicinctus)
- Variable hawk (Geranoaetus polyosoma)
- Black-chested buzzard-eagle (Geranoaetus melanoleucus)
- White-throated hawk (Buteo albigula) (A)
- Rufous-tailed hawk (Buteo ventralis)

== Barn owls ==
Order: Strigiformes Family: Tytonidae

- American barn owl (Tyto furcata)

== Owls ==
Order: Strigiformes Family: Strigidae

- Lesser horned owl (Bubo magellanicus)
- Austral pygmy-owl (Glaucidium nana)
- Rufous-legged owl (Strix rufipes)
- Short-eared owl (Asio flammeus)

== Kingfishers ==
Order: Coraciiformes Family: Alcedinidae

- Ringed kingfisher (Megaceryle torquata)

== Woodpeckers ==
Order: Piciformes Family: Picidae

- Striped woodpecker (Dryobates lignarius)
- Magellanic woodpecker (Campephilus magellanicus)
- Chilean flicker (Colaptes pitius)

== Falcons ==
Order: Falconiformes Family: Falconidae

- Crested caracara (Caracara plancus)
- Chimango caracara (Daptrius chimango)
- White-throated caracara (Daptrius albogularis)
- Striated caracara (Daptrius australis)
- American kestrel (Falco sparverius)
- Aplomado falcon (Falco femoralis)
- Peregrine falcon (Falco peregrinus)

== Parrots ==
Order: Psittaciformes Family: Psittacidae

- Austral parakeet (Enicognathus ferrugineus)
- Slender-billed parakeet (Enicognathus leptorhynchus) (En)

== Tapaculos ==
Order: Passeriformes Family: Rhinocryptidae

- Black-throated huet-huet (Pteroptochos tarnii)
- Chucao tapaculo (Scelorchilus rubecula)
- Ochre-flanked tapaculo (Eugralla paradoxa)
- Magellanic tapaculo (Scytalopus magellanicus)

== Ovenbirds ==
Order: Passeriformes Family: Furnariidae

- Common miner (Geositta cunicularia)
- Rufous-banded miner (Geositta rufipennis)
- Short-billed miner (Geositta antarctica)
- White-throated treerunner (Pygarrhichas albogularis)
- Band-tailed earthcreeper (Ochetorhynchus phoenicurus)
- Wren-like rushbird (Phleocryptes melanops)
- Patagonian forest earthcreeper (Upucerthia saturatior)
- Scale-throated earthcreeper (Upucerthia dumetaria)
- Buff-winged cinclodes (Cinclodes fuscus)
- Blackish cinclodes (Cinclodes antarcticus)
- Grey-flanked cinclodes (Cinclodes oustaleti)
- Dark-bellied cinclodes (Cinclodes patagonicus)
- Thorn-tailed rayadito (Aphrastura spinicauda)
- Des Murs's wiretail (Sylviorthorhynchus desmursii)
- Plain-mantled tit-spinetail (Leptasthenura aegithaloides)
- Austral canastero (Asthenes anthoides)
- Cordilleran canastero (Asthenes modesta)
- Sharp-billed canastero (Asthenes pyrrholeuca)

== Cotingas ==
Order: Passeriformes Family: Cotingidae

- Rufous-tailed plantcutter (Phytotoma rara)

== Tyrant flycatchers ==
Order: Passeriformes Family: Tyrannidae

- Many-coloured rush-tyrant (Tachuris rubrigastra)
- Tufted tit-tyrant (Anairetes parulus)
- White-crested elaenia (Elaenia albiceps)
- Austral negrito (Lessonia rufa)
- Spectacled tyrant (Hymenops perspicillatus)
- Spot-billed ground-tyrant (Muscisaxicola maculirostris)
- Ochre-naped ground-tyrant (Muscisaxicola flavinucha)
- Dark-faced ground-tyrant (Muscisaxicola maclovianus)
- White-browed ground-tyrant (Muscisaxicola albilora)
- Cinnamon-bellied ground-tyrant (Muscisaxicola capistratus)
- Fire-eyed diucon (Pyrope pyrope)
- Chocolate-vented tyrant (Neoxolmis rufiventris)
- Black-billed shrike-tyrant (Agriornis montanus)
- Great shrike-tyrant (Agriornis lividus)
- Grey-bellied shrike-tyrant (Agriornis micropterus)
- Patagonian tyrant (Colorhamphus parvirostris)

== Swallows and martins ==
Order: Passeriformes Family: Hirundinidae

- Bank swallow (Riparia riparia) (A)
- Chilean swallow (Tachycineta leucopyga)
- Southern martin (Progne elegans) (A)
- Blue-and-white swallow (Pygochelidon cyanoleuca)
- Barn swallow (Hirundo rustica)
- Cliff swallow (Petrochelidon pyrrhonota)

== Wrens ==
Order: Passeriformes Family: Troglodytidae

- Southern house wren (Troglodytes musculus)
- Grass wren (Cistothorus platensis)

== Mockingbirds, thrashers, and allies ==
Order: Passeriformes Family: Mimidae

- Patagonian mockingbird (Mimus patagonicus)
- Chalk-browed mockingbird (Mimus saturninus) (A)
- White-banded mockingbird (Mimus triurus) (A)

== Thrushes ==
Order: Passeriformes Family: Turdidae

- Austral thrush (Turdus falcklandii)

== Old World sparrows ==
Order: Passeriformes Family: Passeridae

- House sparrow (Passer domesticus) (I)

== Pipits ==
Order: Passeriformes Family: Motacillidae

- Correndera pipit (Anthus correndera)
- Hellmayr's pipit (Anthus hellmayri)

== Finches ==
Order: Passeriformes Family: Fringillidae

- Black-chinned siskin (Spinus barbatus)

== New World sparrows ==
Order: Passeriformes Family: Passerellidae

- Rufous-collared sparrow (Zonotrichia capensis)

== Icterids ==
Order: Passeriformes Family: Icteridae

- Long-tailed meadowlark (Leistes loyca)
- Shiny cowbird (Molothrus bonariensis)
- Austral blackbird (Curaeus curaeus)
- Yellow-winged blackbird (Agelasticus thilius)

== South American tanagers ==
Order: Passeriformes Family: Thraupidae

- Sayaca tanager (Thraupis sayaca) (A)
- Grey-hooded sierra finch (Phrygilus gayi)
- Patagonian sierra finch (Phrygilus patagonicus)
- Diuca finch (Diuca diuca)
- Yellow-bridled finch (Melanodera xanthogramma)
- Plumbeous sierra finch (Geospizopsis unicolor)
- Mourning sierra finch (Rhopospina fruticeti)
- Greater yellow-finch (Sicalis auriventris)
- Grassland yellow-finch (Sicalis luteola)
