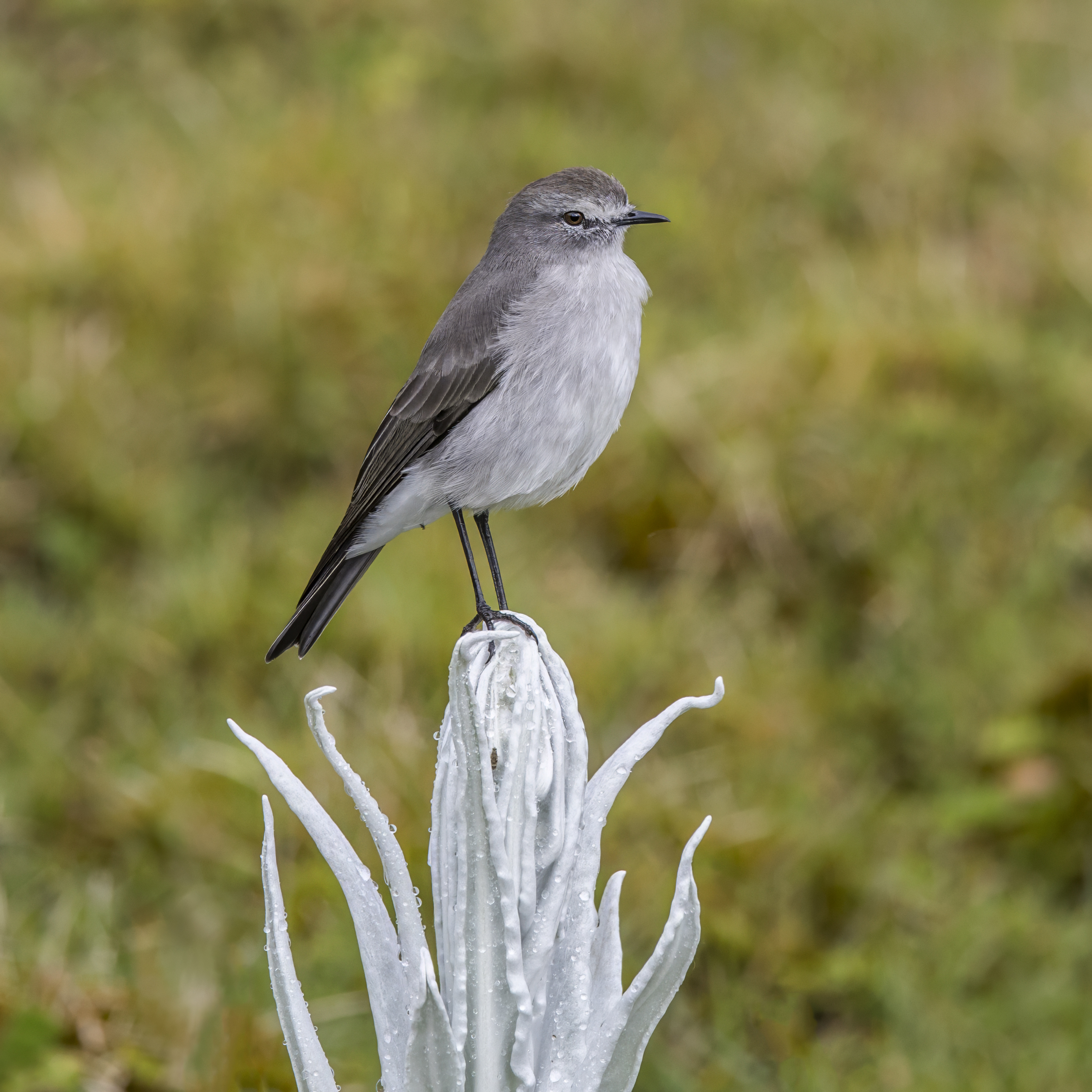
- Chingaza National Natural Park, Colombia on Senecio niveo-aureus

Conservation status
- Least Concern (IUCN 3.1)

Scientific classification
- Kingdom: Animalia
- Phylum: Chordata
- Class: Aves
- Order: Passeriformes
- Family: Tyrannidae
- Genus: Muscisaxicola
- Species: M. alpinus

Binomial name
- Muscisaxicola alpinus (Jardine, 1849)

Synonyms
- Muscisaxicola alpina (Jardine, 1849) [orthographic error]

= Paramo ground tyrant =

Species of bird

The paramo ground tyrant (Muscisaxicola alpinus), more widely known as the plain-capped ground-tyrant, is a species of bird in the family Tyrannidae, the tyrant flycatchers. It is found in Colombia, Ecuador, and possibly Peru.

== Taxonomy and systematics ==
The paramo ground tyrant was originally described in 1849 as Taenioptera alpina. It was eventually moved to genus Muscisaxicola that had been erected in 1837. Until the 2020 publication of a molecular phylogenetic study it had been widely treated as conspecific with the cinereous ground tyrant (M. cinereus) and Taczanowski's ground tyrant (M. griseus). Of the major taxonomic systems, only the IOC calls it the "paramo ground tyrant"; Wikipedia generally follows IOC nomenclature. The South American Classification Committee of the American Ornithological Society (SACC), the Clements taxonomy, and BirdLife International's Handbook of the Birds of the World call it the "plain-capped ground-tyrant".

The paramo ground tyrant has three subspecies, the nominate M. a. alpinus (Jardine, 1849), M. a. columbianus (Chapman, 1912), and M. a. quesadae (Meyer de Schauensee, 1942).

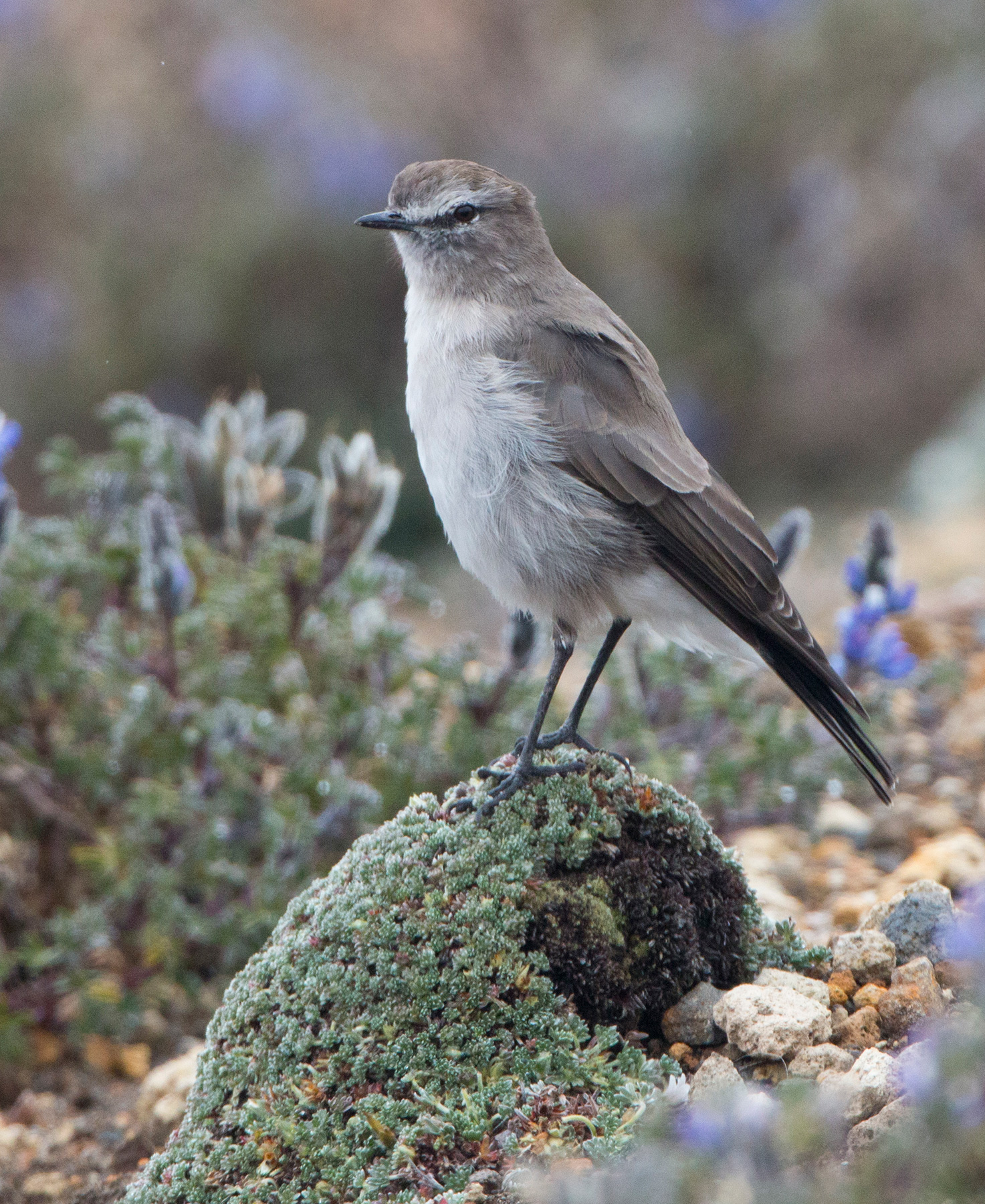
In Ecuador

== Description ==
The paramo ground tyrant is 18 to 20 cm (7.1 to 7.9 in) long. The sexes have the same plumage. Adults of the nominate subspecies have a sepia-brown crown, dusky lores, a wide white supercilium that extends past the eye, and a small white patch below the eye. Their nape and back are grayish brown. Their wings are a duskier grayish brown with some pale edges on the coverts. Their tail is blackish with thin white edges on the outermost feathers. Their underparts are grayish white that is darker on the breast than on the throat and belly. They have a dark brown iris, a shortish black bill, and black legs and feet. Juveniles have cinnamon tips on the wing coverts and thin cinnamon edges on the inner remiges. Their belly and vent have a buff tinge with whitish streaks. Subspecies M. a. columbianus is almost identical to the nominate but has slightly darker upperparts. M. a. quesadae has the same plumage as the nominate but is slightly smaller.

== Distribution and habitat ==
The paramo ground tyrant is a bird of the northern high Andes and has a disjunct distribution. Subspecies M. a. columbianus is found in Colombia's Central Andes between Caldas and Cauca departments. M. a. quesadae is found in Colombia's Eastern Andes of Boyacá, Santander, and Cundinamarca departments. The nominate subspecies is found from Nariño Department in extreme southwestern Colombia south on both slopes of the Andes through Ecuador to Azuay Province. There are also sight records in northern Peru that might be of this species; the SACC calls it hypothetical in that country.

The paramo ground tyrant inhabits puna and páramo grasslands, often in rocky areas, and arid montane scrub. In elevation it ranges between 3,200 and 4,400 m (10,500 and 14,400 ft) in Colombia and mostly between 3,800 and 4,600 m (12,500 and 15,100 ft) in Ecuador. The sight records in Peru were between 2,900 and 3,350 m (9,500 and 11,000 ft).

== Behavior ==
=== Movement ===
The paramo ground tyrant is a year-round resident.

=== Feeding ===
The paramo ground tyrant feeds on insects. It usually forages by itself in the breeding season; outside that it often is in small flocks that may include other species. It is almost wholly terrestrial; it will perch on rocks or a wall, though less often than some other ground tyrants. It runs and hops along the ground, stopping to stand erect before grabbing prey, or makes a short sally to the ground from a low perch.

=== Breeding ===
The paramo ground tyrant breeds between September and December in Colombia and August to October and possibly beyond in Ecuador. Males make a display flight in which they hover and then drop to the ground. The species' nest is a cup of grass and roots with minimal lining and typically is placed in a crevice or hole under a rock. The clutch is four eggs that are white with cinnamon flecks. Nothing else is known about the species' breeding biology.

=== Vocalization ===
As of April 2025 xeno-canto had 10 recordings of ochre-naped ground tyrant vocalizations. The Cornell Lab of Ornithology's Macaulay Library had only three, all of which are also on xeno-canto. The species is "[g]enerally quiet, though [it] occasionally gives a soft tik note".

== Status ==
The IUCN has assessed the paramo ground tyrant as being of Least Concern. Its population size is not known and is believed to be stable. No immediate threats have been identified. It is considered "local but abundant where present" in Colombia and "fairly common" in Ecuador. It occurs in national parks and other protected areas in both countries.
