= Taczanowski's ground tyrant =

Conservation status
- Least Concern (IUCN 3.1)

Scientific classification
- Kingdom: Animalia
- Phylum: Chordata
- Class: Aves
- Order: Passeriformes
- Family: Tyrannidae
- Genus: Muscisaxicola
- Species: M. griseus

Binomial name
- Muscisaxicola griseus Taczanowski, 1884

Species of bird

Taczanowski's ground tyrant (Muscisaxicola griseus) is a species of bird in the family Tyrannidae, the tyrant flycatchers. It is found in Bolivia and Peru.

== Taxonomy and systematics ==
Taczanowski's ground tyrant was for a time treated as a subspecies of M. alpinus, which most taxonomists called the "plain-capped ground-tyrant". They were separated following a study published in 2020 and confusingly M. griseus was then called "plain-capped" and M. alpinus the "paramo" ground tyrants by some systems. Soon thereafter M. griseus gained its current English name of Taczanowski's ground tyrant. Of the major taxonomic systems, only the IOC now calls M. alpinus the "paramo ground tyrant". The South American Classification Committee of the American Ornithological Society (SACC), the Clements taxonomy, and BirdLife International's Handbook of the Birds of the World again call M. alpinus the "plain-capped ground-tyrant".

Taczanowski's ground tyrant is monotypic.

== Description ==
Taczanowski's ground tyrant is 16.5 to 19 cm (6.5 to 7.5 in) long. The sexes have the same plumage. Adults have a brownish gray crown, dusky lores, a long white supercilium that extends past the eye, and a small white patch below the eye. Their nape and back are smoky gray. Their wings are a duskier smoky gray with some pale edges on the coverts. Their tail is blackish with thin white edges on the outermost feathers. Their throat is white, their breast gray, and their belly white with a buff tinge. They have a dark iris, a black bill, and black legs and feet.

== Distribution and habitat ==
Taczanowski's ground tyrant is found from Cajamarca Department in northern Peru south along the Andes into northwestern and central Bolivia's La Paz and Cochabamba departments. It inhabits puna and páramo grasslands and to a lesser degree dry areas with sparse vegetation. In elevation it ranges between 3,200 and 4,800 m (10,500 and 15,700 ft) in Peru but down to 2,700 m (8,900 ft) in Bolivia.

== Behavior ==
=== Movement ===
Taczanowski's ground tyrant is a year-round resident.

=== Feeding ===
Taczanowski's ground tyrant feeds on insects. It usually forages by itself in the breeding season; outside that it often is in small flocks that may include other species. It is almost wholly terrestrial; it will perch on rocks or a wall, though less often than some other ground tyrants. It runs and hops along the ground, stopping to stand erect before grabbing prey, or makes a short sally to the ground from a low perch.

=== Breeding ===
The breeding season of Taczanowski's ground tyrant includes December and January. Nothing else is known about the species' breeding biology.

=== Vocalization ===
As of April 2025 xeno-canto had only one recording of a Taczanowski's ground tyrant vocalization and the Cornell Lab of Ornithology's Macaulay Library had none. Its song has not been described; its call is "a soft pip repeated at intervals".

== Status ==
The IUCN has assessed Taczanowski's ground tyrant as being of Least Concern. Its population size is not known and is believed to be stable. No immediate threats have been identified. It is considered "fairly common and widespread" in Peru.
