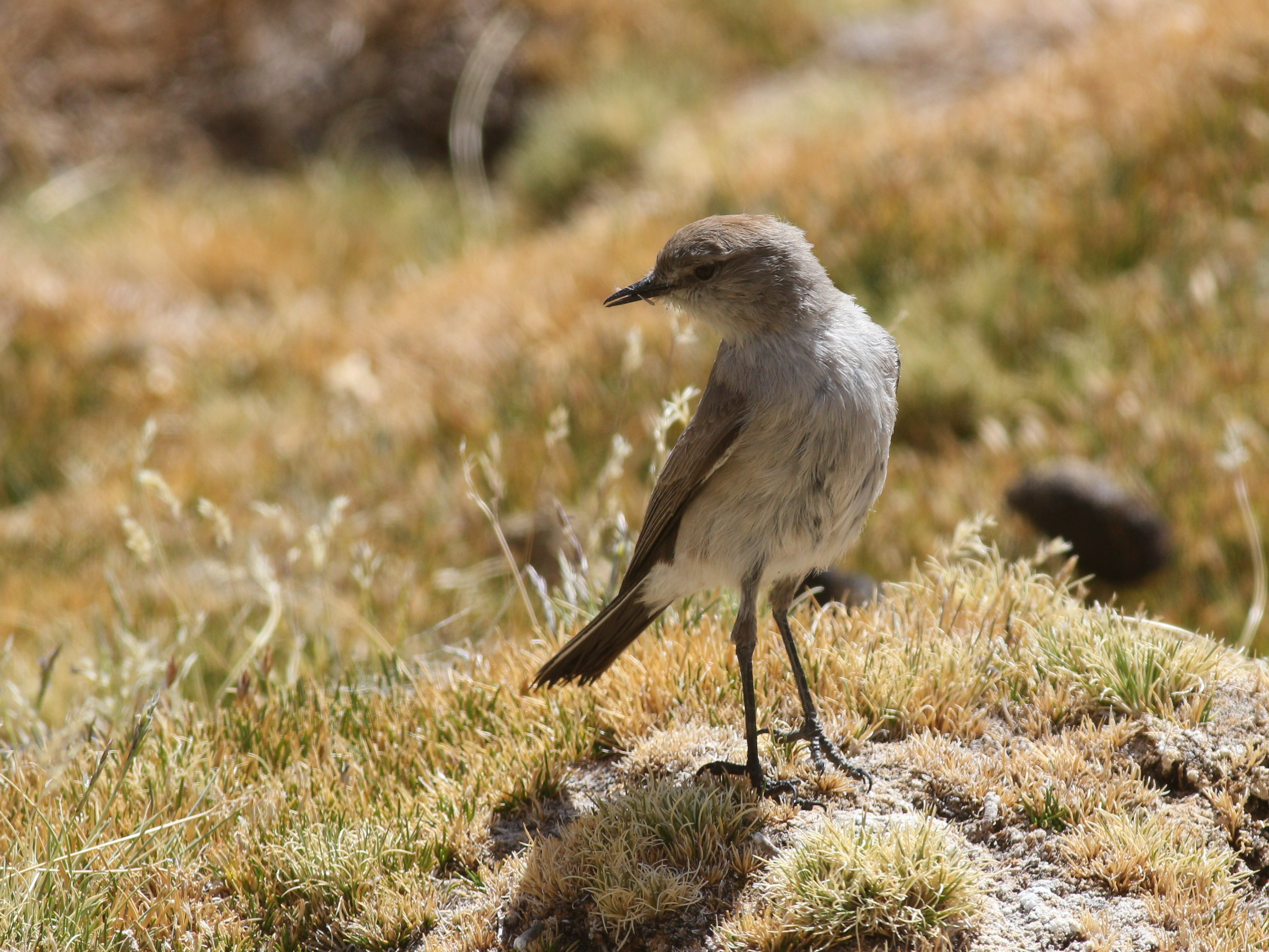

Conservation status
- Least Concern (IUCN 3.1)

Scientific classification
- Kingdom: Animalia
- Phylum: Chordata
- Class: Aves
- Order: Passeriformes
- Family: Tyrannidae
- Genus: Muscisaxicola
- Species: M. juninensis

Binomial name
- Muscisaxicola juninensis Taczanowski, 1884

= Puna ground tyrant =

Species of bird

The puna ground tyrant (Muscisaxicola juninensis) is a species of bird in the family Tyrannidae, the tyrant flycatchers. It is found in Argentina, Bolivia, Chile, and Peru.

== Taxonomy and systematics ==
The puna ground-tyrant is monotypic.

The authors of an early twentieth century publication suggested possibly treating M. juninensis (then called the Junin ground-tyrant) as a subspecies of the white-browed ground tyrant (M. albilora).

== Description ==
The puna ground tyrant is 16 to 16.5 cm (6.3 to 6.5 in) long. The sexes have the same plumage. Adults have a dull cinnamon crown, a white spot above their lores, a faint pale supercilium, and a pale broken eye-ring on an otherwise pale brownish gray face. Their upperparts are mostly pale brownish gray with a black lower rump. Their wings are dusky gray. Their tail is black with white edges on the outer webs of the outermost feathers. Their throat and belly are whitish and their breast pale gray. They have a dark iris, a black bill, and black legs and feet. Juveniles have pale cinnamon edges on the wing coverts and buffy underparts.

== Distribution and habitat ==
The puna ground tyrant is found along the Andes from Ancash Department in northwestern Peru south through the country into northern Chile's Arica and Tarapacá regions and through western Bolivia into northwestern Argentina as far as western Tucumán Province. It inhabits puna grassland and montane steppe, especially near rock outcrops, boulders, and cliffs. It also inhabits the edges of bogs, lakes, and marshes. In elevation it overall ranges between 3,200 and 5,000 m (10,500 and 16,400 ft) but between 3,800 and 4,800 m (12,500 and 15,700 ft) in Peru.

== Behavior ==
=== Movement ===
The puna ground tyrant is mostly a year-round resident but will seek lower elevations during very bad weather.

=== Feeding ===
The puna ground tyrant feeds on insects. It is almost wholly terrestrial but will perch on rocks. It runs and hops along the ground, stopping to stand erect before grabbing prey, or sallies to it from a rock. In the breeding season it mostly forages by itself or in pairs but is regularly in flocks outside that season.

=== Breeding ===
The puna ground tyrant's breeding season has not been defined but includes October. Its nest has not been formally described but it is thought to be placed in a crevice between rocks. Nothing else is known about the species' breeding biology.

=== Vocalization ===
As of April 2025 xeno-canto had a single recording of a puna ground tyrant vocalization and the Cornell Lab of Ornithology's Macaulay Library had five others. The species' song is not known. Its call is "a soft high-pitched peep repeated at intervals".

== Status ==
The IUCN has assessed the puna ground tyrant as being of Least Concern. It has a large range; its population size is not known and is believed to be stable. No immediate threats have been identified. It is considered fairly common in Peru and locally fairly common to common overall. It occurs in national parks in all four countries it inhabits.
