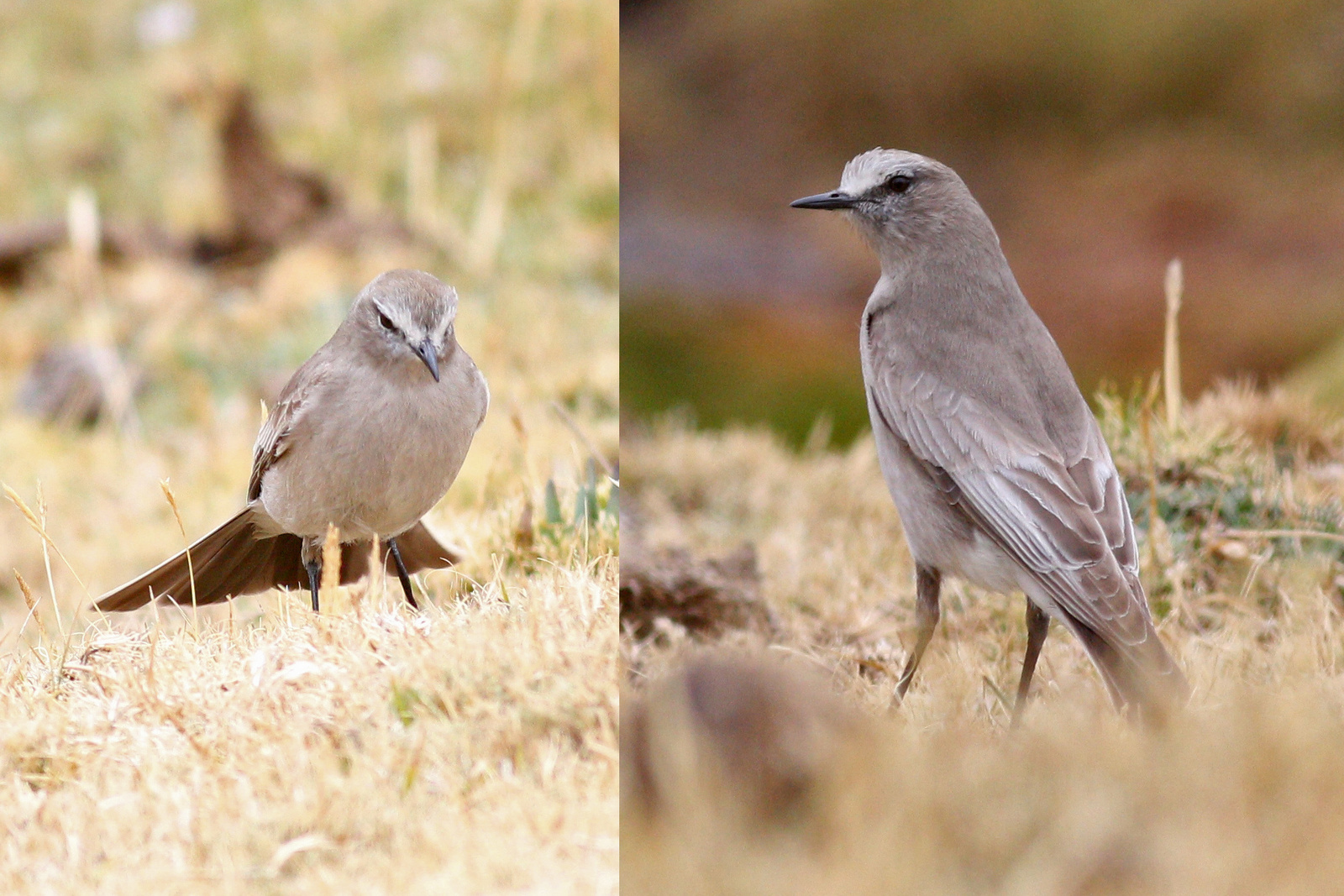

Conservation status
- Least Concern (IUCN 3.1)

Scientific classification
- Kingdom: Animalia
- Phylum: Chordata
- Class: Aves
- Order: Passeriformes
- Family: Tyrannidae
- Genus: Muscisaxicola
- Species: M. albifrons

Binomial name
- Muscisaxicola albifrons (Tschudi, 1844)

Synonyms
- Ptyonura albifrons (protonym)

= White-fronted ground tyrant =

Species of bird

The white-fronted ground tyrant (Muscisaxicola albifrons) is a species of bird in the tyrant flycatcher family Tyrannidae. It is found in Bolivia, Chile, and Peru.

== Taxonomy and systematics ==
The white-fronted ground tyrant was originally described as Ptyonura albifrons. Genus Muscisaxicola had been erected in 1837 and the species was moved to it in 1921.

The white-fronted ground tyrant is monotypic.

== Description ==
The white-fronted ground tyrant is the largest member of its genus at 21.5 to 24 cm (8.5 to 9.4 in) long. The sexes have the same plumage. Adults have a white forehead ("front") that extends rearward in a "vee" above the eyes and a warm grayish brown crown on an otherwise blackish face. Their nape and back are brownish gray. Their wings are dark brown with wide white edges on the secondaries that show as a panel on the wing. Their tail is dark brown with grayish white edges on the outer feathers. Their throat, breast, and belly are pale gray with faint darker markings and their undertail coverts white. They have a brown iris, a black bill, and black legs and feet. Juveniles have less white on the forehead than adults, with cinnamon edges on the wing coverts, buff edges on the primaries and secondaries, and drab gray edges on the outer tail feathers.

== Distribution and habitat ==
The white-fronted ground tyrant is found in the Andes from the Department of Ancash in north-central Peru south through the extreme northern tip of Chile into western Bolivia's La Paz Department. It primarily inhabits wetlands with cushion plants called bofedales and also nearby drier areas. In elevation it occurs above 3,700 m (12,100 ft), reaching 5,200 m (17,100 ft) in Peru and 5,600 m (18,400 ft) in Chile. It has been found roosting in glacier crevasses and nesting in ice caves.

== Behavior ==
=== Movement ===
The white-fronted ground tyrant is a year-round resident.

=== Feeding ===
The white-fronted ground tyrant's diet and foraging behavior have not been detailed. Its diet is assumed to be arthropods and other invertebrates. It appears to forage mostly on the ground with short runs between prey captures.

=== Breeding ===
The white-fronted ground tyrant's breeding season has not been defined. Two juveniles were collected from Bolivia in the mid-twentieth century. The only known nest was found in October in Peru; it contained two nestlings. That nest was in a cavity on the ice at the edge of the Quelccaya Glacier in southern Peru's Cordillera Vilcanota. The researchers were not able to describe the nest at the time of discovery because it was deep in the cavity. Later visits to the site found what they believe to be nest remains consisting of small dark rootlets and much mammal hair thought to be that of vicuña (Lama vicugna).

=== Vocalization ===
As of April 2025 xeno-canto had only one recording each of the white-fronted ground tyrant's song and call. The Cornell Lab of Ornithology's Macaulay Library had the same call recording and five others also of calls. The song has not been described; the call is described as "a soft series of notes tip-tip-tip...".

== Status ==
The IUCN has assessed the white-fronted ground tyrant as being of Least Concern. Its population size is not known and is believed to be stable. No immediate threats have been identified. It is considered uncommon to fairly common in Peru. "Despite being relatively common in a remote region, this species may be harmed by human impacts. Bofedales, which appear to be an important habitat for this species, are threatened by mining, overgrazing, and climate change (via changes in hydrology)."
