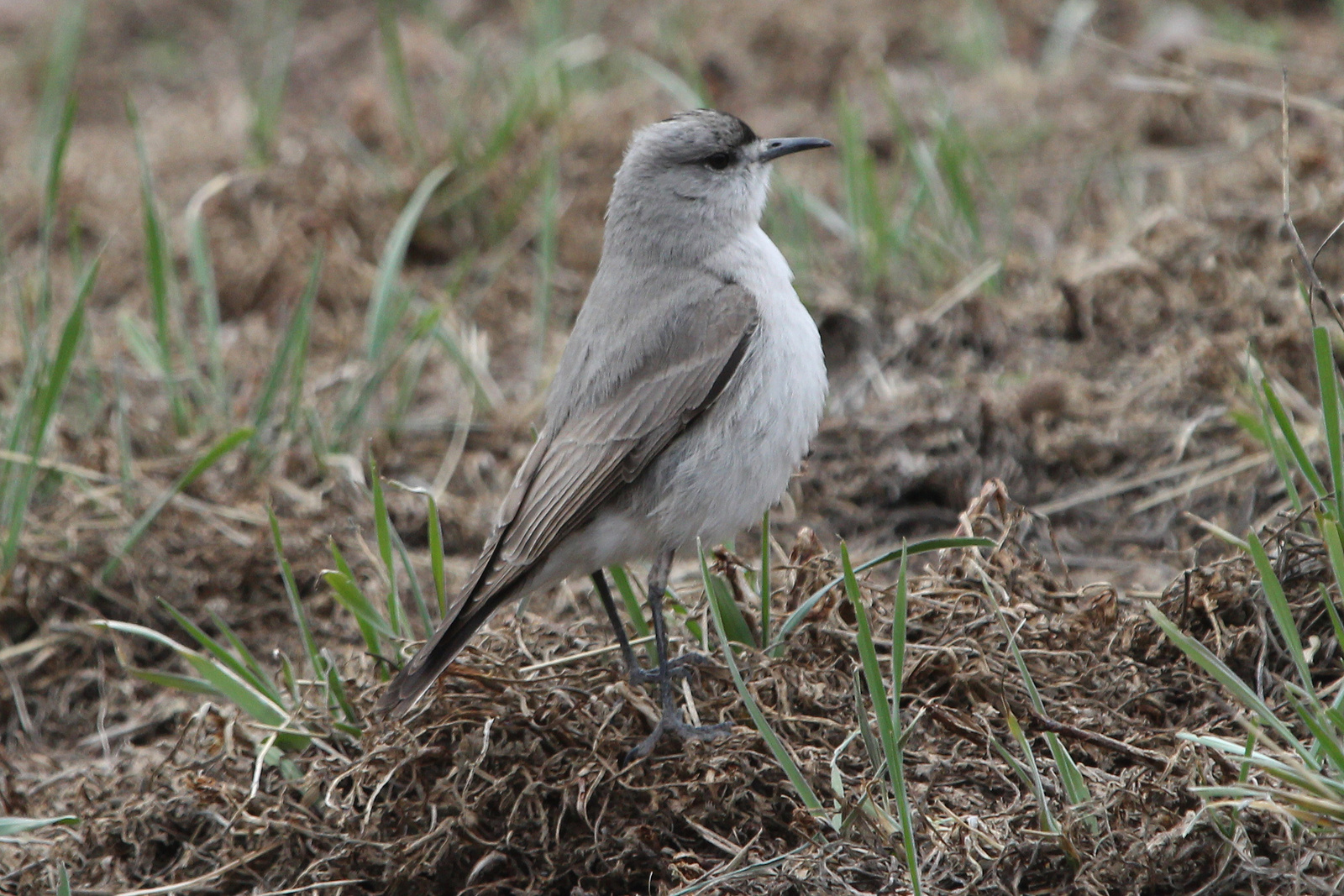

Conservation status
- Least Concern (IUCN 3.1)

Scientific classification
- Kingdom: Animalia
- Phylum: Chordata
- Class: Aves
- Order: Passeriformes
- Family: Tyrannidae
- Genus: Muscisaxicola
- Species: M. frontalis

Binomial name
- Muscisaxicola frontalis (Burmeister, 1860)
- Breeding Non-Breeding

= Black-fronted ground tyrant =

Species of bird

The black-fronted ground tyrant (Muscisaxicola frontalis) is a species of bird in the family Tyrannidae, the tyrant flycatchers. It is found in Argentina, Bolivia, Chile, and Peru.

== Taxonomy and systematics ==
The black-fronted ground-tyrant was originally described as Ptyonura frontalis. It was eventually moved to genus Muscisaxicola that had been erected in 1837.

The black-fronted ground-tyrant is monotypic.

== Description ==
The black-fronted ground tyrant is 16.5 to 19 cm (6.5 to 7.5 in) long. The sexes have the same plumage. Adults have a black forecrown ("front"), a blackish chestnut hindcrown, conspicuous white lores, and a pale broken eye-ring on an otherwise ashy gray face. Their upperparts are ashy gray. Their wings are a duskier gray. Their tail is black with whitish outer webs of the outermost feathers. Their throat and underparts are pale gray-white. They have a dark brown iris, a slim black bill with a decurved tip, and black legs and feet. Juveniles have a sooty forecrown and pale buff edges on the wing coverts.

== Distribution and habitat ==
The black-fronted ground tyrant is a bird of the Andes. It is found in Peru primarily in Arequipa and Puno departments and very rarely as far north as Ancash Department. Its range continues south through western Bolivia, along eastern Chile to the Maule Region, and along western Argentina to western Río Negro Province. It inhabits puna grassland and sparsely vegetated stony hillsides and often favors areas near water features such as bogs and marshes. In elevation it ranges overall mostly between 2,500 and 4,300 m (8,200 and 14,100 ft) but is known as low as 1,800 m (5,900 ft). In Peru it is known between 3,750 and 4,300 m (12,300 and 14,100 ft).

== Behavior ==
=== Movement ===
The black-fronted ground tyrant is a complete migrant. It breeds in Chile from the Atacama Region south and in Argentina from San Juan Province south. For the April to September austral winter it moves north from there to northern Chile, northwestern Argentina, western Bolivia, and southern Peru (and very rarely further north).

=== Feeding ===
The black-fronted ground tyrant feeds primarily on insects but apparently also includes the fruits of Cumulopuntia boliviana cactus in Peru. It is almost wholly terrestrial but will perch on rocks. It runs and hops along the ground, stopping to stand erect before grabbing prey, or sallies to it from a rock. It mostly forages by itself.

=== Breeding ===
The black-fronted ground tyrant breeds between October and March. Its only known nest was in a crevice between rocks and contained two chicks. Noting else is known about the species' breeding biology.

=== Vocalization ===
As of April 2025 xeno-canto had a single recording of a black-fronted ground tyrant vocalization and the Cornell Lab of Ornithology's Macaulay Library had 11 others. Its song is not known; its calls are "a soft tink and treet".

== Status ==
The IUCN has assessed the black-fronted ground tyrant as being of Least Concern. It has a large range; its population size is not known and is believed to be stable. No immediate threats have been identified. It is considered overall rare to uncommon though locally more common. In Peru it is a "rare austral migrant".
