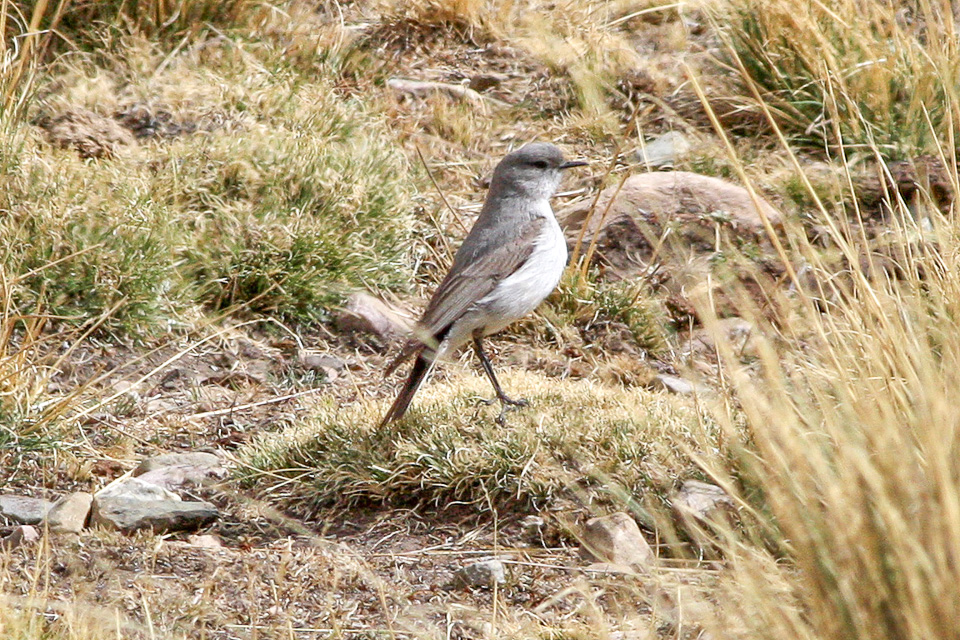

Conservation status
- Least Concern (IUCN 3.1)

Scientific classification
- Kingdom: Animalia
- Phylum: Chordata
- Class: Aves
- Order: Passeriformes
- Family: Tyrannidae
- Genus: Muscisaxicola
- Species: M. cinereus

Binomial name
- Muscisaxicola cinereus Philippi & Landbeck, 1864
- Year-round Non-Breeding

= Cinereous ground tyrant =

Species of bird

The cinereous ground tyrant (Muscisaxicola cinereus) is a species of bird in the family Tyrannidae, the tyrant flycatchers. It is found in Argentina, Bolivia, Chile, and Peru.

== Taxonomy and systematics ==
The cinereous ground tyrant was originally described as Muscisaxicola cinerea. It was later determined that Muscisaxicola is masculine so the specific epithet's case was changed to conform to binomial nomenclature. Between the early and mid-twentieth century many authors treated the cinereous ground tyrant as a subspecies of Muscisaxicola alpinus, now called the paramo ground tyrant or plain-capped ground-tyrant by different taxonomic systems.

The cinereous ground tyrant has two subspecies, the nominate M. c. cinereous (Philippi & Landbeck, 1864) and M. c. argentinus (Hellmayr, 1932). At least one publication suggests that M. c. argentinus should be transferred to M. alpinus.

== Description ==
The cinereous ground tyrant is 15.5 to 16.5 cm (6.1 to 6.5 in) long. The two subspecies and the sexes have the same shades of gray plumage ("cinereous" means ash-colored). Subspecies M. c. argentinus is slighter larger than the nominate. Adults have a grayish brown crown, dusky lores, and a thin white supercilium to above the eye. Their nape and back are grayish brown. Their wings are a duskier grayish brown with some paler edges on the coverts. Their tail is blackish with thin white edges on the outermost feathers. Their underparts are mostly grayish white with a somewhat whiter belly. They have a dark brown iris, a black bill, and black legs and feet.

== Distribution and habitat ==
The cinereous ground tyrant is found from Pasco and northern Lima departments in central Peru south through western Bolivia and northwestern Argentina to the Maule Region in central Chile. Within that range subspecies M. c. argentinus is found in Argentina between Jujuy and Catamarca provinces. It primarily inhabits puna grassland and also montane scrublands and rocky pastures near water. In the non-breeding season it favors dry rocky areas. In elevation it overall ranges between 2,500 and 5,000 m (8,200 and 16,400 ft) though only 4,000 to 4,700 m (13,100 to 15,400 ft) in Peru.

== Behavior ==
=== Movement ===
The cinereous ground tyrant is a partial migrant. Some which breed in the more southerly parts of the species' range migrate north for the austral winter, though the breeding range is not vacated. It is found in Peru only as a winter migrant.

=== Feeding ===
The cinereous ground tyrant feeds on insects. It is almost wholly terrestrial; it will perch on rocks or a wall. It runs and hops along the ground, stopping to stand erect before grabbing prey, or less frequently makes a short sally to the ground from a low perch.

=== Breeding ===
The cinereous ground tyrant breeds between September and March. Its nest is an open cup made from grass and lined with feathers and mammal hair, typically placed in a crevice between rocks. The clutch is two eggs. Nothing else is known about the species' breeding biology.

=== Vocalization ===
As of April 2025 xeno-canto had only one recording of a cinereous ground tyrant vocalization; the Cornell Lab of Ornithology's Macaulay Library had seven including the xeno-canto one. Its song has not been described; its call is "a soft pip repeated at intervals".

== Status ==
The IUCN has assessed the cinereous ground tyrant as being of Least Concern. It has a large range; its population size is not known and is believed to be stable. No immediate threats have been identified. It is considered uncommon to fairly common overall (uncommon in Peru) and occurs in protected areas in Bolivia and Peru.
