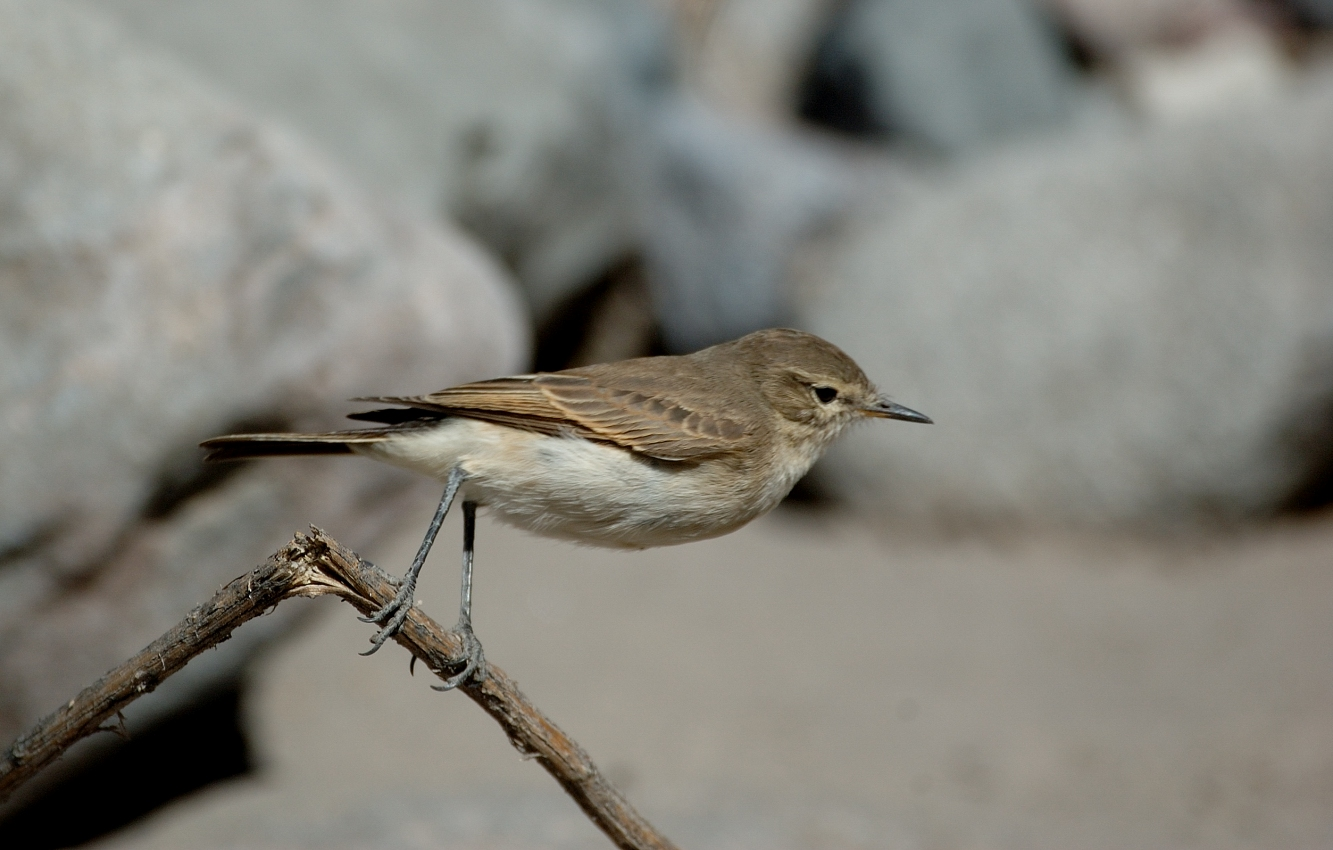
- Spot-billed ground tyrant (Muscisaxicola maculirostris)

Scientific classification
- Kingdom: Animalia
- Phylum: Chordata
- Class: Aves
- Order: Passeriformes
- Family: Tyrannidae
- Genus: Muscisaxicola d'Orbigny & Lafresnaye, 1837

Type species
- Muscisaxicola rufivertex d'Orbigny & Lafresnaye, 1837

= Ground tyrant =

Ground tyrants

Genus of birds

The ground tyrants (Muscisaxicola) are a genus of passerine birds belonging to the tyrant flycatcher family Tyrannidae. There are about 13 different species. They are ground-dwelling birds which inhabit open country in South America, particularly the Andes and Patagonia. Several southern species are migratory, moving northward for the winter. Ground tyrants feed on insects and other invertebrates, mainly by picking them from the ground.

A flight display is performed during the breeding season. The nest is a cup of twigs or grass which, in most species, is built in a burrow, crevice or under rocks.

Ground tyrants are fairly small (13–20 cm in length) with longish legs, a slender bill and an erect posture. The plumage is dull and mainly grey or brown with paler underparts. The head is variably patterned with several species having rufous patches on the crown or white between the bill and eye. The birds have simple calls and are often silent.

== Taxonomy ==
The genus Muscisaxicola was introduced in 1837 by the French naturalists Alcide d'Orbigny and Frédéric de Lafresnaye. They listed several species in their new genus but did not specify a type species. In 1840 the English zoologist George Gray selected Muscisaxicola rufivertex Orbigny & Lafresnaye, the rufous-naped ground tyrant, as the type. The genus name is a portmanteau of the genera Muscicapa and Saxicola.

A molecular phylogenetic study of the suboscines published in 2020 found that the yellow-browed tyrant in the monotypic genus Satrapa was sister to the species in the genus Muscisaxicola.

A study of mitochondrial DNA by Terry Chesser published in 2000 found that the little ground tyrant (M. fluviatilis) is highly divergent and not closely related to the other ground tyrants. All the remaining species are related and form a monophyletic group, although the spot-billed ground tyrant (M. maculirostris) is somewhat divergent from the others. The little and spot-billed ground tyrants are smaller and browner than the other species and the little ground tyrant also differs in its habitat, occurring near rivers in the Amazon rainforest.

The paramo ground tyrant (M. alpinus) and Taczanowski's ground tyrant (M. griseus) were previously treated as a single species but are genetically divergent with the paramo ground tyrant belonging to a southern Andean and Patagonian clade within the genus and Taczanowski's ground tyrant belonging to a central Andean clade. The name plain-capped ground tyrant is used by some authors to refer to M. griseus with paramo ground tyrant used for M. alpinus.

The genus name Muscisaxicola is masculine, therefore the species names griseus, cinereus, maclovianus, alpinus and capistratus are correct rather than grisea, cinerea, macloviana, alpina and capistrata. The names flavinucha and albilora are invariable.

=== Species list ===
The genus contains 12 species:

Image	Scientific name	Common name	Distribution
	Spot-billed ground tyrant	Muscisaxicola maculirostris	Andes
	White-fronted ground tyrant	Muscisaxicola albifrons	Puna grassland
	Ochre-naped ground tyrant	Muscisaxicola flavinucha	southern Andes; winters to northern Peru
	Paramo ground tyrant	Muscisaxicola alpinus	Andes of Colombia and Ecuador
	Taczanowski's ground tyrant	Muscisaxicola griseus	Puna grassland
	Cinereous ground tyrant	Muscisaxicola cinereus	Puna grassland
	Rufous-naped ground tyrant	Muscisaxicola rufivertex	Puna grassland, southern Andes and Sierras Pampeanas
	Dark-faced ground tyrant	Muscisaxicola maclovianus	southern Andes; winters to coastal Peru and throughout Southern Cone
	White-browed ground tyrant	Muscisaxicola albilora	southern Andes; winters north to Ecuador
	Cinnamon-bellied ground tyrant	Muscisaxicola capistratus	southern Patagonia; winters north to southeastern Peru
	Puna ground tyrant	Muscisaxicola juninensis	Puna grassland
	Black-fronted ground tyrant	Muscisaxicola frontalis	southern Andes; winters in Puna grassland

The little ground tyrant was formerly placed in Muscisaxicola but was moved to the monotypic genus Syrtidicola following the publication of a phylogenetic study in 2020.
