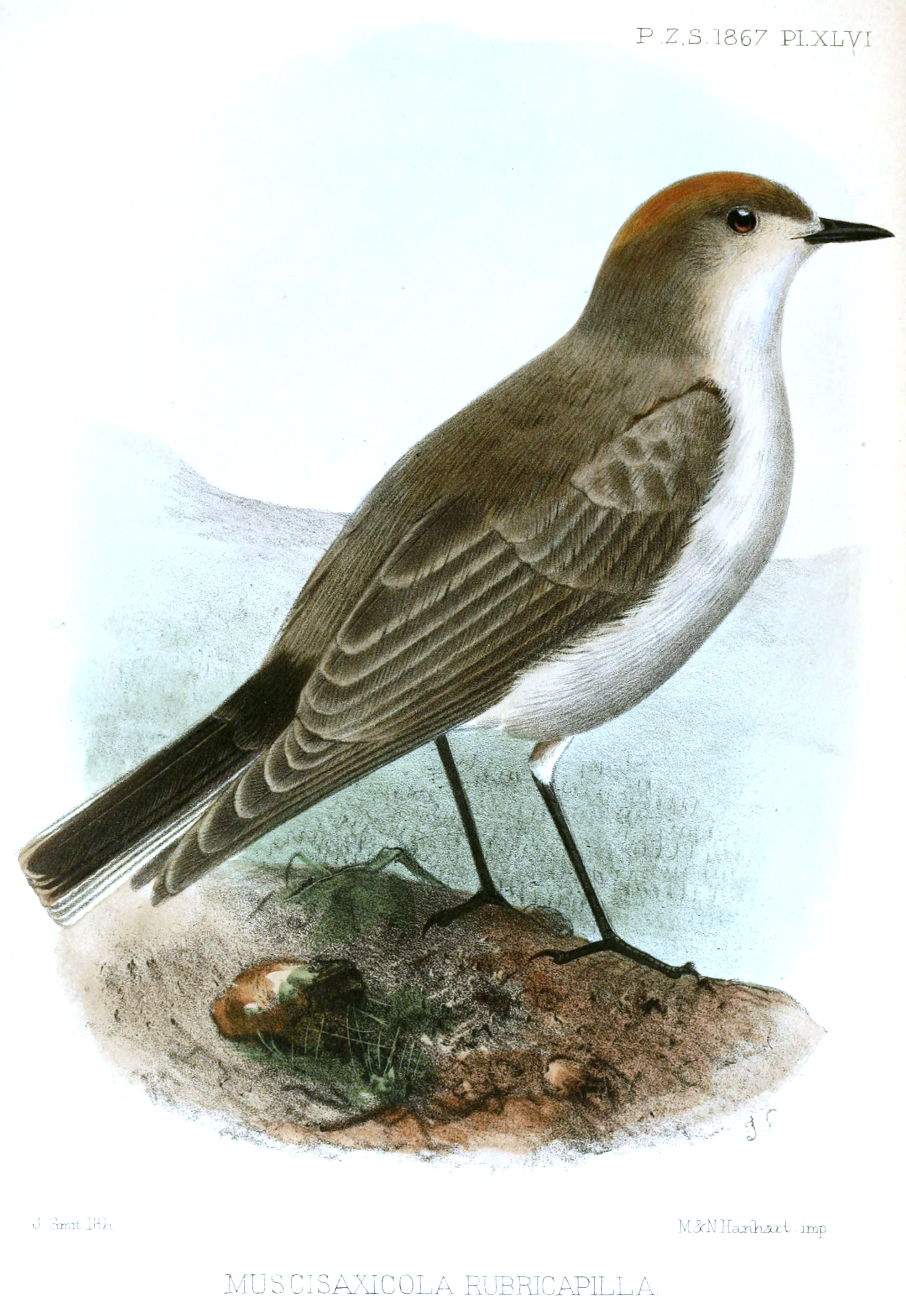
- Muscisaxicola rufivertex Joseph Smit, 1867

Conservation status
- Least Concern (IUCN 3.1)

Scientific classification
- Kingdom: Animalia
- Phylum: Chordata
- Class: Aves
- Order: Passeriformes
- Family: Tyrannidae
- Genus: Muscisaxicola
- Species: M. rufivertex

Binomial name
- Muscisaxicola rufivertex d'Orbigny & Lafresnaye, 1837

= Rufous-naped ground tyrant =

Species of bird

The rufous-naped ground tyrant (Muscisaxicola rufivertex) is a species of bird in the family Tyrannidae, the tyrant flycatchers. It is found in Argentina, Bolivia, Chile, and Peru.

== Taxonomy and systematics ==
As of April 2025 the rufous-naped ground tyrant's taxonomy is unsettled. The IOC assigns it these four subspecies:

- M. r. occipitalis Ridgway, 1887
- M. r. pallidiceps Hellmayr, 1927
- M. r. achalensis Nores & Yzurieta, 1983
- M. r. rufivertex d'Orbigny & Lafresnaye, 1837

The Clements taxonomy does not recognize M. r. achalensis. It annotates M. r. occipitalis as the "chestnut-naped", M. r. pallidiceps as the "pallidiceps", and M. r. rufivertex as the "rufous-naped" subspecies of the rufous-naped ground tyrant. BirdLife International's Handbook of the Birds of the World (HBW) includes only M. r. pallidiceps and M. r. rufivertex in the rufous-naped ground tyrant. It treats M. r. occipitalis as a separate species, the chestnut-naped ground tyrant, and does not recognize M. r. achalensis.

As far as possible this article follows the IOC four-subspecies treatment. (Note: Data for M. r. achalensis are from the English abstract and a Google translation from the Spanish of the Nores & Yzurieta paper that described it.)

== Description ==
The rufous-naped ground tyrant is 15.5 to 18 cm (6.1 to 7.1 in) long and weighs about 19 to 22 g (0.67 to 0.78 oz). The sexes have the same plumage. Adults of the nominate subspecies M. r. rufivertex have a bright cinnamon or orange-rufous patch on the crown and a faint white supercilium and broken eye-ring on an otherwise pale gray head. Their upperparts are also mostly pale gray, with a black lower rump. Their wings are a dusky gray. Their tail is dusky with thin white edges on the outer webs of the outermost feathers. Their throat and belly are whitish and their breast pale gray. Subspecies M. r. pallidiceps is smaller than the nominate and has a paler crown patch, a thinner supercilium, paler ashy gray upperparts, and a blacker tail. M. r. occipitalis is larger than the nominate, with a rufous crown, slightly darker wings, and a noticeably darker tail. Subspecies M. r. achalensis has a reddish-cinnamon crown, a white supercilium, brown wing coverts, blackish brown primaries and secondaries, and white underparts. All subspecies have a dark brown iris, a long thin black bill, and black legs and feet.

== Distribution and habitat ==
The rufous-naped ground tyrant has a disjunct distribution. The subspecies are found thus:

- M. r. occipitalis: from Cajamarca Department in north-central Peru south into northwestern Bolivia's La Paz and Cochabamba departments
- M. r. pallidiceps: from Arequipa Department in southwestern Peru south in Chile to the Antofagasta Region and through southwestern Bolivia into northwestern Argentina as far as La Rioja Province
- M. r. achalensis:Sierras de Córdoba in north-central Argentina
- M. r. rufivertex: Andes of Chile from the Atacama Region to the O'Higgins Region and east into Argentina's Mendoza, western Córdoba, and northeastern San Luis provinces

The rufous-naped ground tyrant inhabits open areas such as montane meadows and pastures. It appears to favor drier areas and rocky outcrops, slopes, ravines, and cliffs. Overall it ranges in elevation between 2,200 and 4,500 m (7,200 and 14,800 ft) in the breeding season and as low as 300 and 1,000 m (1,000 and 3,300 ft) in winter. In Peru it mostly ranges between 2,700 and 4,200 m (8,900 and 13,800 ft) and very locally down to 600 m (2,000 ft) near the southern coast. Subspecies M. r. achalensis is also an elevational migrant, breeding above 1,600 m (5,200 ft) and wintering "a little lower".

== Behavior ==
=== Movement ===
The nominate subspecies, M. r. pallidiceps, and M. r. achalensis are elevational migrants, descending to lower levels during the austral winter though details are lacking. M. r. pallidiceps may occur in southwestern Peru only as a migrant. Subspecies M. r. occipitalis is a year-round resident.

=== Feeding ===
The rufous-naped ground tyrant feeds on insects. It is almost wholly terrestrial; it will perch on rocks or a wall. It runs and hops along the ground, stopping to stand erect before grabbing prey, or less frequently makes a short sally to the ground from a low perch. In the breeding season it mostly forages by itself but is often in small flocks outside that season.

=== Breeding ===
The rufous-naped ground tyrant's breeding season is not fully defined but overall appears to be within the September to January span. Males make a display flight with a pause at the apex followed by a drop to the ground. The species' nest is an open cup of plant material, typically straw-like, and lined with feathers and hair. It usually is placed in a crevice between rocks. The clutch is three eggs. The incubation period, time to fledging, and details of parental care are not known. Shiny cowbirds (Molothrus bonariensis) are known to parasitize the species' nest.

=== Vocalization ===
As of April 2025 xeno-canto had four recordings of rufous-naped ground tyrant vocalizations; the Cornell Lab of Ornithology's Macaulay Library had eleven including one of the xeno-canto recordings. Subspecies M. r. occipitalis makes a "sharply upslurred but melodious weet" call. The nominate subspecies and M. r. pallidiceps make "a high-pitched tsit" and during its display flight males make a "thin, high-pitched twee-it". All of the described vocalizations might be common to all subspecies.

== Status ==
The IUCN follows HBW taxonomy and so has separately assessed the "rufous-naped" (sensu stricto) and "chestnut-naped" ground tyrants. Both are assessed at being of Least Concern. Both have large ranges and unknown population sizes that are believed to be stable. No immediate threats to either have been identified. The species is considered uncommon to locally common overall and occurs in several protected areas. It is "[o]ne of the most widespread and common Andean ground-tyrants" in Peru. Subspecies M. r. achalensis is considered common but not abundant.
