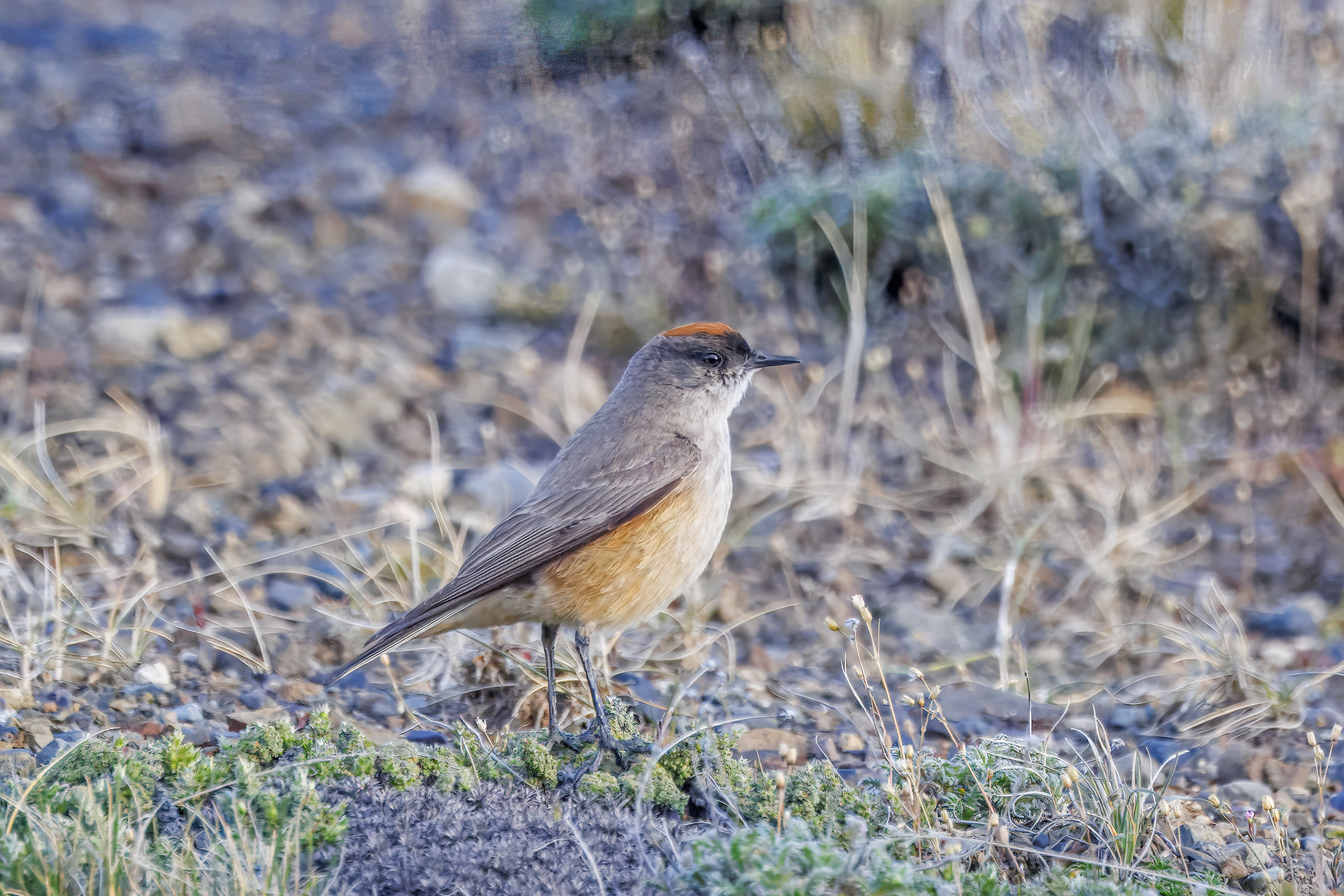
- In Torres del Paine, Chile

Conservation status
- Least Concern (IUCN 3.1)

Scientific classification
- Kingdom: Animalia
- Phylum: Chordata
- Class: Aves
- Order: Passeriformes
- Family: Tyrannidae
- Genus: Muscisaxicola
- Species: M. capistratus

Binomial name
- Muscisaxicola capistratus (Burmeister, 1860)
- Breeding Non-Breeding

Synonyms
- Ptyonura capistrata (protonym); Muscisaxicola capistrata

= Cinnamon-bellied ground tyrant =

Species of bird

The cinnamon-bellied ground tyrant (Muscisaxicola capistratus) is a species of bird in the family Tyrannidae, the tyrant flycatchers. It is found in Argentina, Bolivia, Chile, and Peru and as a vagrant to Brazil.

== Taxonomy and systematics ==
The cinnamon-bellied ground-tyrant was originally described as Ptyonura capistrata. It was eventually moved to genus Muscisaxicola that had been erected in 1837. It was later determined that Muscisaxicola is masculine so the specific epithet's case was changed to conform to binomial nomenclature.

The cinnamon-bellied ground tyrant is monotypic.

== Description ==
The cinnamon-bellied ground tyrant is 16.5 to 18 cm (6.5 to 7.1 in) long. The sexes have the same plumage. Adults have a black forecrown and a bright rufous-chestnut mid- and hindcrown. Their face, nape, and upperparts are dusky gray or brownish gray. Their wings are dusky with pale white edges on the flight feathers. Their tail is black with whitish edges on the outer webs of the outermost feathers. Their throat is whitish, their breast grayish buff, and their belly cinnamon-rufous or rufous-buff that is darker on the flanks and vent area. They have a dark iris, a black bill, and black legs and feet. Juveniles have a paler crown and belly than adults with small blackish tips on the feathers, buff edges on the wings, and faint mottling on the breast.

== Distribution and habitat ==
The cinnamon-bellied ground tyrant is found from Tierra del Fuego and southernmost mainland South America north along the Andes through eastern Chile, western Argentina, and southern and western Bolivia into the Lake Titicaca basin in southern Peru and only very rarely further north. It inhabits moist areas with short grass, typically on hillsides with scattered bushes and rocky outcrops, rocky canyons with patches of grass, and pastures. In the non-breeding season it also frequents cushion plant bogs and lakeshores. It breeds at elevations between sea level and 500 m (1,600 ft) but winters in Peru between 3,800 and 4,100 m (12,500 and 13,500 ft).

It has been documented as a vagrant in Brazil, far outside its normal range.

== Behavior ==
=== Movement ===
The cinnamon-bellied ground tyrant is a complete migrant. It breeds in far southern Chile's Magallanes Region including Tierra del Fuego and in far southern Argentina's Santa Cruz Province. For the austral winter it moves north through eastern Chile, western Argentina, and Bolivia to overwinter in the Lake Titicaca basin of northwestern Bolivia and southern Peru. It has also been observed a few times further north.

=== Feeding ===
The cinnamon-bellied ground tyrant feeds on insects. It is almost wholly terrestrial but will perch on rocks. It runs and hops along the ground, stopping to stand erect before grabbing prey, or drops on it from a rock. In the breeding season it mostly forages by itself or in pairs but is regularly in flocks outside that season.

=== Breeding ===
The cinnamon-bellied ground tyrant's breeding season has not been defined but appears to span September to March. Males make a display flight in which they hover high above the ground with dangling legs and a spread tail and then drop to the ground. The species' nest is an open cup made of grass and lined with feathers. It is usually placed among rocks such as on a talus slope. The clutch is three eggs. Nothing else is known about the species' breeding biology.

=== Vocalization ===
As of April 2025 xeno-canto had seven recordings of cinnamon-bellied ground tyrant vocalizations, all by a single recordist in Argentina on January 20, 2002. The Cornell Lab of Ornithology's Macaulay Library had five including one of the xeno-canto recordings. The species' vocalizations include a "high-pitched wee tee, wee tee tee and wee tee tee tee [and a] longer weetee weetee weeteewee wee wee".

== Conservation status ==
The IUCN has assessed the cinnamon-bellied ground tyrant as being of Least Concern. Its population size and trend are not known. No immediate threats have been identified. It is considered generally uncommon to locally fairly common and breeds in at least one national park in each of Chile and Argentina. Its "[p]opulation appears either to fluctuate greatly or to have decreased markedly in recent decades".
