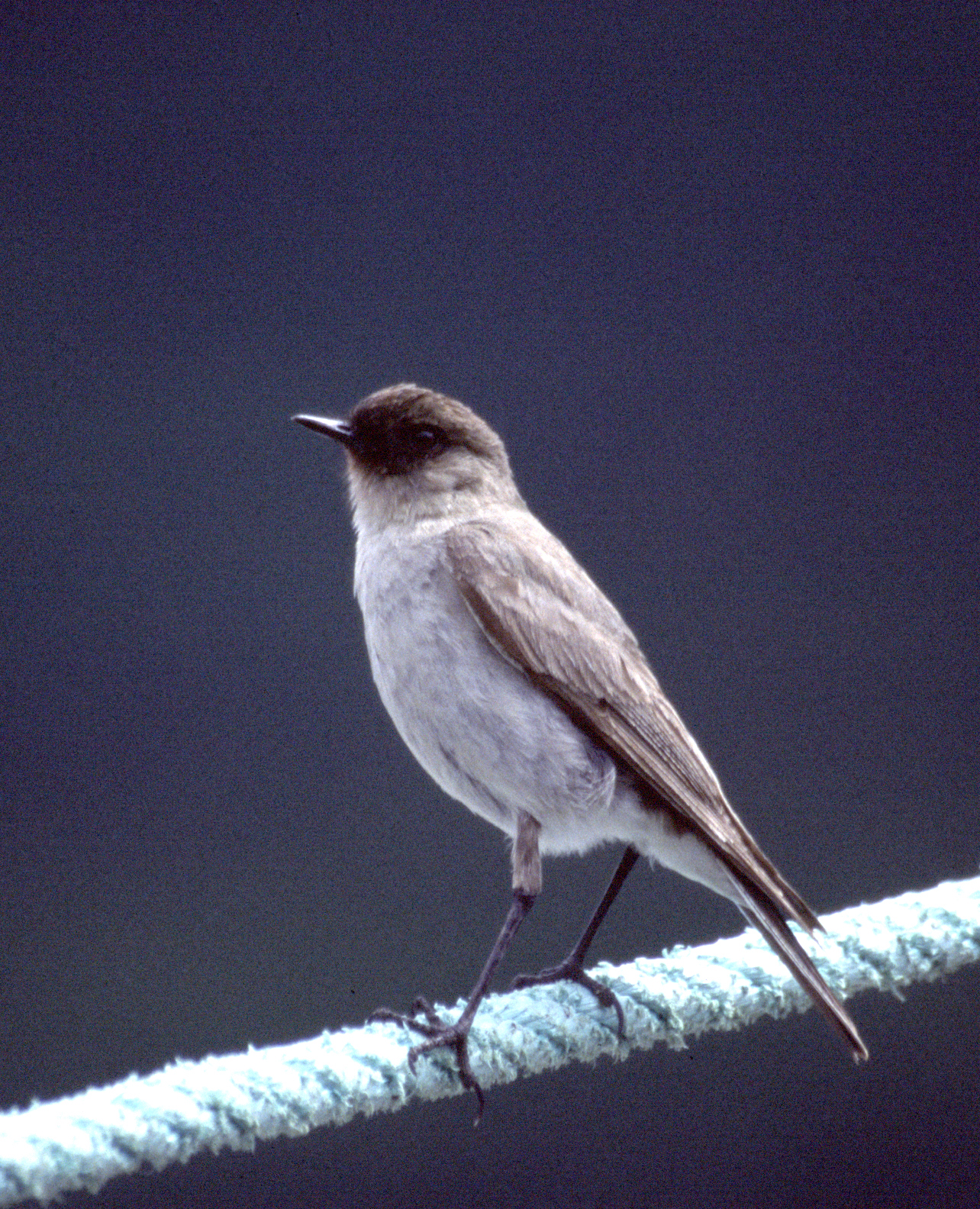
- Near Lago Escondido, Tierra del Fuego, Argentina

Conservation status
- Least Concern (IUCN 3.1)

Scientific classification
- Kingdom: Animalia
- Phylum: Chordata
- Class: Aves
- Order: Passeriformes
- Family: Tyrannidae
- Genus: Muscisaxicola
- Species: M. maclovianus

Binomial name
- Muscisaxicola maclovianus (Garnot, 1826)
- Breeding Year-round Non-Breeding

= Dark-faced ground tyrant =

Species of bird

The dark-faced ground tyrant (Muscisaxicola maclovianus) is a small passerine bird in the family Tyrannidae, the tyrant flycatchers. It is found in Argentina, Chile, Peru, Uruguay, the Falkland Islands, possibly in Ecuador, and as a vagrant to Brazil.

== Taxonomy and systematics ==
The dark-faced ground tyrant was originally described as Sylvia macloviana, placing it with the Old World warblers. It was eventually moved to genus Muscisaxicola which had been erected in 1837. Because that genus is masculine the specific epithet was changed to follow the rules of binomial nomenclature.

The dark-faced ground tyrant has two subspecies, the nominate M. m. macloviana (Garnot, 1826) and M. m. mentalis (d'Orbigny & Lafresnaye, 1837).

== Description ==
The dark-faced ground tyrant is 15 to 16.5 cm (5.9 to 6.5 in) long. The two subspecies and both sexes have the same plumage, though subspecies M. m. mentalis is significantly smaller than the nominate. Adults have a blackish forehead, lores, and cheeks and a dull chestnut-brown crown. Their upperparts are mostly dark brown to smoky brown with a black lower rump. Their wings are a duskier brown than the upperparts. Their tail is black with whitish edges on the outer webs of the outermost feathers. Their throat and breast are gray and their belly and crissum white. They have a dark iris, a short black bill, and black legs and feet. Juveniles have a streaky throat and buffy edges on the wing coverts.

== Distribution and habitat ==
The nominate subspecies of the dark-faced ground tyrant is found only on the Falkland Islands. Subspecies M. m. mentalis is found from southern Ancash Department in west-central Peru south through the length of Chile. Its range extends across Argentina roughly from San Juan Province (or perhaps further north) east to Entre Ríos Province and across southern Uruguay, and from that line south to Cape Horn. The species has reached southern Brazil and also South Georgia Island as a vagrant. In addition, unconfirmed sight records in Ecuador lead the South American Classification Committee of the American Ornithological Society to call it hypothetical there.

During the breeding season the dark-faced ground tyrant inhabits open grasslands that have forest nearby or are near rivers and also marshy areas in valleys. In the non-breeding season it inhabits grasslands and pastures but also irrigated fields, sandy desert, and beaches; at the last it sometimes is seen on dried or floating seaweed. One source places its usual upper elevation limit at 1,200 m (3,900 ft) with rare excursions to 2,500 m (8,200 ft). Another says its upper limit is 1,500 m (4,900 ft). A third says it reaches 4,000 m (13,000 ft) in Peru but only rarely.

== Behavior ==
=== Movement ===
The nominate subspecies of the dark-faced ground tyrant is a year-round resident on the Falkland Islands. Subspecies M. m. mentalis is highly migratory. Its breeding range extends from Chile and western Argentina from about the latitude of Araucanía Region south to Cape Horn. After breeding it spends the austral winter near the Pacific coast from that latitude north into Peru and also from southern mainland Argentina north to central Argentina and southern Uruguay.

=== Feeding ===
The dark-faced ground tyrant feeds on insects. It is almost wholly terrestrial; it will perch on trees or utility poles and sometimes hovers. It runs and hops along the ground, stopping to stand erect before grabbing prey, or drops on it from a perch or a hover. In the breeding season it mostly forages by itself but is often in flocks of up to 100 outside that season.

=== Breeding ===
The nominate subspecies of the dark-faced ground tyrant on the Falklands breeds between October and December. Subspecies M. m. mentalis breeds between September and March. Males make a display flight that drops from a peak to the ground where it faces a female and raises and lowers its wings. The species' nest is an open cup of grass, sometimes with rootlets included, and lined with feathers and mammalian hair. It is typically placed in a crevice or hollow between rocks. The clutch is two or three eggs. The incubation period is not known, fledging occurs about 18 days after hatch, and details of parental care are not known.

=== Vocalization ===
As of April 2025 xeno-canto had six recordings of dark-faced ground tyrant vocalizations; the Cornell Lab of Ornithology's Macaulay Library had 18 with some overlap between the two. The species' song is "reported as a warbling series of notes". During the flight display males call "a discreet zilip". Its alarm calls include "a series of loud cheep and rapid tu or chee-tú" notes.

== Status ==
The IUCN has assessed the dark-faced ground tyrant as being of Least Concern. It has a very large range; its population size is not known and is believed to be decreasing. No immediate threats have been identified. It is considered common overall and uncommon to fairly common in Peru during winter. "High-elevation populations [are] presumably at lower risk than are grassland populations, as grasslands are disappearing through overgrazing and agriculture."
