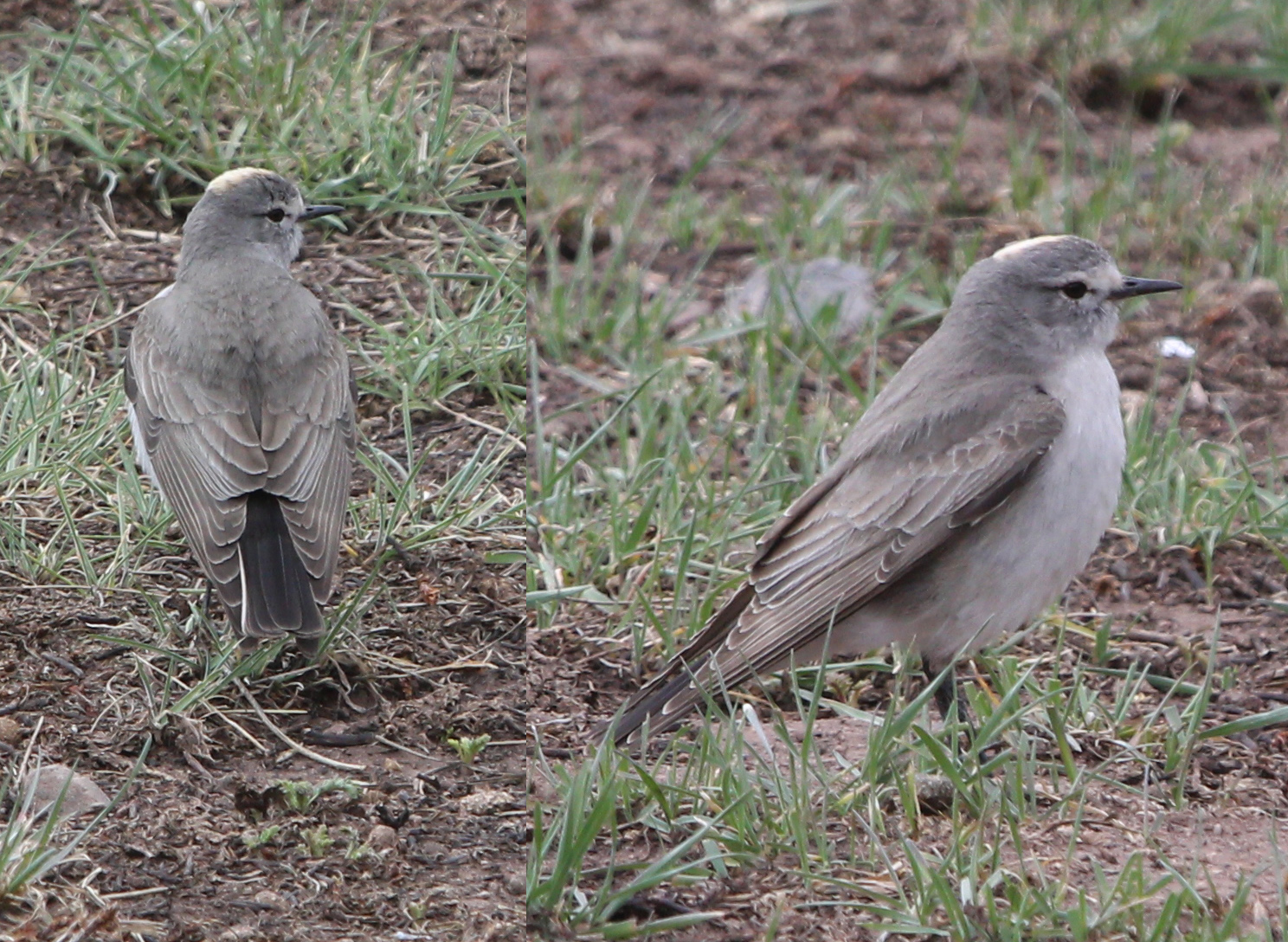

Conservation status
- Least Concern (IUCN 3.1)

Scientific classification
- Kingdom: Animalia
- Phylum: Chordata
- Class: Aves
- Order: Passeriformes
- Family: Tyrannidae
- Genus: Muscisaxicola
- Species: M. flavinucha

Binomial name
- Muscisaxicola flavinucha Lafresnaye, 1855
- Breeding Non-Breeding

= Ochre-naped ground tyrant =

Species of bird

The ochre-naped ground tyrant (Muscisaxicola flavinucha) is a species of bird in the family Tyrannidae, the tyrant flycatchers. It is found in Argentina, Bolivia, Chile, and Peru.

== Taxonomy and systematics ==
The ochre-naped ground tyrant has two subspecies, the nominate M. f. flavinucha (Lafresnaye, 1855) and M. f. brevirostris (Olrog, 1949).

== Description ==
The ochre-naped ground tyrant is 18.5 to 20 cm (7.3 to 7.9 in) long. The sexes have the same plumage. Adults of the nominate subspecies have a white forehead and supercilium and a pale ochre patch on the rear crown on an otherwise pale brownish gray face. Their nape and back are pale brownish gray. Their wings are a duskier brownish gray with thin white edges on the flight feathers. Their tail is black with white edges on the outer feathers. Their throat, breast, and upper belly are grayish white that becomes white on the lower belly and vent area. They have a dark brown iris, a long black bill, and black legs and feet. Juveniles have a faint crown patch or none at all and buff edges on the flight feathers. Subspecies M. f. brevirostris is darker overall than the nominate with a slightly smaller bill and slightly shorter wings.

== Distribution and habitat ==
The ochre-naped ground tyrant is primarily a bird of the southern Andes. The nominate subspecies breeds in northern and central Chile from the Antofagasta Region south to the O'Higgins Region and in west-central Argentina from Mendoza Province south to Santa Cruz Province. Subspecies M. f. brevirostris breeds from the nominate's range south through both Chile and Argentina to Tierra del Fuego. Both subspecies vacate their breeding range to winter from northern Chile and northwestern Argentina north through western Bolivia into Peru as far as La Libertad Department.

The ochre-naped ground tyrant inhabits puna grassland, bogs, and rocky slopes with sparse vegetation but near water. In elevation it mostly ranges between 2,000 and 4,500 m (6,600 and 14,800 ft) but breeds as low as 500 m (1,600 ft) in northern Chile and sometimes gets to near sea level there. It ranges between 3,800 and 4,900 m (12,500 and 16,100 ft) in Peru.

== Behavior ==
=== Movement ===
The ochre-naped ground tyrant's primary migration pattern is described in the Distribution section. There is also some slight evidence of breeding further north in southern Bolivia and southern Peru.

=== Feeding ===
The ochre-naped ground tyrant feeds on insects. It walks, runs, and hops on the ground seeking prey. Less often it makes short sallies from the ground or a rock to take prey in mid-air. On the ground it searches through plants and leaf litter as well as on bare ground.

=== Breeding ===
The ochre-naped ground tyrant breeds in the austral summer between October and February. Males make a display flight with dangling legs. The species' nest is an open cup made from grass lined with feathers. It is placed on the ground, in a rock crevice, under a rock overhang, or in an abandoned rodent burrow. The clutch is two to four eggs but most frequently three. Nothing else is known about the species' breeding biology.

=== Vocalization ===
As of April 2025 xeno-canto had only four recordings of ochre-naped ground tyrant vocalizations. The Cornell Lab of Ornithology's Macaulay Library had 11, one of which is also on xeno-canto. The species' voice is described as "short high-pitched bursts, tsee tee tsee tseet".

== Status ==
The IUCN has assessed the ochre-naped ground tyrant as being of Least Concern. It has a large range; its population size is not known and is believed to be stable. No immediate threats have been identified. It is considered overall uncommon to locally fairly common though "one of the most abundant ground-tyrants in [central] Chile". It is a "fairly common austral migrant" in Peru. It occurs in several national parks within its breeding range and in at least one in Bolivia.
