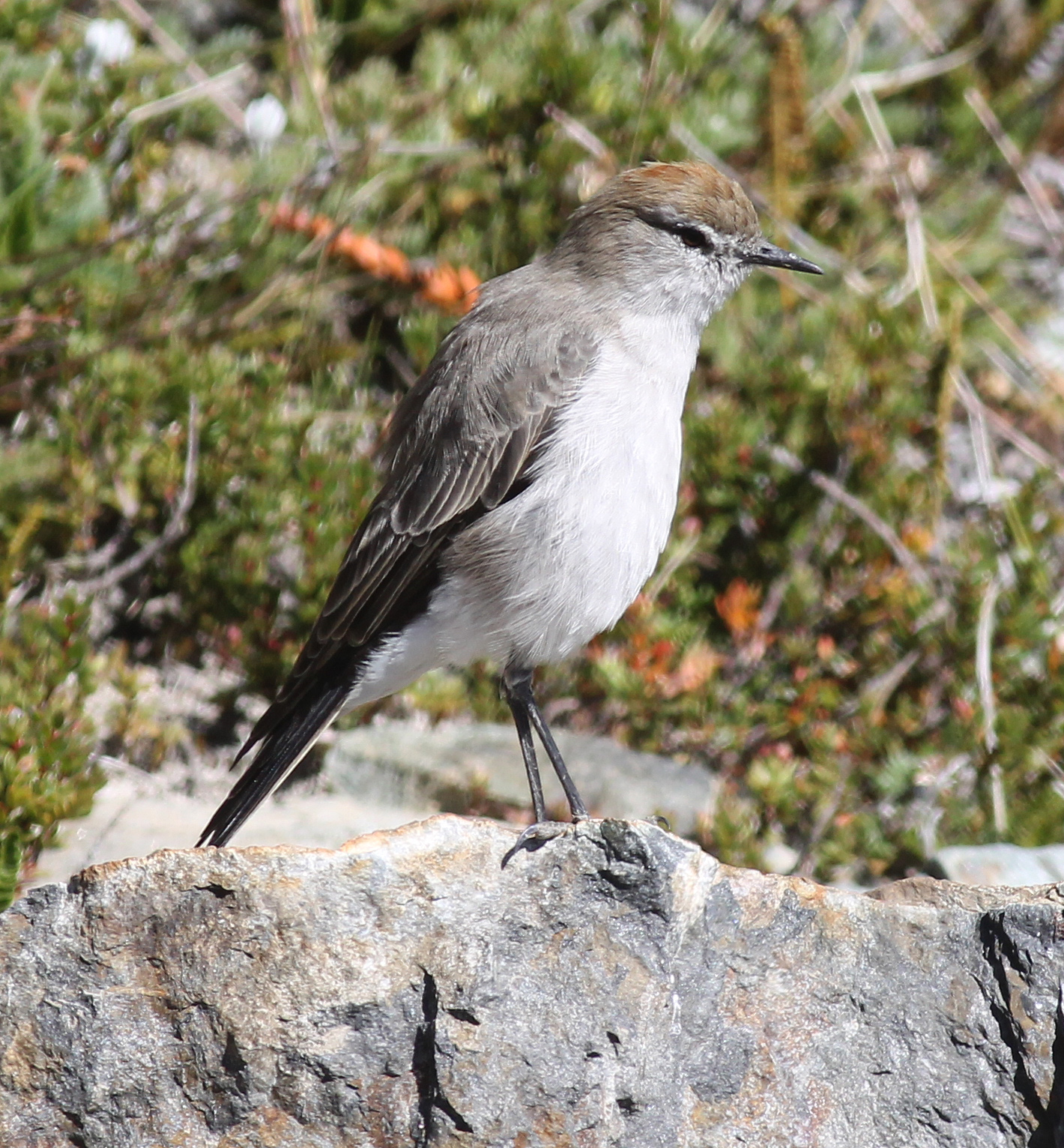

Conservation status
- Least Concern (IUCN 3.1)

Scientific classification
- Kingdom: Animalia
- Phylum: Chordata
- Class: Aves
- Order: Passeriformes
- Family: Tyrannidae
- Genus: Muscisaxicola
- Species: M. albilora

Binomial name
- Muscisaxicola albilora Lafresnaye, 1855
- Breeding Non-Breeding

= White-browed ground tyrant =

Species of bird

The white-browed ground tyrant (Muscisaxicola albilora) is a species of bird in the family Tyrannidae, the tyrant flycatchers. It is found in Argentina, Bolivia, Chile, Ecuador, and Peru, and as a vagrant to Colombia, Uruguay, and the Falkland Islands.

== Taxonomy and systematics ==
The white-browed ground tyrant is monotypic. However, the authors of an early twentieth century publication suggested possibly treating M. juninensis (then the Junin ground-tyrant, now the puna ground tyrant) as a subspecies of it.

== Description ==
The white-browed ground tyrant is 15 to 17.5 cm (5.9 to 6.9 in) long and weighs about 25 to 29 g (0.88 to 1.0 oz). The sexes have the same plumage. Adults have a tawny forecrown, a rufous hindcrown, and a long thin white supercilium. Their upperparts are brownish gray. Their wings are dusky gray. Their tail is black with whitish edges on the outer webs of the outermost feathers. Their throat, breast, and belly are pale gray and their crissum whitish. They have a dark brown iris, a long dusky bill, and dusky legs and feet. Juveniles have a brown crown, dull rufous edges on the wing coverts, and light streaking on the breast and belly.

== Distribution and habitat ==
The white-browed ground tyrant is found along the Andes from northern Ecuador south through Peru, western and southern Bolivia, and the length of eastern Chile and western Argentina to Chile's Magallanes Region. There are also a moderate number of records from both Chilean and Argentinian Tierra del Fuego. In addition it has been documented as a vagrant on Gorgona island off the Colombian coast and in Uruguay and the Falkland Islands. In its breeding range in Chile and Argentina it inhabits open montane grasslands and shrublands both natural and used by humans as pasture. They are often rocky and the species sometimes favors areas near marshes and lakes within them. In elevation there it ranges in elevation from near sea level in the far south to typically 1,400 to 4,000 m (4,600 to 13,100 ft) further north. In the non-breeding season it also inhabits open grasslands with much favor shown to areas near marshes and lakes. In Peru it ranges in elevation between 2,900 and 4,200 m (9,500 and 13,800 ft). In Ecuador it is found in páramo as well as grasslands. There it ranges in elevation mostly between 2,400 and 3,700 m (7,900 and 12,100 ft).

== Behavior ==
=== Movement ===
The white-browed ground tyrant is a complete migrant. It breeds from the Valparaíso Region in central Chile and adjoining Mendoza Province in western Argentina south to the southern tip of the mainland and sparsely on Tierra del Fuego. It entirely vacates that area for the austral winter, moving north to northern Chile, northwestern Argentina, Bolivia, the length of Peru, and sparely along the length of Ecuador. During migration it can form flocks of several hundred birds including other Muscisaxicola species.

=== Feeding ===
The white-browed ground tyrant feeds on insects, though details are lacking. It is almost wholly terrestrial but will perch on rocks. It runs and hops along the ground, stopping to stand erect before grabbing prey, or drops on it from a rock. In the breeding season it mostly forages by itself or in pairs but is sometimes in flocks outside that season.

=== Breeding ===
The white-browed ground tyrant's breeding season has not been fully defined but appears to span October to February. Males make an aerial courtship display. The species' nest is an open cup made from grass and lined with feathers; the female alone is thought to build it. It is typically placed in an almost-treeless area in a crevice or hollow between rocks. The clutch is two to three eggs that are white with red dots around one end. The incubation period and time to fledging are not known. Both parents provision nestlings.

=== Vocalization ===
The white-browed ground tyrant appears to be more vocal than other ground tyrants. The most common vocalization (or most commonly recorded) is "a high-pitched...short, slightly rising tset or tseek, with some variation". During the courtship flight males make a "clet ip" call. What appears to be the species' alarm call is a "high-pitched, short and abrupt tsip". It has been recorded making short trills in the breeding range whose "context and function" are not known.

== Status ==
The IUCN has assessed the white-browed ground tyrant as being of Least Concern. It has a very large range; its population size is not known and is believed to be stable. No immediate threats have been identified. It is considered generally fairly common; in central Chile it is "the most numerous breeding ground-tyrant". It is considered a "fairly common migrant" in Peru and an "uncommon austral winter visitor" in Ecuador. "However, climate change is disproportionately impacting highland habitats where this species breeds [which] may change, impact, and threaten the breeding performance of White-browed Ground-Tyrant.
