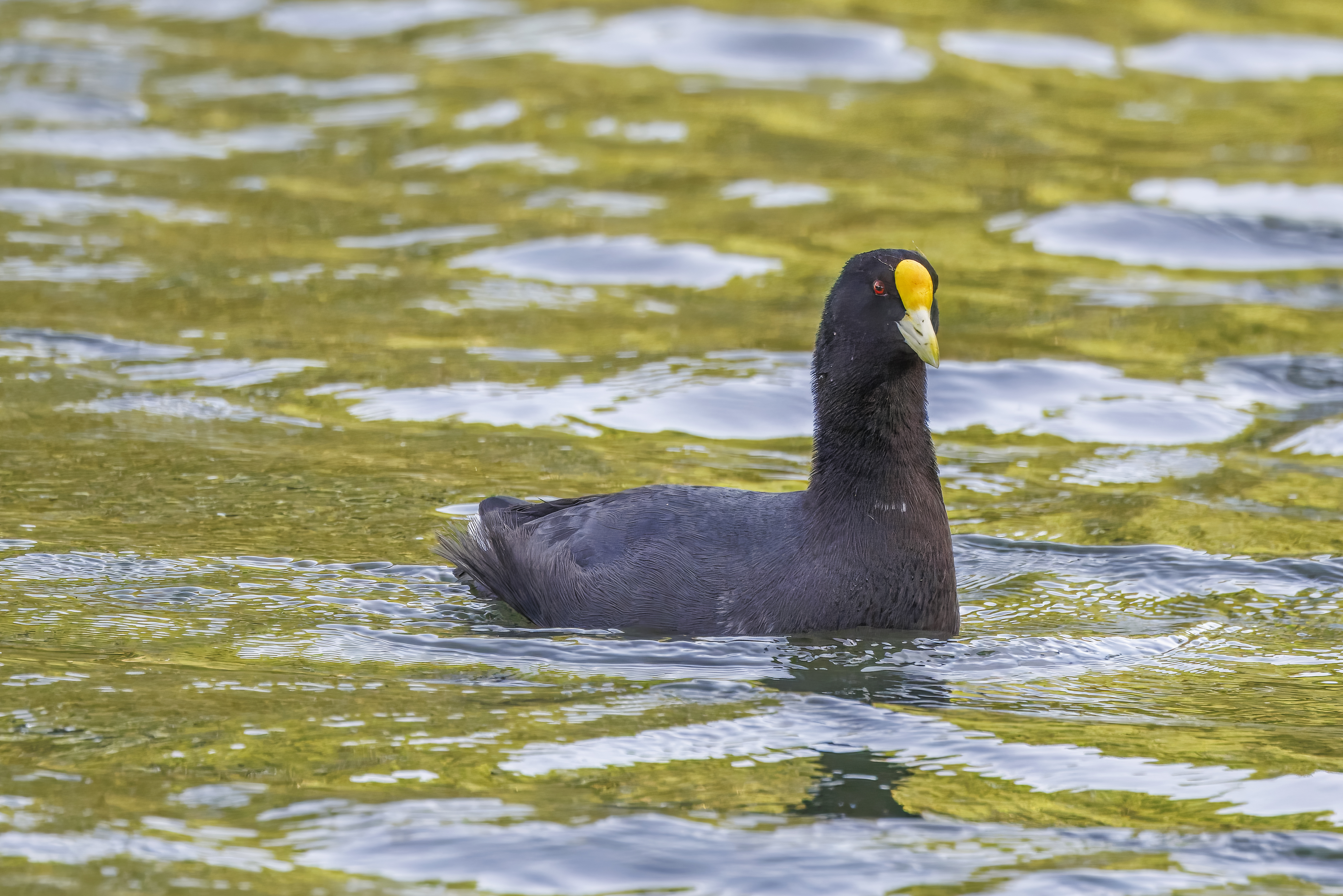
- In Argentina

Conservation status
- Least Concern (IUCN 3.1)

Scientific classification
- Kingdom: Animalia
- Phylum: Chordata
- Class: Aves
- Order: Gruiformes
- Family: Rallidae
- Genus: Fulica
- Species: F. leucoptera

Binomial name
- Fulica leucoptera Vieillot, 1817

= White-winged coot =

Species of bird

The white-winged coot (Fulica leucoptera) is a species of bird in the subfamily Rallinae of the family Rallidae. It is found in Argentina, Bolivia, Brazil, Chile, Paraguay, Uruguay, and the Falkland Islands.

== Taxonomy and systematics ==
The white-winged coot is monotypic.

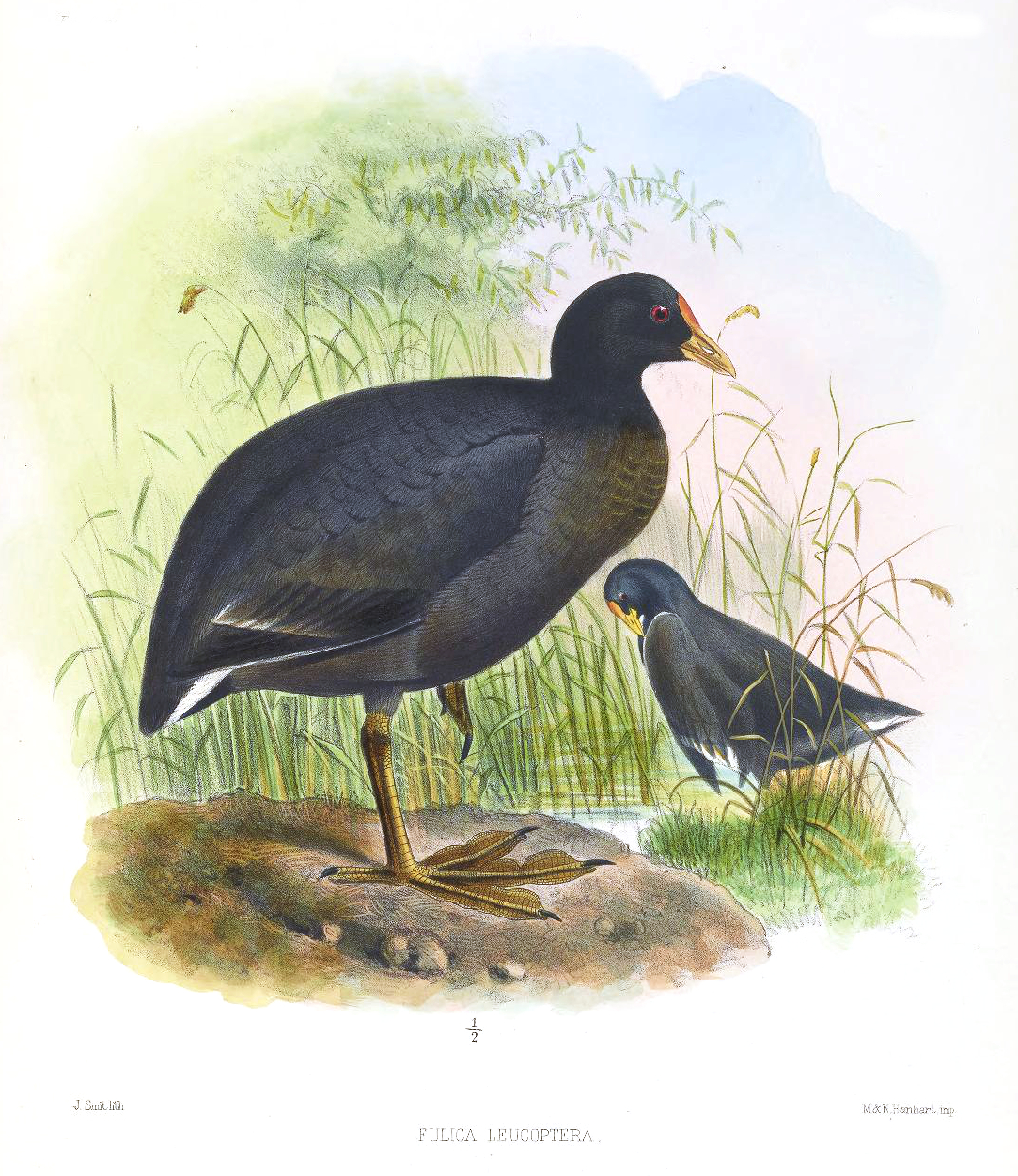
Illustration by Joseph Smit, 1869

== Description ==
The white-winged coot is 35 to 43 cm (14 to 17 in) long and weighs about 400 to 600 g (14 to 21 oz). The sexes are alike. Adults have a yellow to greenish yellow bill and a small yellow to orange-yellow frontal shield, though these colors may further vary. Their legs and feet are pale sea green to yellow-green and have blackish toes and joints. Their plumage is slaty gray that is blacker on the head and neck. They have white undertail coverts, and wide white tips on the secondaries provide the English name. Immature birds have a dusky olive bill, greenish gray legs and feet, gray-brown upperparts, and paler underparts than adults. Juveniles are dark drab gray with dusky mottling on a white head and neck.

== Distribution and habitat ==
The white-winged coot is found in most of southern South America, in northern to central Chile and separately from eastern and southern Bolivia, Paraguay, and far southeastern Brazil south through Uruguay and Argentina into Tierra del Fuego. There is also a population in the Falkland Islands and the species occurs as a vagrant in Peru. It inhabits freshwater lagoons, ponds, marshes, and river backwaters, favoring those with grassy or bare shores and many submerged plants or floating duckweed. It is sometimes found on saltwater close to shore.

== Behavior ==
=== Movement ===
The white-winged coot is present year-round in southeastern Brazil but elsewhere makes local seasonal movements.

=== Feeding ===
The white-winged coot feeds mostly on aquatic vegetation, though it also grazes on land away from water. In water it mostly feeds on the surface but occasionally dives. Except when breeding it is gregarious and usually seen in large flocks.

=== Breeding ===
The white-winged coot's breeding season varies geographically. In Argentina's lowlands it breeds between April and November and at higher elevations between November and January. In Brazil it nests throughout the austral summer. The species is monogamous, and territorial when breeding. It makes a floating platform nest of rushes and other plants, sometimes in emergent vegetation but also on beds of floating plants. The usual clutch size is 10 to 12 eggs though fewer are sometimes laid. Both parents provision the young.

=== Vocalization ===
The white-winged coot is very vocal, making a "variety of loud, hollow cackling calls and clucking notes" some of which sound like human laughter. Aggressive males make a "huc" call.

== Conservation status ==
The IUCN has assessed the white-winged coot as being of Least Concern. It has a very large range, and though its population size is not known it is believed to be stable. No immediate threats have been identified. It is "reckoned to be generally common" and gathers in flocks of thousands on large marshes in the Argentinian Pampas.
