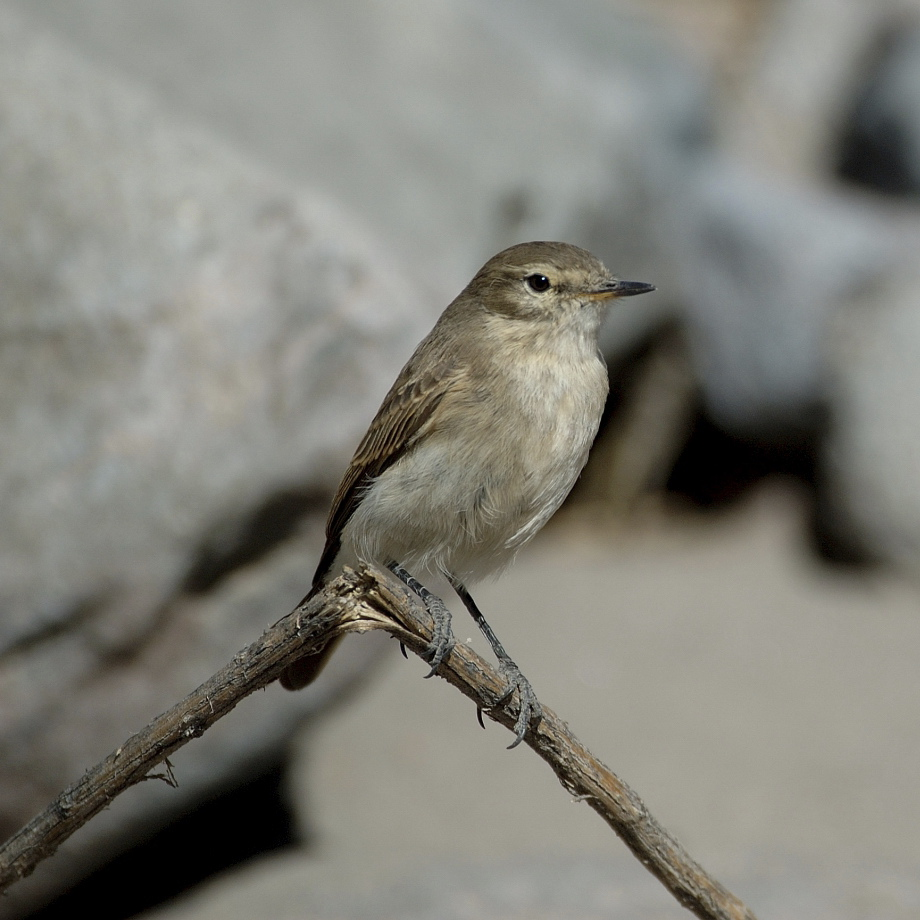
- Arequipa, Peru

Conservation status
- Least Concern (IUCN 3.1)

Scientific classification
- Kingdom: Animalia
- Phylum: Chordata
- Class: Aves
- Order: Passeriformes
- Family: Tyrannidae
- Genus: Muscisaxicola
- Species: M. maculirostris

Binomial name
- Muscisaxicola maculirostris D'Orbigny & Lafresnaye, 1837
- Breeding Year-round

= Spot-billed ground tyrant =

Species of bird

The spot-billed ground tyrant (Muscisaxicola maculirostris) is a species of bird in the family Tyrannidae, the tyrant flycatchers. It is found in Argentina, Bolivia, Chile, Colombia, Ecuador, and Peru and as a vagrant in Brazil.

== Taxonomy and systematics ==
The spot-billed ground tyrant has three subspecies, the nominate M. m. maculirostris (D'Orbigny & Lafresnaye, 1837), M. m. niceforoi (Zimmer, JT, 1947), and M. m. rufescens (Berlepsch & Stolzmann, 1896).

== Description ==
The spot-billed ground tyrant is 14 to 15.5 cm (5.5 to 6.1 in) long and weighs 11 to 17 g (0.39 to 0.60 oz). The sexes have the same plumage. Adults of the nominate subspecies have an olive-brown crown, a whitish to buffy white supercilium and spot above their lores, a dusky line through the eye, and an olive to gray patch on the ear coverts on an otherwise whitish to dusky face. Their nape and back are olive-brown. Their wing coverts are olive-brown with buff to rufous edges. Their remiges are dusky to brownish with thin pale rufous edges. Their tail is dusky brownish to black with thin whitish or pale yellowish outer webs on the feathers. Their chin and throat are whitish, their breast and belly whitish with olive mottling or dusky streaking on the breast, and their undertail coverts whitish to white. With wear their upperparts fade to grayish and the wing covert edges pale. They have a narrow, sharp, medium-length blackish to brownish-black bill with a conspicuous yellow to orangish yellow base to the mandible. They have a dark brown iris and black legs and feet. Juveniles are essentially paler versions of adults, though the edges on their wing coverts are more rusty.

Subspecies M. m. niceforoi has more light brown (less olive) upperparts than the nominate, with blackish uppertail coverts. Their breast is slightly buffy and their belly pale pinkish buff with flanks a slightly darker pinkish buff. Their wings are dark brown with paler edges on the coverts and remiges. Their tail is blackish with whitish outer webs and blackish tips on the outermost feathers. M. m. rufescens is overall more cinnamon to pale rufus than the other two subspecies. Their underparts are cinnamon buff and the inner edges of their remiges are bright ochraceous.

== Distribution and habitat ==
The three subspecies of the spot-billed ground tyrant are wholly allopatric. The nominate subspecies is the southernmost and has by far the largest range. It is found in the Andes from southern Amazonas and Cajamarca departments in northern Peru south through the rest of the country, reaching the coast in the southern part of the country. Its range extends through western and central Bolivia and along the entire length of the Andes of Chile and Argentina. Subspecies M. m. niceforoi is found locally along the Colombian Andes from southern Boyacá Department south to Cundinamarca Department and the Bogotá area. M. m. rufescens is found in the Andes of Ecuador from Imbabura Province south to Chimborazo Province and perhaps further south. There are is a record in far southern Colombia. In addition, the South American Classification Committee of the American Ornithological Society has records of vagrants of the species in Brazil.

The spot-billed ground tyrant inhabits a variety of landscapes, all of which are sparsely vegetated and often rocky. The nominate subspecies occurs from the temperate zone all the way up to alpine areas, typically on slopes with rock walls and some grasses and shrubs. In Argentina is also occurs around saline lakes. In elevation it ranges between 2,000 and 4,500 m (6,600 and 14,800 ft), though mostly between 1,500 and 2,200 m (4,900 and 7,200 ft) and as low as 1,000 m (3,300 ft) in Chile and Argentina. Subspecies M. m. niceforoi is found in dry open landscapes and agricultural areas below the páramo zone at elevations between 2,000 and 3,400 m (6,600 and 11,200 ft). M. m. rufescens inhabits similar open, almost arid natural and agricultural landscapes, mostly between 2,400 and 3,500 m (7,900 and 11,500 ft).

== Behavior ==
=== Movement ===
Subspecies M. m. niceforoi and M. m. rufescens are year-round residents. The nominate subspecies is a year-round resident in Peru, Bolivia, and northern Chile and Argentina. South of there only breeds, and mostly migrates north into the year-round range. An unknown percentage of this breeding population migrates instead to lower elevations rather than north. There is also some evidence of small northward movement in northern Peru.

=== Feeding ===
The spot-billed ground tyrant feeds primarily on insects and also includes fruits and maybe flowers and nectar in its diet. It typically forages singly or in pairs during the breeding season and often in small flocks outside it. It stands and walks in the open and often perches on rocks, shrubs, or partway up a rock wall to search. It typically captures prey on the ground and with short flights to hawk it in mid-air. In agricultural areas it sometimes follows tractors and other machinery.

=== Breeding ===
The spot-billed ground tyrant nests between October and February in Chile and Argentina; north of there it has bred in each month of the year. Males perform a flight display that has been compared to those of some pipits. Its nest is a cup on the ground made from a variety of plant fibers including grass and hay, animal hair, and small stones lined with softer material. The clutch is two to four eggs, though apparently two eggs is rare and no nest has been found with more than three chicks. The incubation period and time to fledging are not known. Both parents provision nestlings.

=== Vocalization ===
The spot-billed ground tyrant is the most vocal species in its genus. Males sing during the flight display, "a prolonged series of Pit notes accelerating slightly into a higher-pitched flourish ending with two short, clear whistles: Pi-tew!". It also makes separate pit, pip, and pew calls.

== Status ==
The IUCN has assessed the spot-billed ground tyrant as being of Least Concern. It has a very large range; its population size is not known and is believed to be stable. No immediate threats have been identified. It is considered very local in Colombia and fairly common in Peru. Most of its habitat in Colombia has been converted to human uses and the introduced "invasive grass species Pennisetum clandestinum has radically modified the typical habitats that the species uses" in that country. The nominate subspecies occurs in several protected areas.
