= Xeno-canto =

Online database of wildlife sounds

xeno-canto
- Website type: Audio clip sharing
- Available in: Dutch; English; French; German; Polish; Portuguese; Russian; Norwegian; Swedish
- Website: www.xeno-canto.org
- Commercial: No
- Registration: Optional
- Launched: May 30, 2005; 21 years ago
- Current status: Active

xeno-canto is a citizen science project and repository in which volunteers record, upload and annotate recordings of birds, orthoptera, bats, frogs and land mammals. Since it began in 2005, it has collected over 1,000,000 sound recordings from more than 12,900 species worldwide, and has become one of the biggest open collections of wildlife sounds in the world. All the recordings are published under one of the Creative Commons licenses, including some with open licences. Each recording on the website is accompanied by a spectrogram and location data on a map displaying geographical variation.

Data from xeno-canto has been re-used in many (a few thousand) scientific papers. It has also been the source of data for an annual challenge on automatic birdsong recognition ("BirdCLEF") since 2014, conducted as part of the Conference and Labs of the Evaluation Forum.

The website is supported by a number of academic and birdwatching institutions worldwide, with its primary support being in the Netherlands.

== History ==
xeno-canto, which translates to "strange sound", is a sounds-only project seeking to highlight sounds of birds, rather than images or videos. xeno-canto was launched on May 30, 2005, by Bob Planqué, a mathematical biologist at Vrije Universiteit Amsterdam, and Willem-Pier Vellinga, a physicist who now consults for a global materials technology company. At the time of the launch, the site held recordings of only about 160 species and originally aimed to collect recordings of birds from Central and South America.

== Growth ==
xeno-canto has now become global, expanding its coverage to North America, Africa and Asia, and finally to Europe and Australasia. By 2017, the data collection showed significant growth, containing about 360,000 recordings of about 9,750 bird species (which is nearly 90 percent of all bird species). Nevertheless, the collection is still far from complete. There are about 1,000 missing species, and for many species, there are only a few recordings, meaning they lack the variation in repertoire and dialect that the species display.

== Goals ==
xeno-canto aims to utilize the capabilities of the internet to improve the general popularity, accessibility, and knowledge of bird sounds. So far, the recordings on xeno-canto have seen use in a variety of different ways including being featured on the Aviation Information System of India, contributing to the STERNA project, and being included in a Norwegian University's database.

Since its founding, the website has set a number of set principles in order to keep the service community-driven. These principles include:

- Anybody can contribute to the project. Aside from a few restrictions on the file size, users can upload any bird sound they find interesting. On top of uploading recordings, users can also write articles, comment on recording achievements, and even contribute to the website's code.
- Recordings are shared. The Creative Commons licenses implemented by the website promote sharing. The bird sounds uploaded are intended to be re-used. Users can download individual recordings found when browsing or access the entire collection's database.
- Recordings can be challenged. Fellow users can flag a recording as having an incorrect identification. The recording is then reviewed until agreed upon by the community, and the flag is reset by administrators. This process can vary in length, but most often takes a few days.
