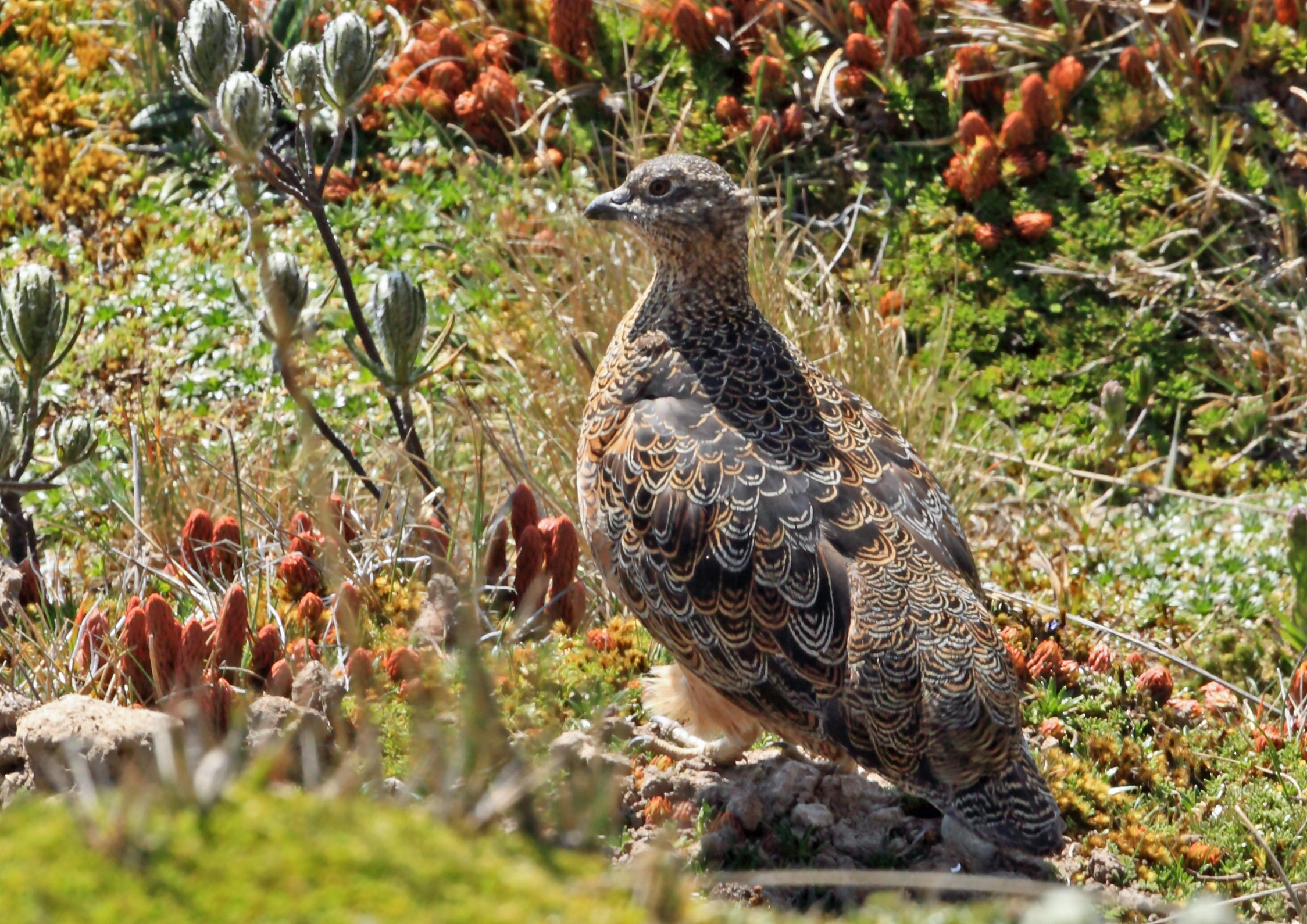

Conservation status
- Least Concern (IUCN 3.1)

Scientific classification
- Kingdom: Animalia
- Phylum: Chordata
- Class: Aves
- Order: Charadriiformes
- Family: Thinocoridae
- Genus: Attagis
- Species: A. gayi

Binomial name
- Attagis gayi Geoffroy Saint-Hilaire, I & Lesson, RP, 1831

= Rufous-bellied seedsnipe =

Species of bird

The rufous-bellied seedsnipe (Attagis gayi) is a bird in suborder Scolopaci of order Charadriiformes, the shorebirds. It is found in Argentina, Bolivia, Chile, Ecuador, and Peru.

== Taxonomy and systematics ==
The rufous-bellied seedsnipe shares its genus with the white-bellied seedsnipe (A. malouinus). They and the other two seedsnipes are closely related to the sandpipers of family Scolopacidae. It has three subspecies, the nominate A. g. gayi, A. g. latrelillii, and A. g. simonsi. At least one publication has suggested that A. g. latrelillii might deserve to be recognized as a species.

The rufous-bellied seedsnipe's specific epithet commemorates the French naturalist Claude Gay.

== Description ==
The rufous-bellied seedsnipe is 27 to 30 cm (11 to 12 in) long and weighs about 280 to 400 g (9.9 to 14 oz). The sexes are alike. The nominate subspecies' upperparts have an intricate scallop pattern of rufous-brown and blackish; its underparts are unmarked pale pinkish cinnamon. Subspecies A. g. latrelillii has a deeper rufous cinnamon than the nominate in its vent area and a scalloped breast. A. g. simonsi's breast is a darker pinkish cinnamon than the nominate's; it is paler above with finer markings. Juveniles much resemble adults but with somewhat finer markings on their upperparts.

== Distribution and habitat ==
Subspecies A. g. latrelillii of rufous-bellied seedsnipe is found far from the other subspecies, on seven high volcanoes in north-central Ecuador. A. g. simonsi is found from central Peru south through northern Chile and western Bolivia into northwestern Argentina. The nominate A. g. gayi is found from north central Chile and west central Argentina south almost to Tierra del Fuego.

The rufous-bellied seedsnipe inhabits alpine terrain in the Andes, often as high as the snow line. It frequents boggy and other moist areas but also occurs in drier and rockier landscapes. Subspecies A. g. latrelillii is typically found in páramo. In the northern half of its range it mostly is found between 4,000 and 5,500 m (13,100 and 18,000 ft). Further south it occurs down to 2,000 m (6,600 ft) and in the extreme south as low as 1,000 m (3,300 ft).

== Behavior ==
=== Movement ===
The rufous-bellied seedsnipe is essentially non-migratory, though southern populations are thought to move to lower elevation in the austral winter. It is a strong flier and when flushed flies in a fast zigzag.

=== Feeding ===
The rufous-bellied seedsnipe feeds on plant matter, typically in moist areas, but details of its diet are lacking.

=== Breeding ===
Little is known about the rufous-bellied seedsnipe's breeding biology. It lays eggs during September and October in Chile; further north the season extends to December. Its nest is a shallow scrape in the ground and the clutch size is typically four eggs.

=== Vocalization ===
The rufous-bellied seedsnipe frequently calls when flying and also while running; its call is "a melodic-sounding 'gly-gly-gly...' or 'cul-cul-cul...'" which several birds may make simultaneously.

== Status ==
The IUCN has assessed the rufous-bellied seedsnipe as being of Least Concern. It has a very large range, and though its population size is not known it is believed to be stable. No immediate threats have been identified. It occurs in several protected areas and is considered generally fairly common except in Ecuador. However, it is persecuted in some mining areas.
