= Beak =

Facial structure found in birds and various other animal clades

Comparison of bird beaks, displaying different shapes adapted to different feeding methods; not to scale

The beak or bill is an external rostrum structure found mostly in birds. A beak is used for pecking, grasping, and holding (in probing for food, eating, manipulating and carrying objects, killing prey, or fighting), preening, courtship, and feeding young. The terms beak and rostrum are also used to refer to a similar organ in some non-avian theropods, ornithischians, pterosaurs, cetaceans, dicynodonts, rhynchosaurs, anuran tadpoles, turtles, monotremes (i.e. echidnas and platypuses, which have a bill-like structure), sirens, pufferfish, billfishes, parrotfish and cephalopods.

Although beaks vary significantly in size, shape, color and texture, they share a similar underlying structure. Two bony projections–the upper and lower mandibles–are covered with a thin keratinized layer of epidermis known as the rhamphotheca. In most species, two holes called nares lead to the respiratory system.

== Etymology ==
Although the word "beak" was, in the past, generally restricted to the sharpened bills of birds of prey, in modern ornithology, the terms beak and bill are generally considered to be synonymous. The word, which dates from the 13th century, comes from the Middle English bec (via Anglo-French), which itself comes from the Latin beccus.

== Anatomy ==
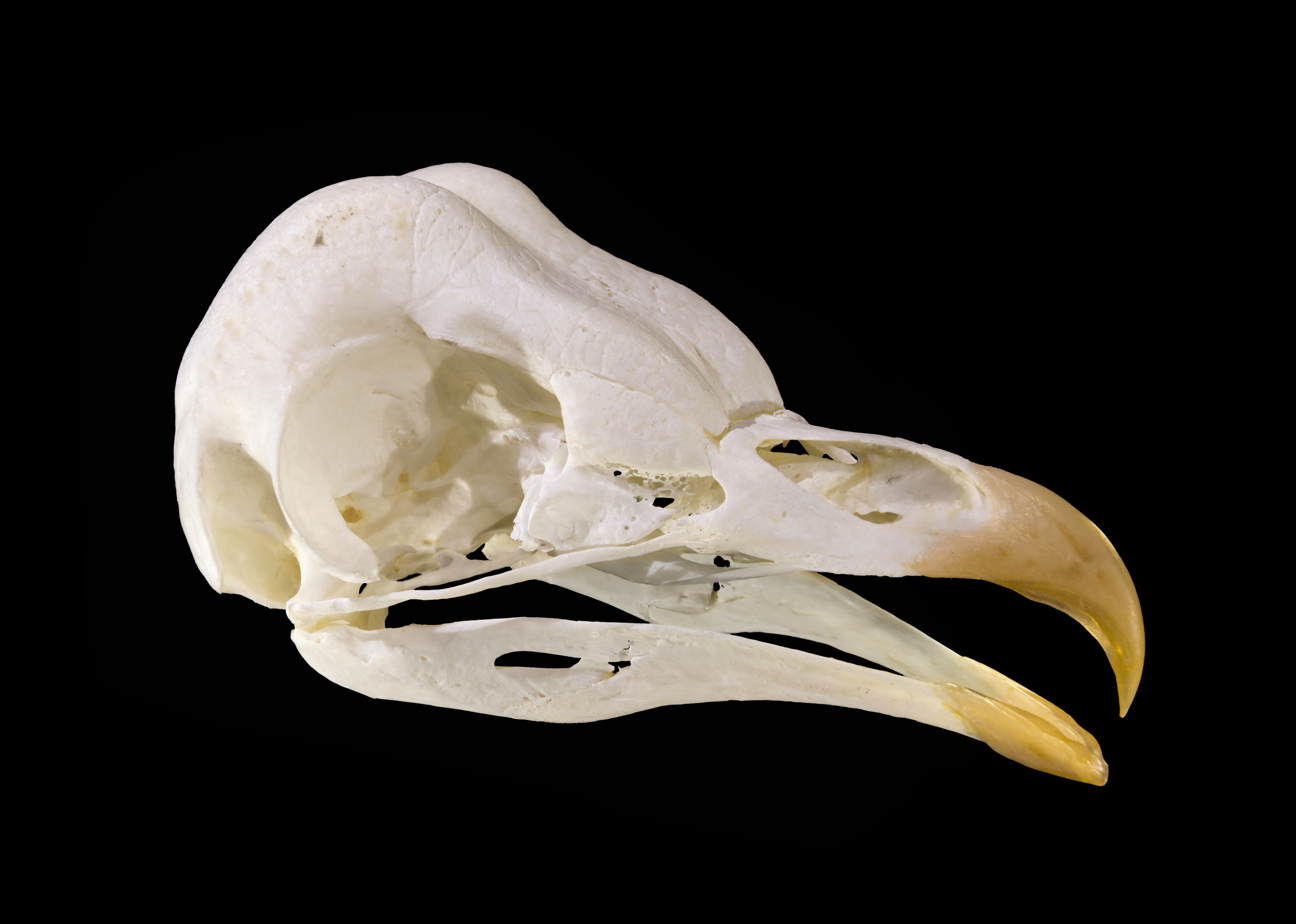
The bony core of the beak is a lightweight framework, as seen on this barn owl's skull.

Although beaks vary significantly in size and shape from species to species, their underlying structures have a similar pattern. All beaks are composed of two jaws, generally known as the maxilla (upper) and mandible (lower). The upper, and in some cases the lower, mandibles are strengthened internally by a complex three-dimensional network of bony spicules (or trabeculae) seated in soft connective tissue and surrounded by the hard outer layers of the beak. The avian jaw apparatus is made up of two units: one four-bar linkage mechanism and one five-bar linkage mechanism.

=== Mandibles ===
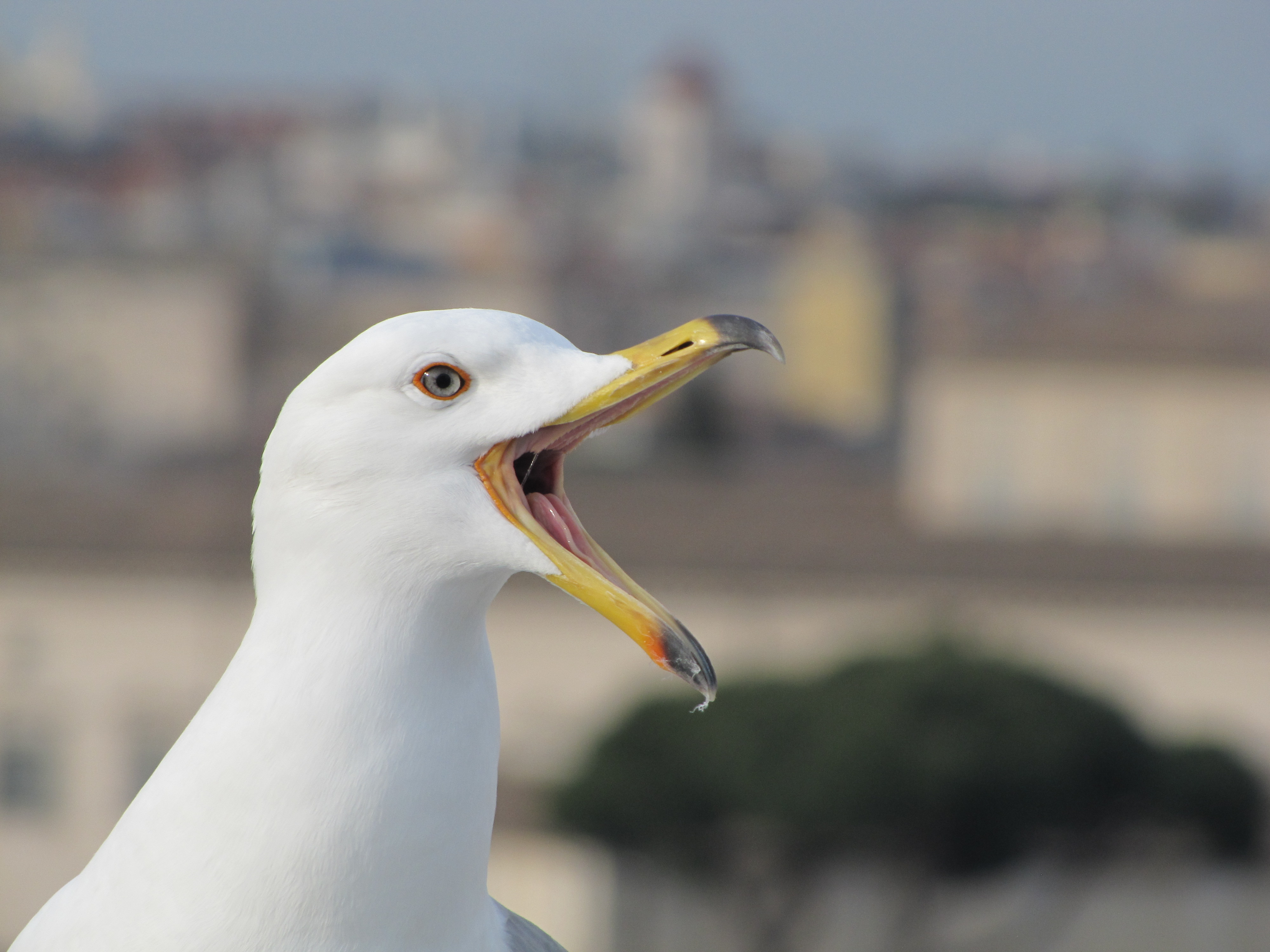
A gull's upper mandible can flex upwards because it is supported by small bones which can move slightly backwards and forwards.

The upper mandible is supported by a three-pronged bone called the intermaxillary. The upper prong of this bone is embedded into the forehead, while the two lower prongs attach to the sides of the skull. At the base of the upper mandible a thin sheet of nasal bones is attached to the skull at the nasofrontal hinge, which gives mobility to the upper mandible, allowing it to move upward and downward.

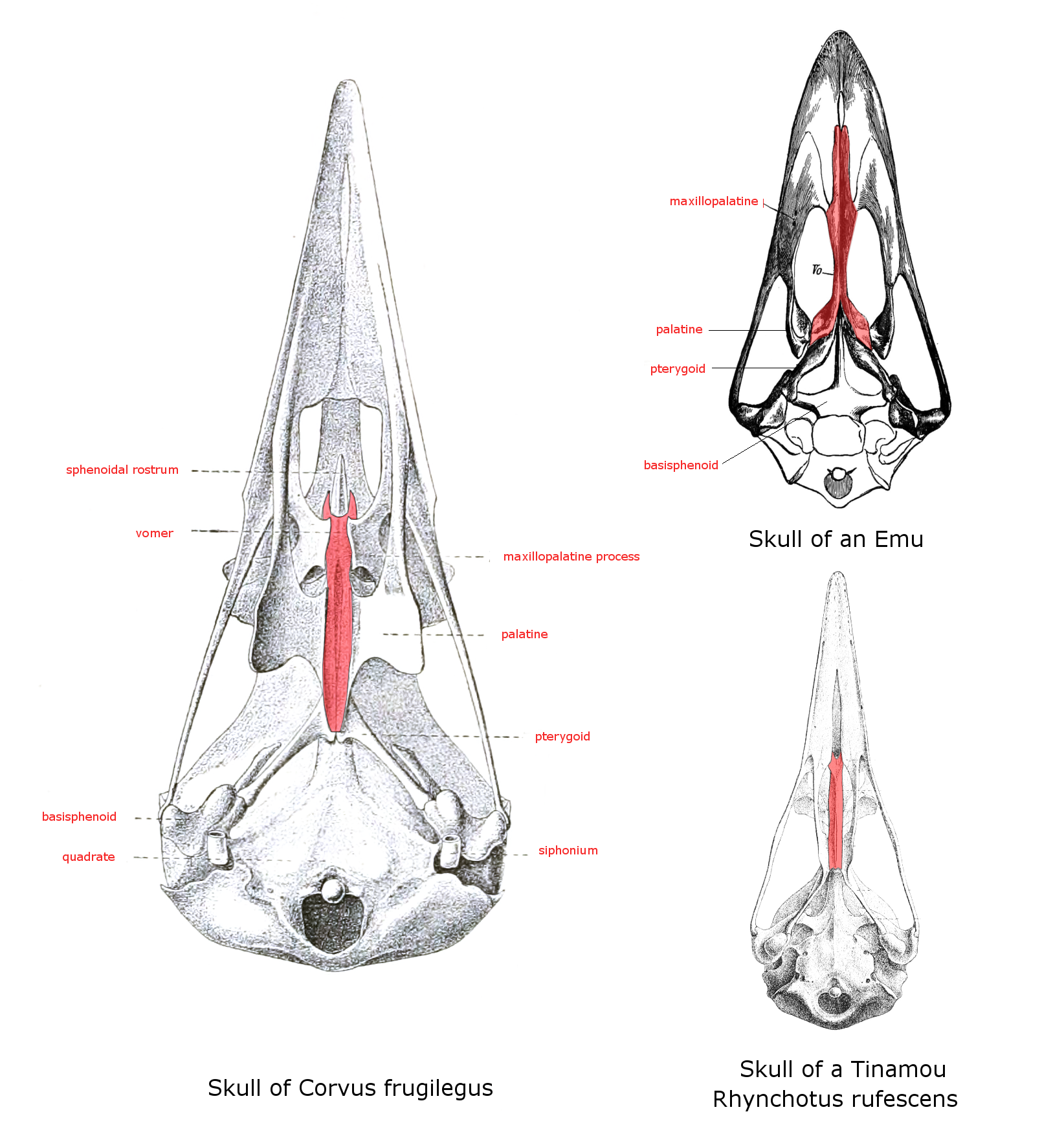
Position of vomer (shaded red) in neognathae (left) and paleognathae (right)

The base of the upper mandible, or the roof when seen from the mouth, is the palate; the palate's structure differs greatly in the ratites. Here, the vomer is large and connects with premaxillae and maxillopalatine bones in a condition termed as a "paleognathous palate". All other extant birds have a narrow forked vomer that does not connect with other bones and is then termed as neognathous. The shape of these bones varies across the bird families. (Note: For an explanation of desmognathous, aegithognathous, etc. with images see "Catalogue of Species". 1891 – via Archive.org..)

The lower mandible is supported by a bone known as the inferior maxillary bone—a compound bone composed of two distinct ossified pieces. These ossified plates (or rami), which can be U-shaped or V-shaped, join distally (the exact location of the joint depends on the species) but are separated proximally, attaching on either side of the head to the quadrate bone. The jaw muscles, which allow the bird to close its beak, attach to the proximal end of the lower mandible and to the bird's skull. The muscles that depress the lower mandible are usually weak, except in a few birds such as the starlings and the extinct huia, which have well-developed digastric muscles that aid in foraging by prying or gaping actions. In most birds, these muscles are relatively small as compared to the jaw muscles of similarly sized mammals.

=== Rhamphotheca ===
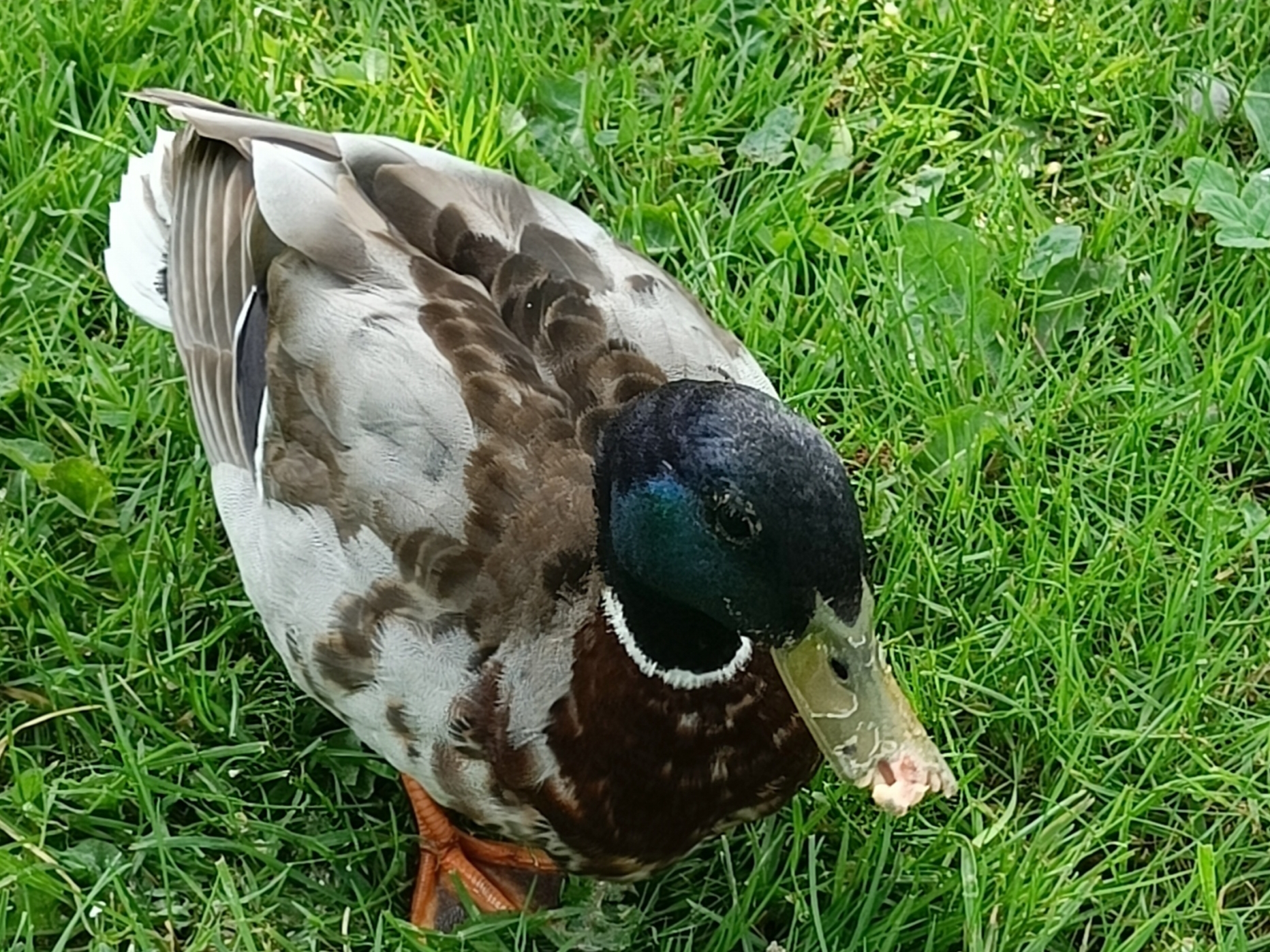
Mallard with an injured beak after a dog attack. Parts of the rhamphotheca have detached, exposing the periosteum.

The outer surface of the beak consists of a thin sheath of keratin called the rhamphotheca, which can be subdivided into the rhinotheca of the upper mandible and the gnathotheca of the lower mandible. The covering arises from the Malpighian layer of the bird's epidermis, growing from plates at the base of each mandible. There is a vascular layer between the rhamphotheca and the deeper layers of the dermis, which is attached directly to the periosteum of the bones of the beak. The rhamphotheca grows continuously in most birds, and in some species, the color varies seasonally. In some alcids, such as the puffins, parts of the rhamphotheca are shed each year after the breeding season, while some pelicans shed a part of the bill called a "bill horn" that develops in the breeding season.

While most extant birds have a single seamless rhamphotheca, species in a few families, including the albatrosses and the emu, have compound rhamphothecae that consist of several pieces separated and defined by softer keratinous grooves. Studies have shown that this was the primitive ancestral state of the rhamphotheca, and that the modern simple rhamphotheca resulted from the gradual loss of the defining grooves through evolution.

=== Tomia ===
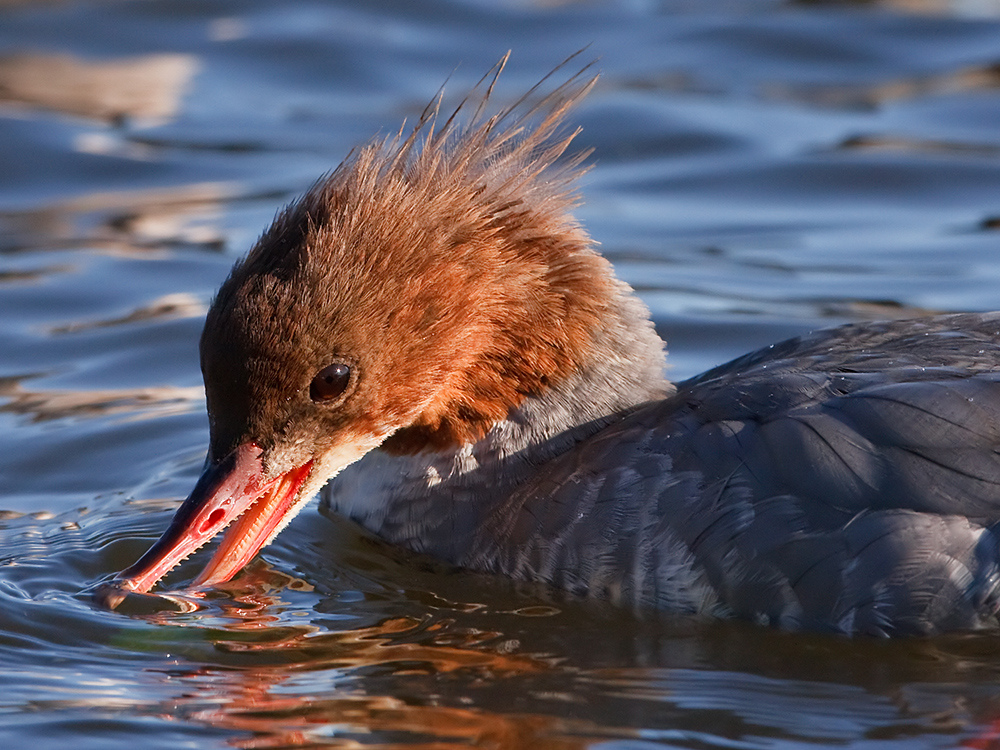
The sawtooth serrations on a common merganser's bill help it to hold tight to its prey, a fish.

The tomia (singular tomium) are the cutting edges of the two mandibles. In most birds, they range from being rounded to slightly sharp, but some species have evolved structural modifications that allow them to handle their typical food sources better. Granivorous (seed-eating) birds, for example, have ridges in their tomia, which help the bird to slice through a seed's outer hull. Most falcons have a sharp projection along the upper mandible, with a corresponding notch on the lower mandible. They use this "tooth" to sever their prey's vertebrae fatally or to rip insects apart. Some kites, principally those that prey on insects or lizards, also have one or more of these sharp projections, as do the shrikes. The tomial teeth of falcons are underlain by bone, while the shrike tomial teeth are entirely keratinous. Some fish-eating species, e.g., the mergansers, have sawtooth serrations along their tomia, which help them to keep hold of their slippery, wriggling prey.

Birds in roughly 30 families have tomia lined with tight bunches of very short bristles along their entire length. Most of these species are either insectivores (preferring hard-shelled prey) or snail eaters, and the brush-like projections may help to increase the coefficient of friction between the mandibles, thereby improving the bird's ability to hold hard prey items. Serrations on hummingbird bills, found in 23% of all hummingbird genera, may perform a similar function, allowing the birds to effectively hold insect prey. They may also allow shorter-billed hummingbirds to function as nectar thieves, as they can more effectively hold and cut through long or waxy flower corollas. In some cases, the color of a bird's tomia can help to distinguish between similar species. The snow goose, for example, has a reddish-pink bill with black tomia, while the whole beak of the similar Ross's goose is pinkish-red, without darker tomia.

=== Culmen ===
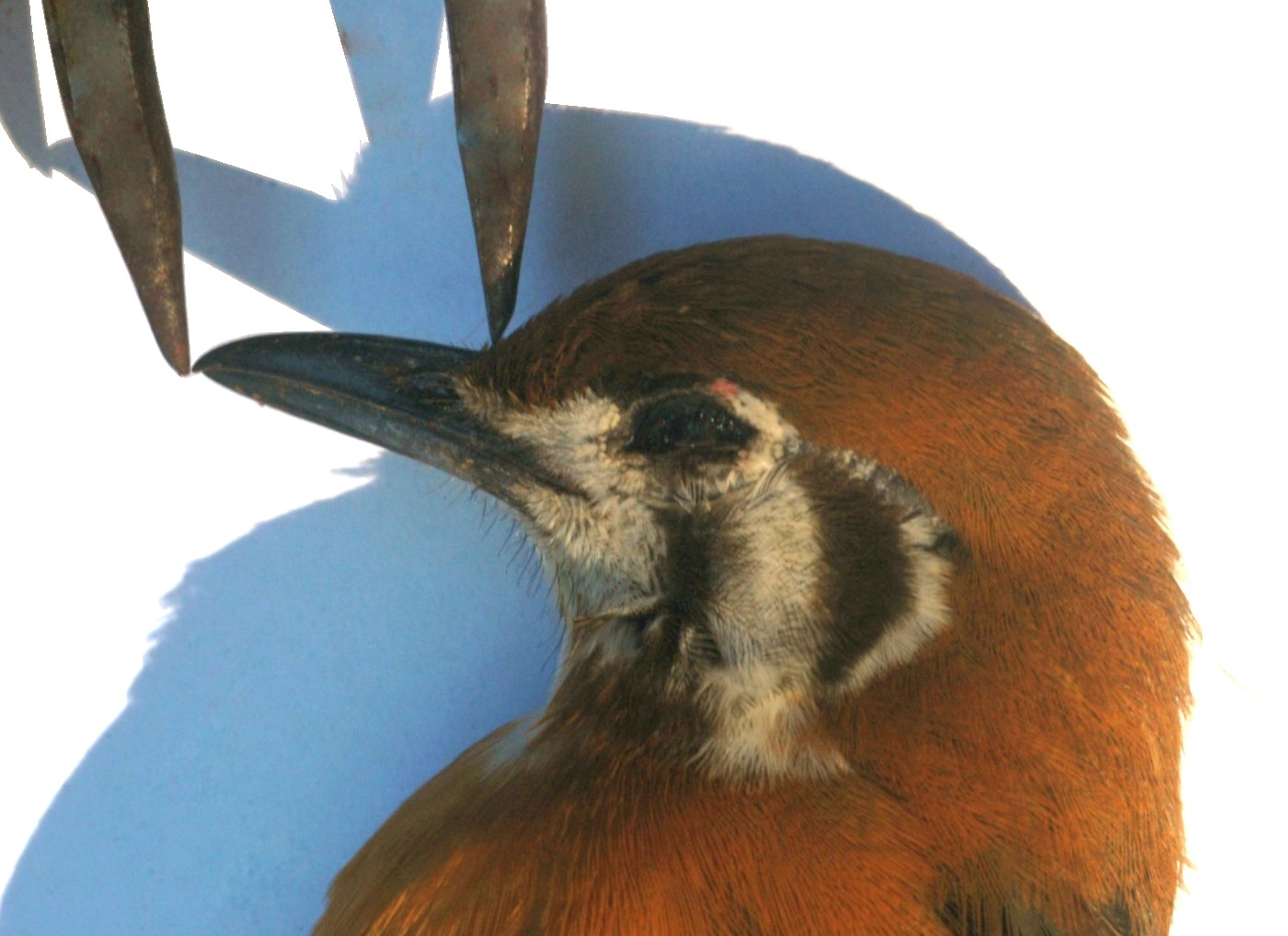
A bird's culmen is measured in a straight line from the tip of the beak to a set point—here, where the feathering starts on the bird's forehead.

The culmen is the dorsal ridge of the upper mandible. Likened by ornithologist E. Coues to the ridge line of a roof, it is the "highest middle lengthwise line of the bill" and runs from the point where the upper mandible emerges from the forehead's feathers to its tip. The bill's length along the culmen is one of the regular measurements made during bird banding (ringing) and is particularly useful in feeding studies. There are several standard measurements which can be made—from the beak's tip to the point where feathering starts on the forehead, from the tip to the anterior edge of the nostrils, from the tip to the base of the skull, or from the tip to the cere (for raptors and owls)—and scientists from various parts of the world generally favor one method over another. In all cases, these are chord measurements (measured in a straight line from point to point, ignoring any curve in the culmen) taken with calipers.

The shape or color of the culmen can also help with the identification of birds in the field. For example, the culmen of the parrot crossbill is strongly decurved, while that of the very similar red crossbill is more moderately curved. The culmen of a juvenile common loon is all dark, while that of the very similarly plumaged juvenile yellow-billed loon is pale towards the tip.

=== Gonys ===
The gonys is the ventral ridge of the lower mandible, created by the junction of the bone's two rami, or lateral plates. The proximal end of that junction—where the two plates separate—is known as the gonydeal angle or gonydeal expansion. In some gull species, the plates expand slightly at that point, creating a noticeable bulge; the size and shape of the gonydeal angle can be useful in identifying between otherwise similar species. Adults of many species of large gulls have a reddish or orangish gonydeal spot near the gonydeal expansion. This spot triggers begging behavior in gull chicks. The chick pecks at the spot on its parent's bill, which in turn stimulates the parent to regurgitate food.

=== Commissure ===
Depending on its use, commissure may refer to the junction of the upper and lower mandibles, or alternately, to the full-length apposition of the closed mandibles, from the corners of the mouth to the tip of the beak.

=== Gape ===
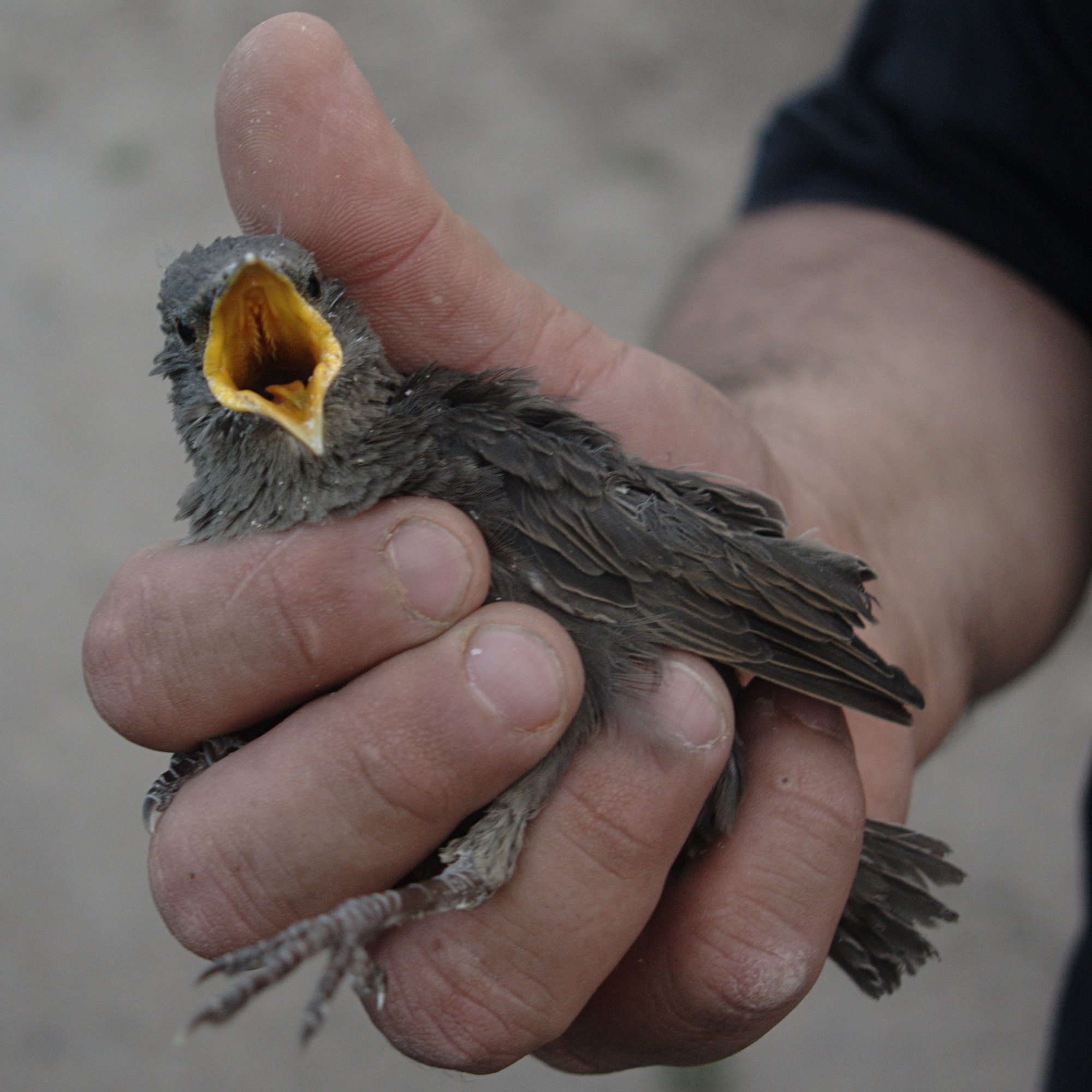
The gapes of juvenile altricial birds are often brightly colored, as in this common starling.

In bird anatomy, the gape is the interior of the open mouth of a bird, and the gape flange is the region where the two mandibles join together at the base of the beak. The width of the gape can be a factor in the choice of food.

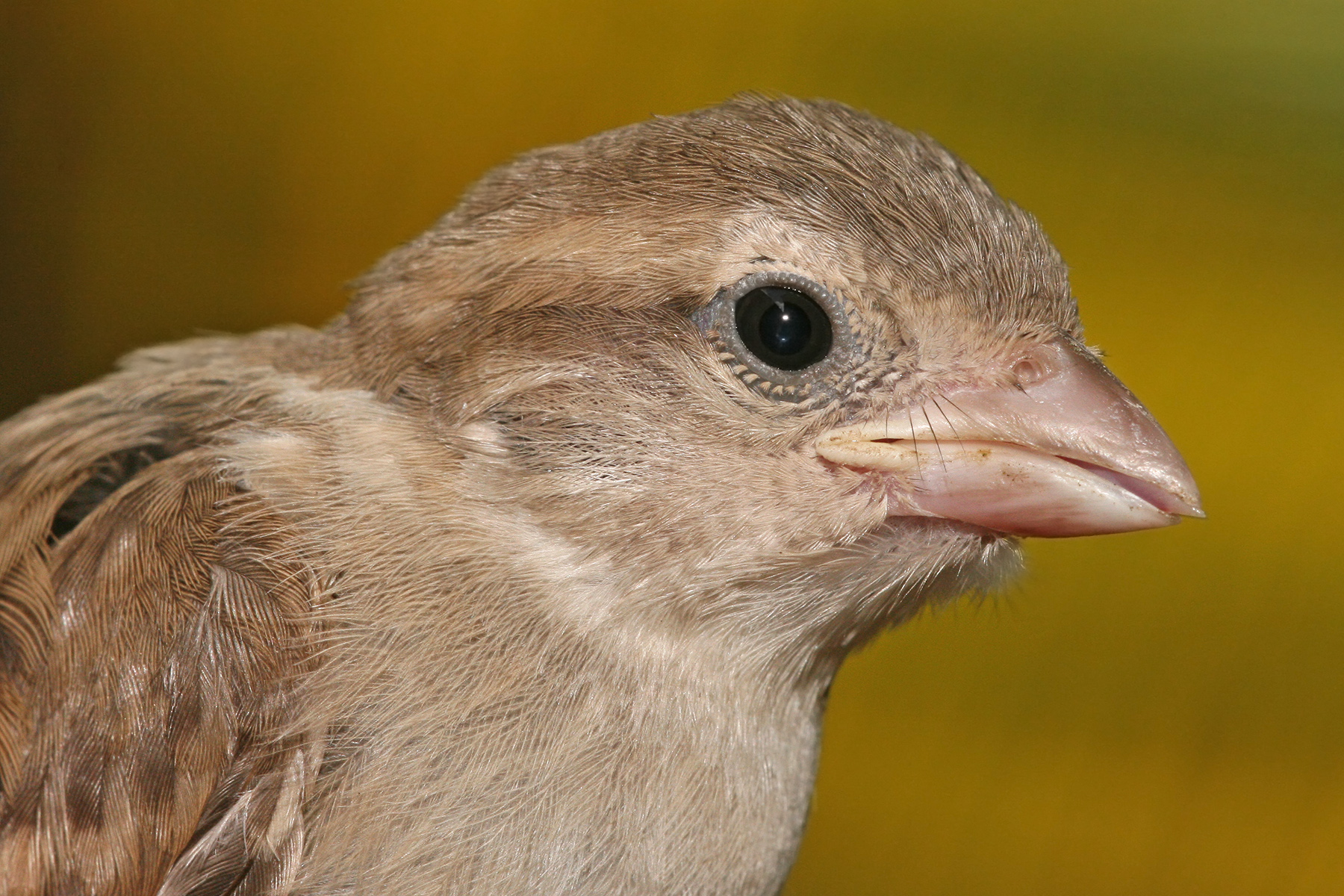
The gape flange on this juvenile house sparrow is the yellowish region at the base of the beak.

Gapes of juvenile altricial birds are often brightly coloured, sometimes with contrasting spots or other patterns, and these are believed to be an indication of their health, fitness and competitive ability. Based on that, the parents decide how to distribute food among the chicks in the nest. Some species, especially in the families Viduidae and Estrildidae, have bright spots on the gape known as gape tubercles or gape papillae. These nodular spots are conspicuous even in low light. A study examining the nestling gapes of eight passerine species found that the gapes were conspicuous in the ultraviolet spectrum (visible to birds but not to humans). Parents may, however, not rely solely on the gape coloration, and other factors influencing their decision remain unknown.

Red gape color has been shown in several experiments to induce feeding. An experiment in manipulating brood size and immune system with barn swallow nestlings showed the vividness of the gape was positively correlated with T-cell–mediated immunocompetence, and that larger brood size and injection with an antigen led to a less vivid gape. Conversely, the red gape of the common cuckoo (Cuculus canorus) did not induce extra feeding in host parents. Some brood parasites, such as the Hodgson's hawk-cuckoo (C. fugax), have colored patches on the wing that mimic the gape color of the parasitized species.

When born, the chick's gape flanges are fleshy. As it grows into a fledgling, the gape flanges remain somewhat swollen and can thus be used to recognize that a particular bird is young. By the time it reaches adulthood, the gape flanges will no longer be visible.

=== Nares ===
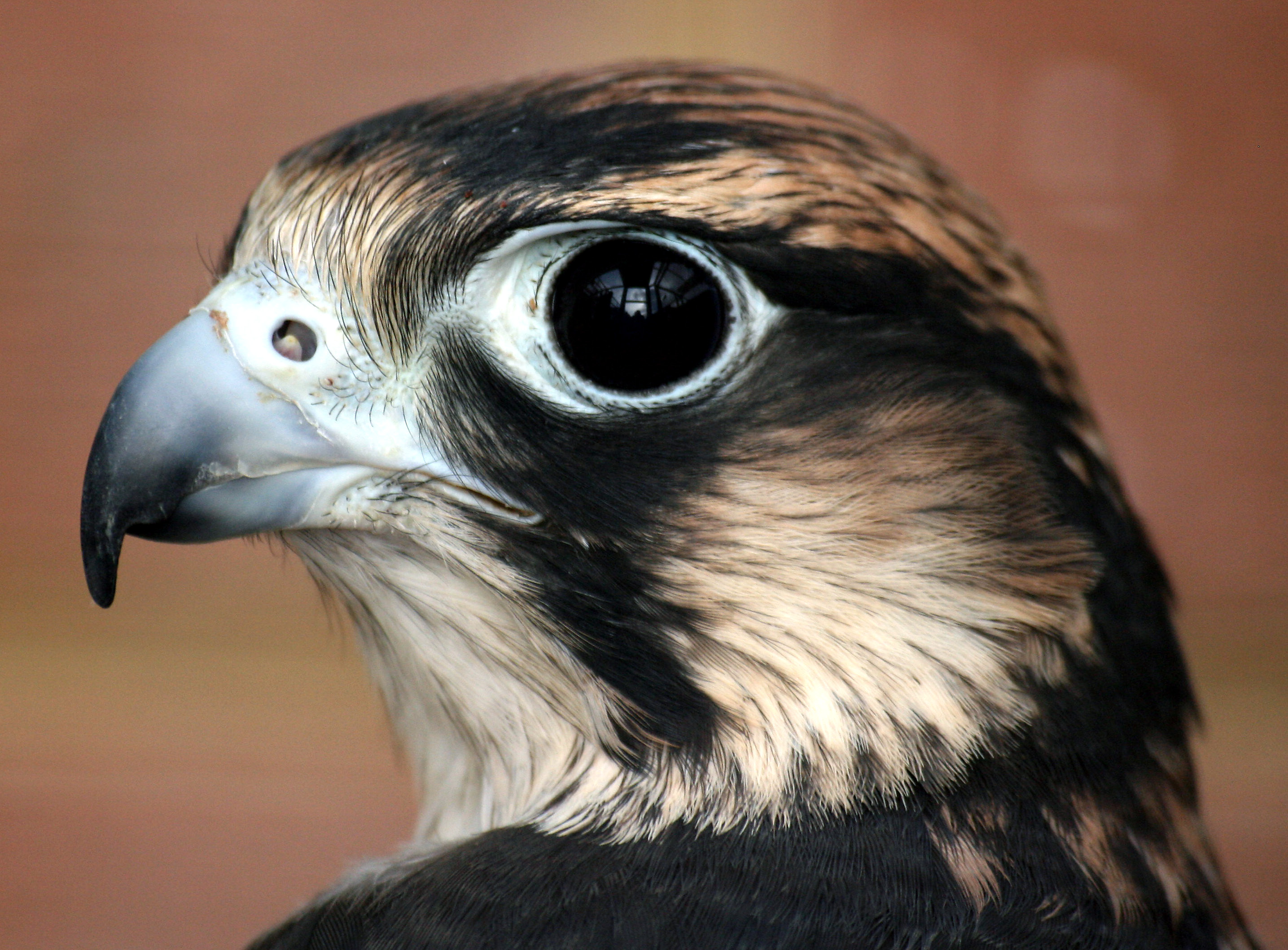
Falcons have a small tubercule within each naris.

Most species of birds have external nares (nostrils) located somewhere on their beak. The nares are two holes—circular, oval or slit-like in shape—which lead to the nasal cavities within the bird's skull, and thus to the rest of the respiratory system. In most bird species, the nares are located in the basal third of the upper mandible. Kiwis are a notable exception; their nares are located at the tip of their bills. A handful of species have no external nares. Cormorants and darters have primitive external nares as nestlings, but these close soon after the birds fledge; adults of these species (and gannets and boobies of all ages, which also lack external nostrils) breathe through their mouths. There is typically a septum made of bone or cartilage that separates the two nares, but in some families (including gulls, cranes, and New World vultures), the septum is missing. While the nares are uncovered in most species, they are covered with feathers in a few groups of birds, including grouse and ptarmigans, crows, and some woodpeckers. The feathers over a ptarmigan's nostrils help to warm the air it inhales, while those over a woodpecker's nares help to keep wood particles from clogging its nasal passages.

Species in the bird order Procellariiformes have nostrils enclosed in double tubes which sit atop or along the sides of the upper mandible. These species, which include the albatrosses, petrels, diving petrels, storm petrels, fulmars and shearwaters, are widely known as "tubenoses". A number of species, including the falcons, have a small bony tubercule which projects from their nares. The function of the tubercule is unknown. Some scientists suggest it acts as a baffle, slowing down or diffusing airflow into the nares (thus allowing the bird to continue breathing without damaging its respiratory system) during high-speed dives, but this theory has not been proved experimentally. Not all species which fly at high speeds have these tubercules, while some species which fly at low speeds have them.

=== Operculum ===
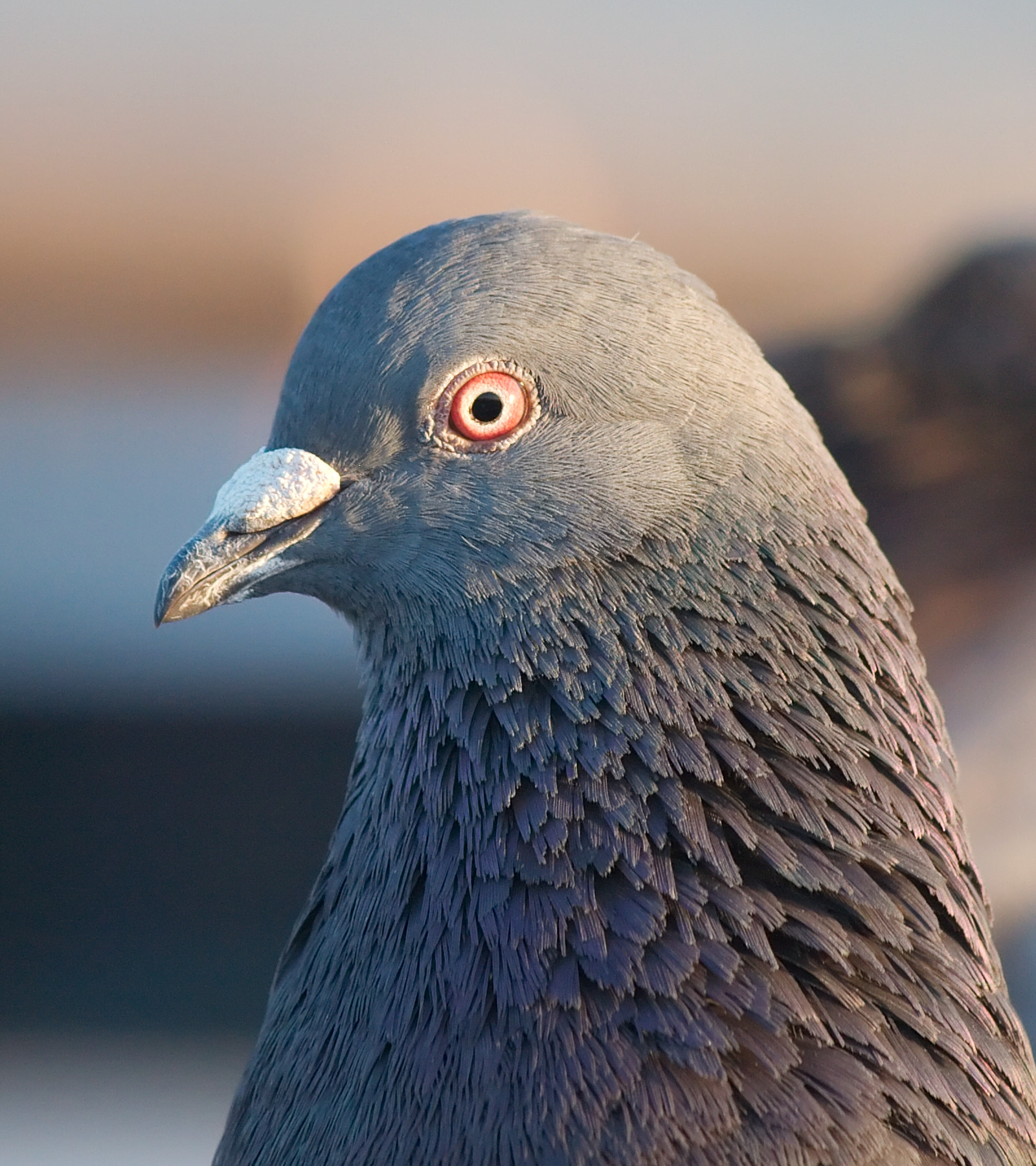
The rock dove's operculum is a mass at the base of the bill.

The nares of some birds are covered by an operculum (plural opercula), a membraneous, horny or cartilaginous flap. In diving birds, the operculum keeps water out of the nasal cavity; when the birds dive, the impact force of the water closes the operculum. Some species which feed on flowers have opercula to help to keep pollen from clogging their nasal passages, while the opercula of the two species of Attagis seedsnipe help to keep dust out. The nares of nestling tawny frogmouths are covered with large dome-shaped opercula, which help to reduce the rapid evaporation of water vapor, and may also help to increase condensation within the nostrils themselves—both critical functions, since the nestlings get fluids only from the food their parents bring them. The opercula shrink as the birds age, disappearing completely by the time they reach adulthood. In pigeons, the operculum has evolved into a soft swollen mass that sits at the base of the bill, above the nares; though it is sometimes referred to as the cere, this is a different structure. Tapaculos are the only birds known to have the ability to move their opercula.

=== Rosette ===
Some species like the puffin, have a fleshy rosette, sometimes called a "gape rosette" at the corners of the beak. In the puffin, it is grown as part of its display plumage.

=== Cere ===
Birds from a handful of families—including raptors, owls, skuas, parrots, pigeons, turkeys and curassows—have a waxy structure called a cere (from the Latin cera, which means "wax") or ceroma which covers the base of their bill. This structure typically contains the nares, except in the owls, where the nares are distal to the cere. Although it is sometimes feathered in parrots, the cere is typically bare and often brightly colored. In raptors, the cere is a sexual signal which indicates the "quality" of a bird; the orangeness of a Montagu's harrier's cere, for example, correlates to its body mass and physical condition. The cere color of young Eurasian scops-owls has an ultraviolet (UV) component, with a UV peak that correlates to the bird's mass. A chick with a lower body mass has a UV peak at a higher wavelength than a chick with a higher body mass does. Studies have shown that parent owls preferentially feed chicks with ceres that show higher wavelength UV peaks, that is, lighter-weight chicks.

The color or appearance of the cere can be used to distinguish between males and females in some species. For example, the male great curassow has a yellow cere, which the female (and young males) lack. The male budgerigar's cere is royal blue, while the female's is a very pale blue, white, or brown.

=== Nail ===
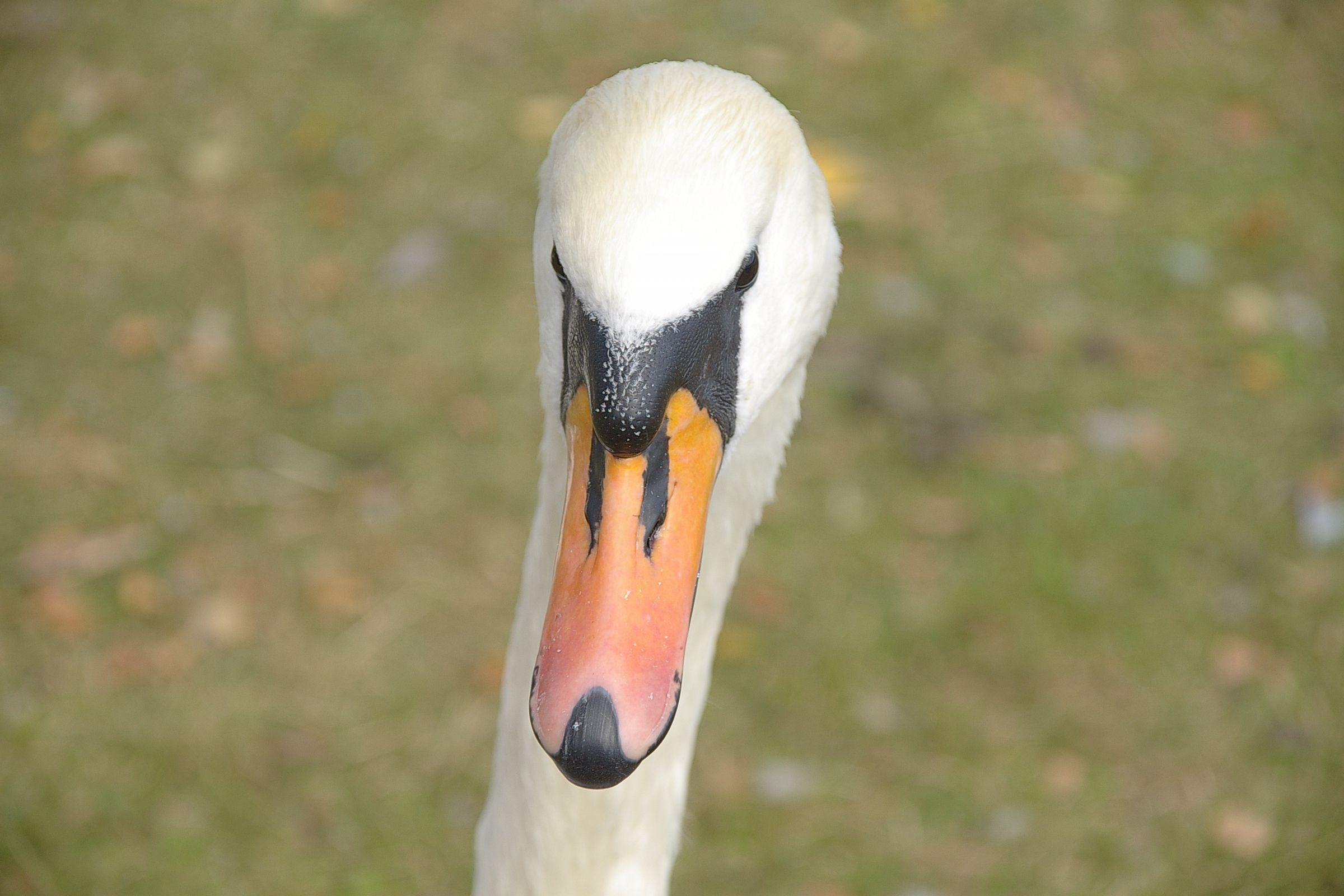
The black tip of this mute swan's beak is its nail.

All birds of the family Anatidae (ducks, geese, and swans) have a nail, a plate of hard horny tissue at the tip of the beak. The shield-shaped structure, which sometimes spans the entire width of the beak, is often bent at the tip to form a hook. It serves different purposes depending on the bird's primary food source. Most species use their nails to dig seeds out of mud or vegetation, while diving ducks use theirs to pry molluscs from rocks. There is evidence that the nail may help a bird to grasp objects. Species which use strong grasping motions to secure their food (such as when catching and holding onto a large squirming frog) have very wide nails. Certain types of mechanoreceptors, nerve cells that are sensitive to pressure, vibration, or touch, are located under the nail.

The shape or color of the nail can sometimes be used to help distinguish between similar-looking species or between various ages of waterfowl. For example, the greater scaup has a wider black nail than does the very similar lesser scaup. Juvenile "grey geese" have dark nails, while most adults have pale nails. The nail gave the wildfowl family one of its former names: "Unguirostres" comes from the Latin ungus, meaning "nail" and rostrum, meaning "beak".

=== Rictal bristles ===
Rictal bristles are stiff hair-like feathers that arise around the base of the beak. They are common among insectivorous birds, but are also found in some non-insectivorous species. Their function is uncertain, although several possibilities have been proposed. They may function as a "net", helping in the capture of flying prey, although to date, there has been no empirical evidence to support this idea. There is some experimental evidence to suggest that they may prevent particles from striking the eyes if, for example, a prey item is missed or broken apart on contact. They may also help to protect the eyes from particles encountered in flight, or from casual contact from vegetation. There is also evidence that the rictal bristles of some species may function tactilely, in a manner similar to that of mammalian whiskers (vibrissae). Studies have shown that Herbst corpuscles, mechanoreceptors sensitive to pressure and vibration, are found in association with rictal bristles. They may help with prey detection, with navigation in darkened nest cavities, with the gathering of information during flight or with prey handling.

== Egg tooth ==
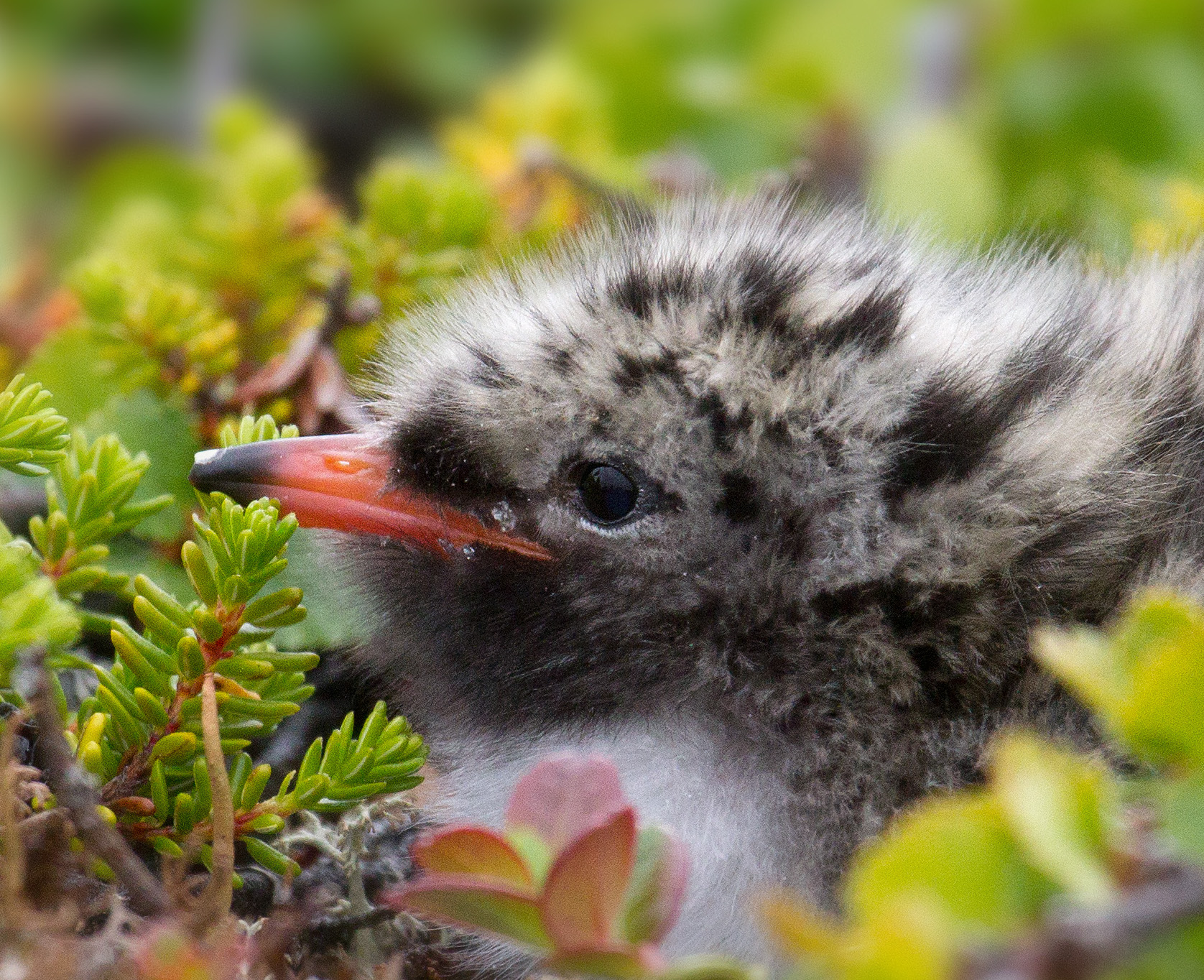
This Arctic tern chick still has its egg tooth, the small white projection near the tip of its upper mandible.

Full-term chicks of most bird species have a small sharp, calcified projection on their beak, which they use to chip their way out of their egg. Commonly known as an egg tooth, this white spike is generally near the tip of the upper mandible, though some species have one near the tip of their lower mandible instead, and a few species have one on each mandible. Despite its name, the projection is not an actual tooth, as the similarly-named projections of some reptiles are; instead, it is part of the integumentary system, as are claws and scales. The hatching chick first uses its egg tooth to break the membrane around an air chamber at the wide end of the egg. Then it pecks at the eggshell while turning slowly within the egg, eventually (over a period of hours or days) creating a series of small circular fractures in the shell. Once it has breached the egg's surface, the chick continues to chip at it until it has made a large hole. The weakened egg eventually shatters under the pressure of the bird's movements.

The egg tooth is so critical to a successful escape from the egg that chicks of most species will perish unhatched if they fail to develop one. However, there are a few species which do not have egg teeth. Megapode chicks have an egg tooth while still in the egg but lose it before hatching, while kiwi chicks never develop one; chicks of both families escape their eggs by kicking their way out. Most chicks lose their egg teeth within a few days of hatching, although petrels keep theirs for nearly three weeks and marbled murrelets have theirs for up to a month. Generally, the egg tooth drops off, though in songbirds it is resorbed.

== Color ==
The color of a bird's beak results from concentrations of pigments—primarily melanins and carotenoids—in the epidermal layers, including the rhamphotheca. Eumelanin, which is found in the bare parts of many bird species, is responsible for all shades of gray and black; the denser the deposits of pigment found in the epidermis, the darker the resulting color. Phaeomelanin produces "earth tones" ranging from gold and rufous to various shades of brown. Although it is thought to occur in combination with eumelanin in beaks which are buff, tan, or horn-colored, researchers have yet to isolate phaeomelanin from any beak structure. More than a dozen types of carotenoids are responsible for the coloration of most red, orange, and yellow beaks.

The hue of the color is determined by the precise mix of red and yellow pigments, while the saturation is determined by the density of the deposited pigments. For example, bright red is created by dense deposits of mostly red pigments, while dull yellow is created by diffuse deposits of mostly yellow pigments. Bright orange is created by dense deposits of both red and yellow pigments, in roughly equal concentrations. Beak coloration helps to make displays using those beaks more obvious. In general, beak color depends on a combination of the bird's hormonal state and diet. Colors are typically brightest as the breeding season approaches, and palest after breeding.

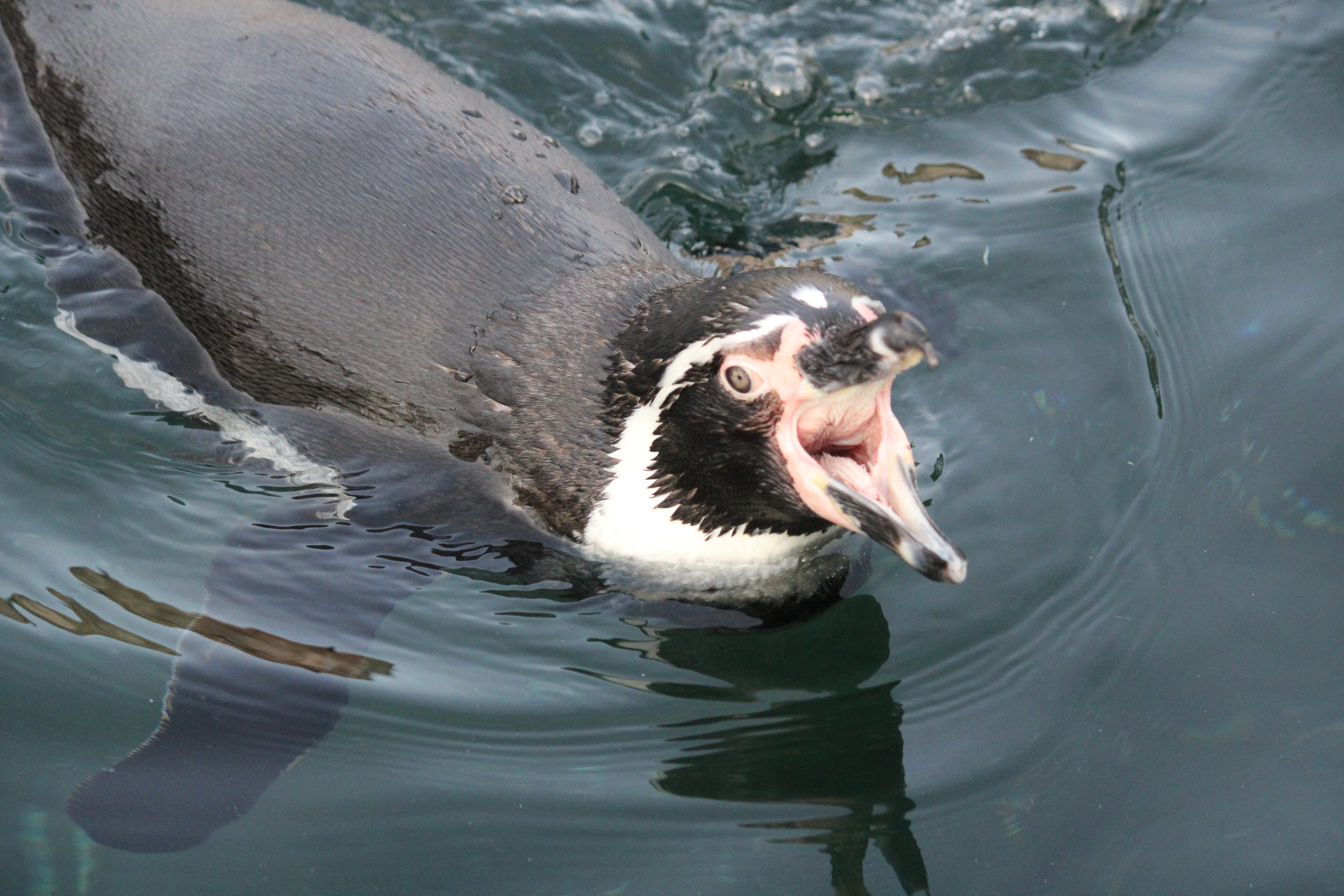
A humboldt penguin with open beak at Copenhagen Zoo, Denmark

Birds are capable of seeing colors in the ultraviolet range, and some species are known to have ultraviolet peaks of reflectance (indicating the presence of ultraviolet color) on their beaks. The presence and intensity of these peaks may indicate a bird's fitness, sexual maturity or pair bond status. King and emperor penguins, for example, show spots of ultraviolet reflectance only as adults. These spots are brighter on paired birds than on courting birds. The position of such spots on the beak may be important in allowing birds to identify conspecifics. For instance, the very similarly-plumaged king and emperor penguins have UV-reflective spots in different positions on their beaks.

== Dimorphism ==
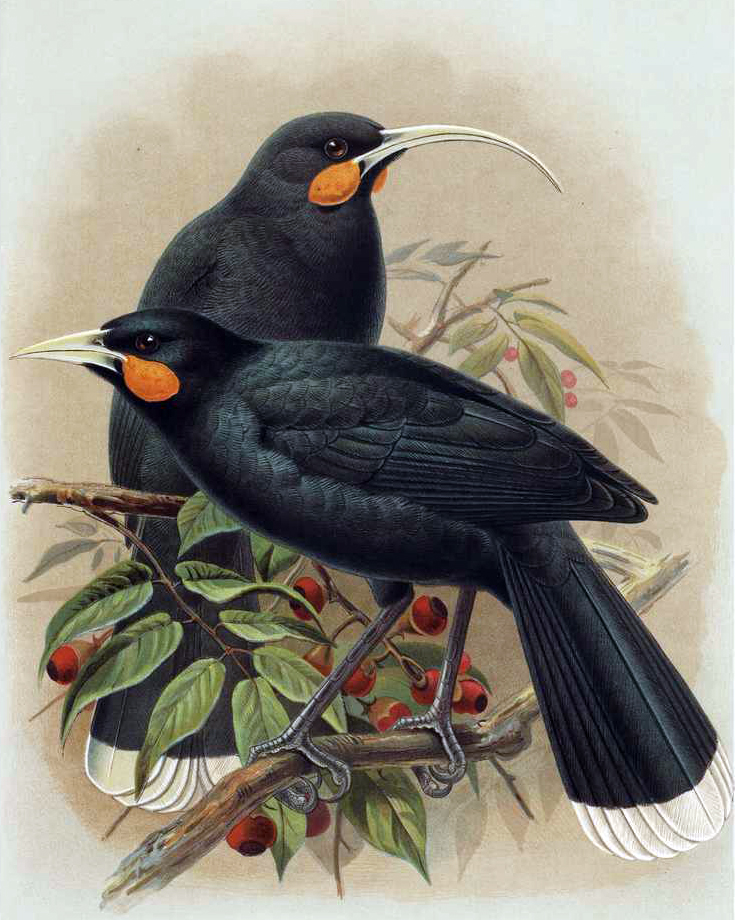
The beaks of the now-extinct huia (female upper, male lower) show they had marked sexual dimorphism.

The size and shape of the beak can vary across species as well as between them; in some species, the size and proportions of the beak vary between males and females. That allows the sexes to utilize different ecological niches, thereby reducing intraspecific competition. For example, females of nearly all shorebirds have longer bills than males of the same species, and female American avocets have beaks which are slightly more upturned than those of males. Males of the larger gull species have bigger, stouter beaks than those of females of the same species, and immatures can have smaller, more slender beaks than those of adults. Many hornbills show sexual dimorphism in the size and shape of both beaks and casques, and the female huia's slim, decurved bill was nearly twice as long as the male's straight, thicker one.

Color can also differ between sexes or ages within a species. Typically, such a color difference is due to the presence of androgens. For example, in house sparrows, melanins are produced only in the presence of testosterone; castrated male house sparrows—like female house sparrows—have brown beaks. Castration also prevents the normal seasonal color change in the beaks of male black-headed gulls and indigo buntings.

== Development ==
The beak of modern birds has a fused premaxillary bone, which is modulated by the expression of Fgf8 gene in the frontonasal ectodermal zone during embryonic development.

The shape of the beak is determined by two modules: the prenasal cartilage during early embryonic stage and the premaxillary bone during later stages. Development of the prenasal cartilage is regulated by genes Bmp4 and CaM, while that of the premaxillary bone is controlled by TGFβllr, β-catenin, and Dickkopf-3. TGFβllr codes for a serine/threonine protein kinase that regulates gene transcription upon ligand binding; previous work has highlighted its role in mammalian craniofacial skeletal development. β-catenin is involved in the differentiation of terminal bone cells. Dickkopf-3 codes for a secreted protein also known to be expressed in mammalian craniofacial development. The combination of these signals determines beak growth along the length, depth, and width axes. Reduced expression of TGFβllr significantly decreased the depth and length of chicken embryonic beak due to the underdevelopment of the premaxillary bone. Contrarily, an increase in Bmp4 signaling would result in a reduced premaxillary bone due to the overdevelopment of the prenasal cartilage, which takes up more mesenchymal cells for cartilage, instead of bone, formation.

== Functions ==
Three barn owls threatening an intruder; barn owl threat displays usually include hissing and bill-snapping, as shown here

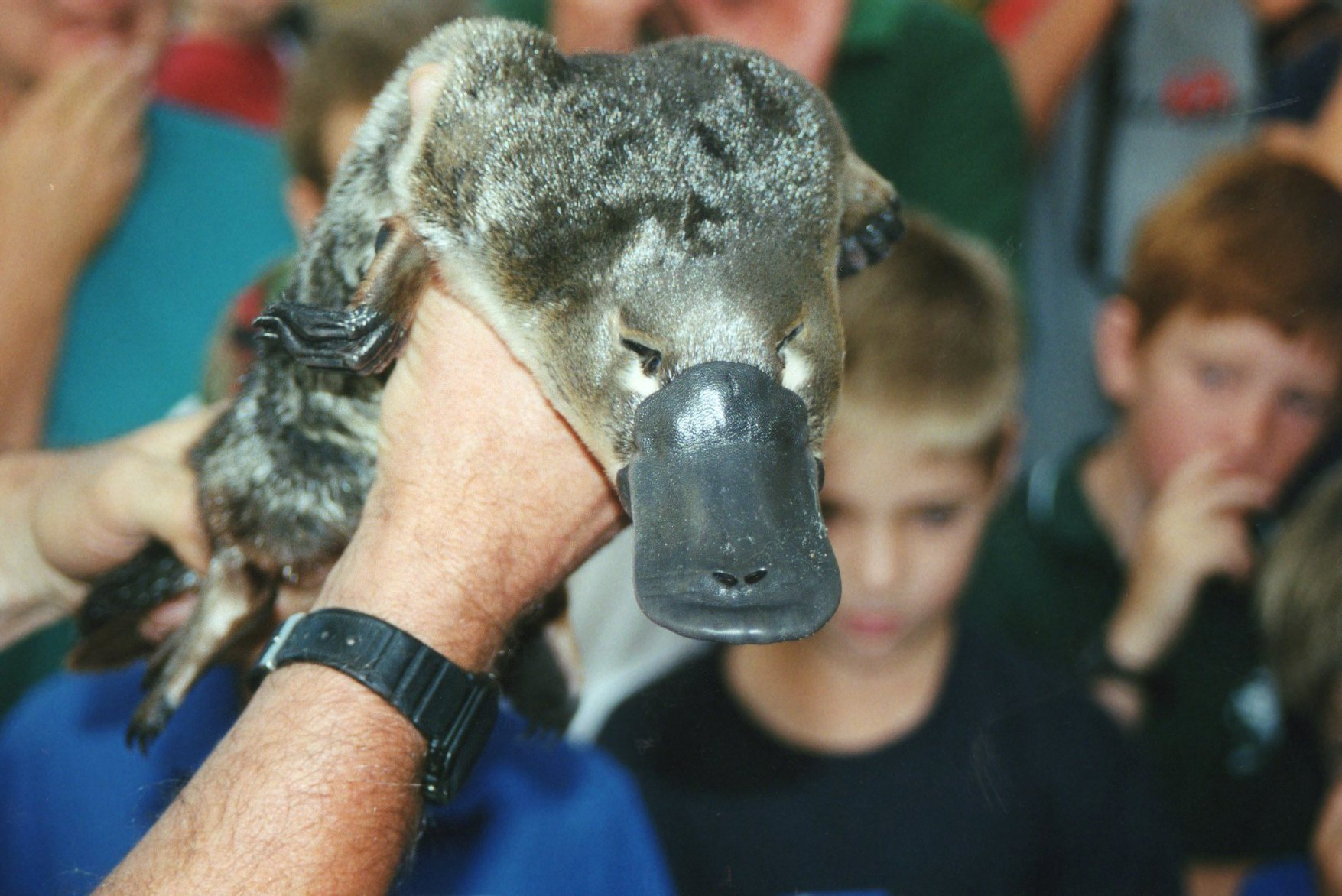
The platypus uses its bill to navigate underwater, detect food, and dig. The bill contains receptors which help detect prey.

=== Eating ===
Different species' beaks have evolved according to their diet; for example, raptors have sharp-pointed beaks that facilitate dissection and biting off of prey animals' tissue, whereas passerine birds that specialize in eating seeds with especially tough shells (such as grosbeaks and cardinals) have large, stout beaks with high compressive power. Diving or fishing birds have beaks adapted for those pursuits; for example, kingfishers have long, pointed beaks adapted for diving into water, while pelicans' beaks are adapted for scooping up and swallowing fish whole. Woodpeckers have thick, pointed beaks adapted for pecking apart wood while hunting for arthropods and insect larvae.

=== Self-defensive pecking ===
Birds may bite or stab with their beaks to defend themselves.

=== Displays (for courtship, territoriality, or deterrence) ===
Some species use their beaks in displays of various sorts. As part of his courtship, for example, the male garganey touches his beak to the blue speculum feathers on his wings in a fake preening display, and the male mandarin duck does the same with his orange sail feathers. A number of species use a gaping, open beak in their fear and/or threat displays. Some augment the display by hissing or breathing heavily, while others clap their beaks. Red-bellied woodpeckers at bird feeders are known to wave their beaks at competing birds who get too close.

=== Sensory detection ===
The platypus uses its bill to navigate underwater, detect food, and dig. The bill contains electroreceptors and mechanoreceptors, causing muscular contractions to help detect prey. It is one of the few species of mammals to use electroreception. The beaks of Kiwis, Ibises, and sandpipers have sensory pits in their beaks that allow them to sense vibrations.

The beaks of aquatic birds contain Grandry corpuscles, which assist in velocity detection while filter feeding.

=== Preening ===
The beak of birds plays a role in removing skin parasites (ectoparasites) such as lice. It is mainly the tip of the beak that does this. Studies have shown that inserting a bit to stop birds from using the tip results in increased parasite loads in pigeons. Birds that have naturally deformed beaks have also been noted to have higher levels of parasites. It is thought that the overhang at the end of the top portion of the beak (that is the portion that begins to curve downwards) slides against the lower beak to crush parasites.

This overhang of the beak is thought to be under stabilising natural selection. Very long beaks are thought to be selected against because they are prone to a higher number of breaks, as has been demonstrated in rock pigeons. Beaks with no overhang would be unable to effectively remove and kill ectoparasites as mentioned above. Studies have supported there is a selection pressure for an intermediate amount of overhang. Western scrub jays who had more symmetrical bills (i.e. those with less of an overhang), were found to have higher amounts of lice when tested. The same pattern has been found in surveys of Peruvian birds.

Additionally because of the role beaks play in preening, this is evidence for coevolution of the beak overhang morphology and body morphology of parasites. Artificially removing the ability to preen in birds, followed by readdition of preening ability was shown to result in changes in body size in lice. Once the ability of the birds to preen was reintroduced, the lice were found to show declines in body size suggesting they may evolve in response to preening pressures from birds who could respond in turn with changes in beak morphology.

=== Communicative percussion ===
A number of species, including storks, some owls, frogmouths and the noisy miner, use bill clapping as a form of communication. Some woodpecker species are known to use percussion as a courtship activity, whereas males get the (aural) attention of females from a distance and then impress them with the sound volume and pattern. This explains why humans are sometimes inconvenienced by pecking that clearly has no feeding purpose (such as when the bird pecks on chimneys or sheet metal).

=== Heat exchange ===
Studies have shown that some birds use their beaks to rid themselves of excess heat. The toco toucan, which has the largest beak relative to the size of its body of any bird species, is capable of modifying the blood flow to its beak. This process allows the beak to work as a "transient thermal radiator", reportedly rivaling an elephant's ears in its ability to radiate body heat.

Measurements of the bill sizes of several species of American sparrows found in salt marshes along the North American coastlines show a strong correlation with summer temperatures recorded in the locations where the sparrows breed; latitude alone showed a much weaker correlation. By dumping excess heat through their bills, the sparrows are able to avoid the water loss which would be required by evaporative cooling—an important benefit in a windy habitat where freshwater is scarce. Several ratites, including the common ostrich, the emu and the southern cassowary, use various bare parts of their bodies (including their beaks) to dissipate as much as 40% of their metabolic heat production. Alternately, studies have shown that birds from colder climates (higher altitudes or latitudes and lower environmental temperatures) have smaller beaks, lessening heat loss from that structure.

== Billing ==
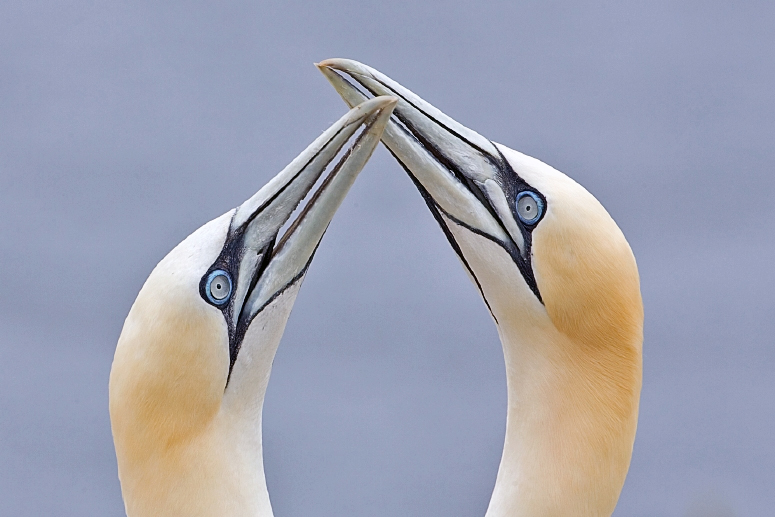
When billing, northern gannets raise their beaks high and clatter them against each other.

During courtship, mated pairs of many bird species touch or clasp each other's bills. Termed billing (also nebbing in British English), this behavior appears to strengthen pair bonding. The amount of contact involved varies among species. Some gently touch only a part of their partner's beak while others clash their beaks vigorously together.

Gannets raise their bills high and repeatedly clatter them, the male puffin nibbles at the female's beak, the male waxwing puts his bill in the female's mouth and ravens hold each other's beaks in a prolonged "kiss". Billing can also be used as a gesture of appeasement or subordination. Subordinate Canada jay routinely bill more dominant birds, lowering their body and quivering their wings in the manner of a young bird begging for food as they do so. A number of parasites, including rhinonyssids and Trichomonas gallinae are known to be transferred between birds during episodes of billing.

Use of the term extends beyond avian behavior; "billing and cooing" in reference to human courtship (particularly kissing) has been in use since Shakespeare's time, and derives from the courtship of doves.

== Beak trimming ==
Because the beak is a sensitive organ with many sensory receptors, beak trimming (sometimes referred to as 'debeaking') is "acutely painful" to the birds it is performed on. It is nonetheless routinely done to intensively farmed poultry flocks, particularly laying and broiler breeder flocks, because it helps reduce the damage the flocks inflict on themselves due to a number of stress-induced behaviors, including cannibalism, vent pecking and feather pecking. A cauterizing blade or infrared beam is used to cut off about half of the upper beak and about a third of the lower beak. Pain and sensitivity can persist for weeks or months after the procedure, and neuromas can form along the cut edges. Food intake typically decreases for some period after the beak is trimmed. However, studies show that trimmed poultry's adrenal glands weigh less, and their plasma corticosterone levels are lower than those found in untrimmed poultry, indicating that they are less stressed overall.

A similar but separate practice, usually performed by an avian veterinarian or an experienced birdkeeper, involves clipping, filing or sanding the beaks of captive birds for health purposes–in order to correct or temporarily alleviate overgrowths or deformities and better allow the bird to go about its normal feeding and preening activities.

Among raptor keepers, the practice is commonly known as "coping".

== Bill tip organ ==
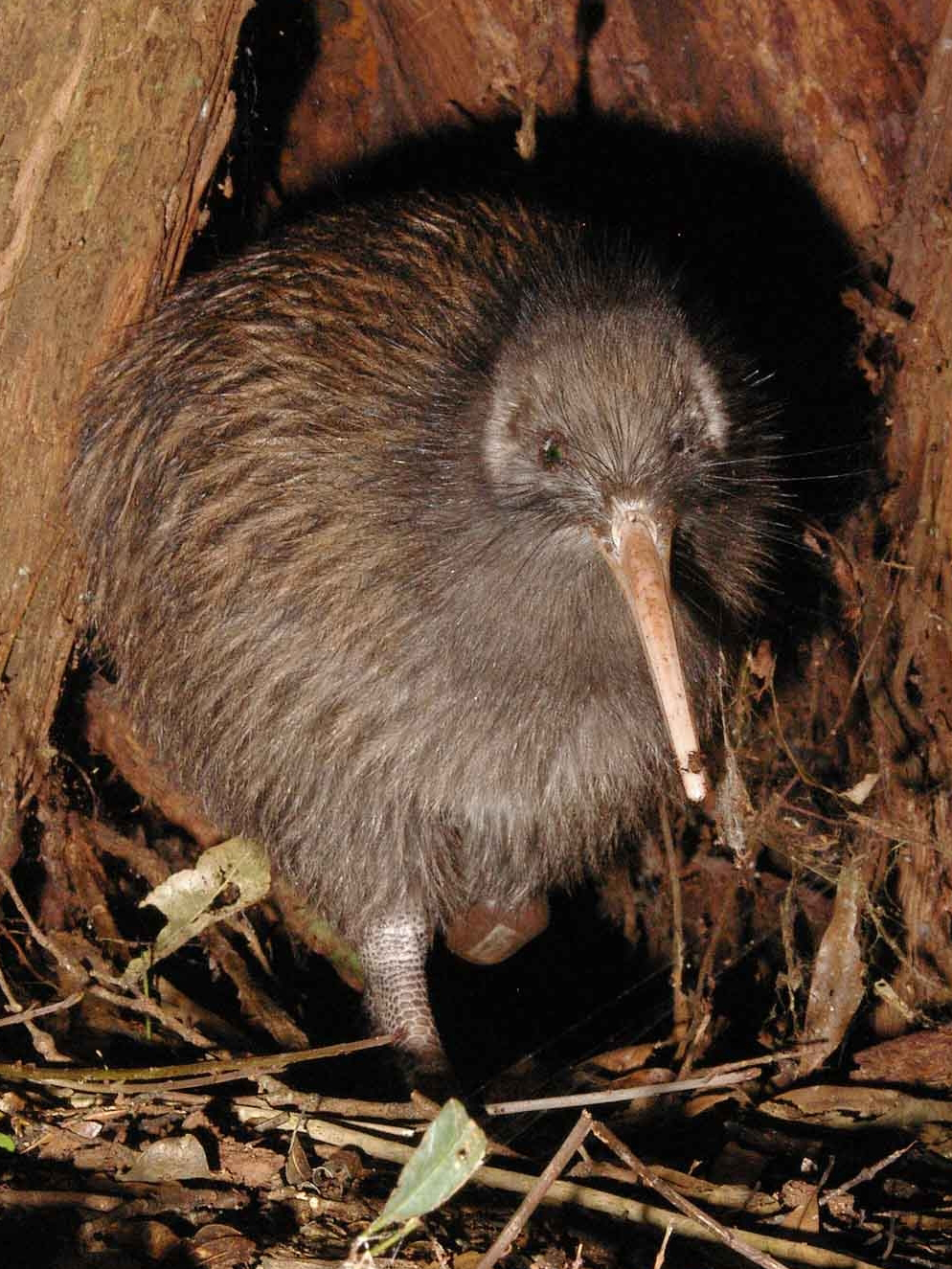
Kiwi have a probing bill which allows them to detect motion.

The bill tip organ is a region found near the tip of the bill in several types of birds that forage particularly by probing. The region has a high density of nerve endings known as the corpuscles of Herbst. This consists of pits in the bill surface which in the living bird is occupied by cells that sense pressure changes. The assumption is that this allows the bird to perform 'remote touch', which means that it can detect movements of animals which the bird does not directly touch. Bird species known to have a 'bill-tip organ' include ibises, shorebirds of the family Scolopacidae, and kiwi.

There is a suggestion that across these species, the bill tip organ is better-developed among species foraging in wet habitats (water column, or soft mud) than in species using a more terrestrial foraging. However, it has been described in terrestrial birds too, including parrots, who are known for their dextrous extractive foraging techniques. Unlike probing foragers, the tactile pits in parrots are embedded in the hard keratin (or rhamphotheca) of the bill, rather than the bone, and along the inner edges of the curved bill, rather than being on the outside of the bill.

== See also ==
- Bird anatomy – Physiological structure of birds' bodies
- Rostrum (anatomy) – Anatomy term
- Snout – Extended part of an animal's mouth
- Proboscis – Elongated mouth part
