= Tactile corpuscles of Grandry =

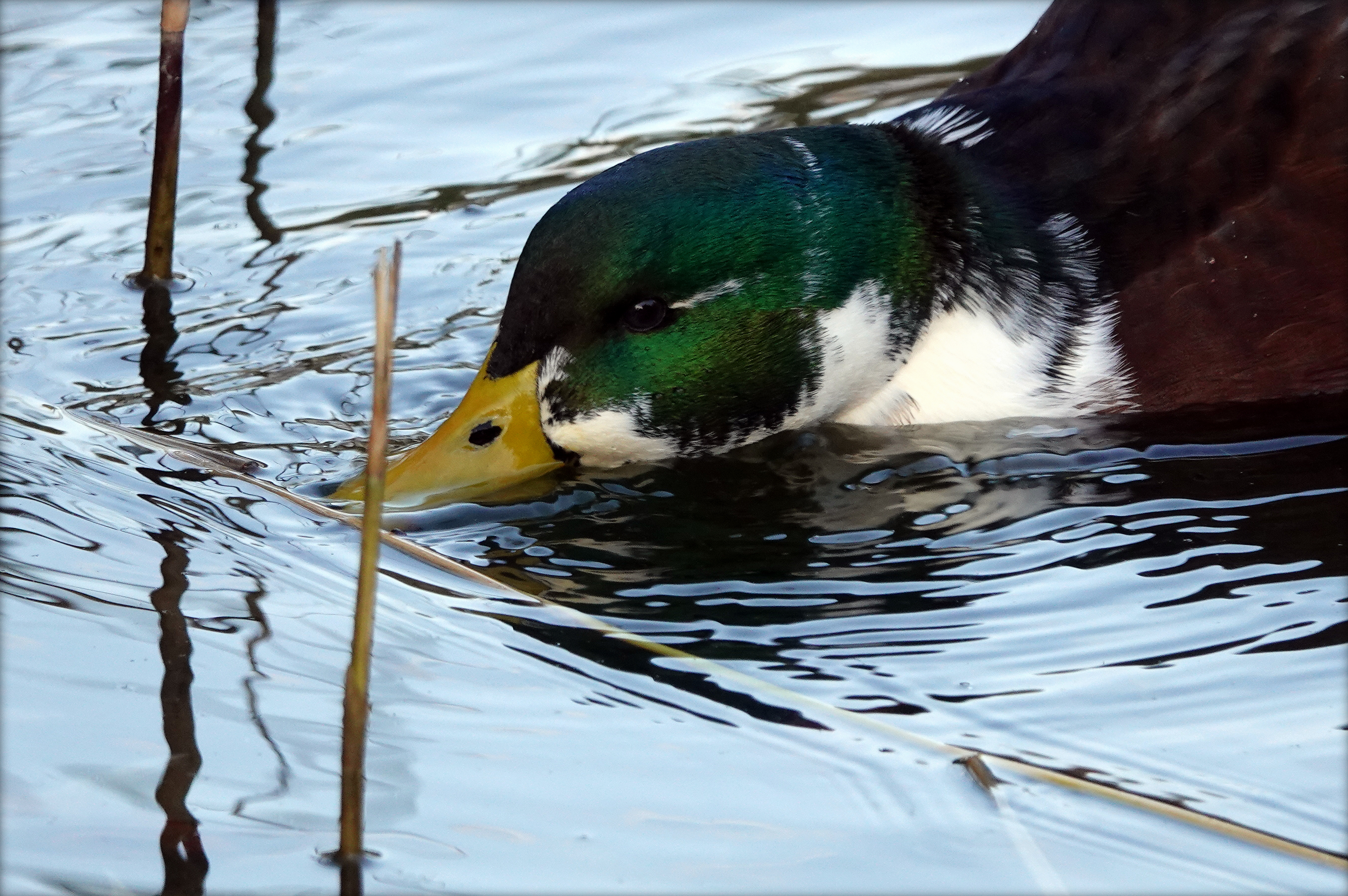
Grandry corpuscles are found in high numbers in the bills of aquatic birds, such as ducks, where they are believed to play a role in feeding.

The tactile corpuscles of Grandry or Grandry corpuscles are mechanoreceptors found in the beak skin and oral mucosa of aquatic birds including waterfowl. They were first described in 1869 in the bill skin of ducks and geese. Their general structure includes the flattened endings of an afferent nerve fiber sandwiched between two or more somewhat flattened sensory cells called Grandry cells, all surrounded by a layer of satellite cells and a partial capsule of collagen protein. Electrophysiological studies have shown that Grandry corpuscles function as rapidly adapting velocity detectors. In birds, Grandry and Merkel corpuscles share many morphological similarities, which has led to some confusion in the literature over their classification (see §Grandry and Merkel corpuscles).

== Location ==
Grandry corpuscles are found in the superficial portion of the dermis in bill skin and oral mucosa of aquatic bird species. The specific location in the dermis varies between and within species; Grandry corpuscles have been observed at depths below the epidermis of 20-150 μm in domestic geese, 1-80 μm in greater white-fronted geese, and 50-100 μm in mallards. In the tip of the bills of ducks and geese, Grandry corpuscles can also be found within dermal papillae which extend through tubules into the maxillary and mandibular nails of the beak. These papillae, which contain many mechanoreceptors and end in keratinous caps, make up a distinct sensory region known as the bill tip organ.

The distribution of Grandry corpuscles also varies spatially over the skin and mucosa. Korgis (1931) and Berkhoudt (1980) have mapped the distribution of Grandry corpuscles in the bills of various duck species. Krogis, who studied the dorsal bill skin of the domestic duck, mallard, Eurasian teal, garganey, and tufted duck, found that Grandry corpuscle concentration tended to increase at both the base and tip of the bill. At the anterior end of the bill the concentration of Grandry corpuscles tended to increase toward the edges. Berkhoudt, who studied the bill of the mallard, had findings consistent with those of Krogis for the dorsal surface of the upper bill, noting also that the density of Grandry corpuscles increased greatly near the nostrils. In the ventral skin of the lower bill of the mallard, the density of Grandry corpuscles increased toward the tip of the bill and toward the bill edges. In the bill mucosa which lines the inside of the lower and upper bill, Berkhoudt noted that the concentration of Grandry corpuscles was highest at the outer edges. In the tongue, Grandry corpuscles were dispersed very sparsely on the dorsal surface only.

== Structure ==
=== Grandry cells ===
Grandry corpuscles typically contain two or more somewhat flattened cells called Grandry cells, also known as sensory cells. The number of Grandry cells in each corpuscle varies between bird species. The domestic duck, for instance, typically has two Grandry cells per Grandry corpuscle, while the domestic goose can have as many as twelve per corpuscle. Two major features of these cells are 1) large bundles of microfilaments and 2) vesicles with electron-dense cores in the cytoplasm. These dense-core vesicles have been shown to contain the neuroactive peptide, substance P, but other contents of the vesicles and any mechanism of secretion from the cell remain unknown.

Within the corpuscle, Grandry cells appear stacked, oriented parallel with the skin or mucosal surface. Discoid nerve endings are sandwiched between the cells, with a narrow gap separating the nerve from the sensory cells. The cell surfaces are relatively smooth facing the nerve, but contain numerous microvillous projections on the periphery. These projections form interdigitations where Grandry cells meet other Grandry cells and where Grandry cells meet the satellite cells which surround them.

=== Nerve fibers ===
At the center of each Grandry corpuscle is the terminal end of an afferent nerve fiber. A single nerve fiber enters each corpuscle and becomes unmyelinated a short distance into the capsule. This fiber can be one of several branches from a single nerve axon that innervates multiple Grandry corpuscles. The unmyelinated nerve then flattens into a wide disc containing many mitochondria. The discoid nerve ending can also be seen to contain clear vesicles and some dense-core vesicles. Thinner nerve fibers lacking myelin sheaths can also be observed just outside the capsule.

=== Satellite cells and capsule ===
Surrounding the Grandry cells is a single layer of satellite cells, which interdigitate with each other and with the Grandry cells. The outermost layer of the Grandry corpuscle consists of a partial capsule containing fibroblast cells and collagen protein.

== Function ==
Grandry corpuscles act as rapidly adapting velocity detectors. Berkhoudt (1979) described how a velocity detection function could explain the distribution of grandry corpuscles observed inside the mouth of the mallard, since detection of the movement of particles in water could aid in filter feeding. The specific mechanism by which grandry corpuscles transmit signal, however, remains unknown. Fujita and colleagues have classified Grandry cells as paraneurons, and though it is suspected that Grandry cells have a neurosecretory function due to the presence of presumptive secretory granules in the cells, there is a lack in sufficient evidence to support this or other proposed mechanisms of signal transduction.

== Grandry and Merkel corpuscles ==
In birds, Grandry corpuscles and Merkel corpuscles are both rapidly adapting velocity detectors with similar morphological characteristics, such as dense-core granules and microvillous processes. Because both receptors contain Merkel-like cells surrounding a nerve axon, they can be categorized as Merkel Cell-Neurite complexes. The similarities between these two avian corpuscles have led to some confusion in the literature regarding the use of the names Grandry and Merkel corpuscle.

The term "Grandry corpuscle" is typically used to describe corpuscles found exclusively in aquatic birds, while the "Merkel corpuscle" has been used to describe similar corpuscles found in non-aquatic birds and other vertebrate species. However, some authors have used the term "Grandry corpuscle" to refer to corpuscles in non-aquatic species. Idé and Munger (1978) pointed out that mammalian Merkel corpuscles are unlike the avian form in that they are slowly adapting and located in the epidermis, whereas avian Grandry and Merkel corpuscles are both fast adapting and found in the dermis. Idé and Munger therefore referred to chicken Merkel cells as Grandry cells and proposed using "Grandry corpuscle" to describe all avian Merkel-like corpuscles, reserving the term Merkel corpuscle for sensory organs found in the epidermis, like in mammals. One problem with this usage is that in mammals and reptiles, Merkel cells are also sometimes found in the dermis.

It was also long believed that Grandry and Merkel cells were species-specific variants of the same cells and did not coexist within any single species. However, despite their similarities, these two cell types can be distinguished from one another based on morphology and size (Grandry cells are much larger than Merkel cells), and Toyoshima (1993) reported Grandry cells and Merkel cells coexisting in the tongue of the domestic duck. This finding suggests that Grandry corpuscles are unique to aquatic birds, while Merkel corpuscles are more general, being found in both avian and non-avian vertebrates.
