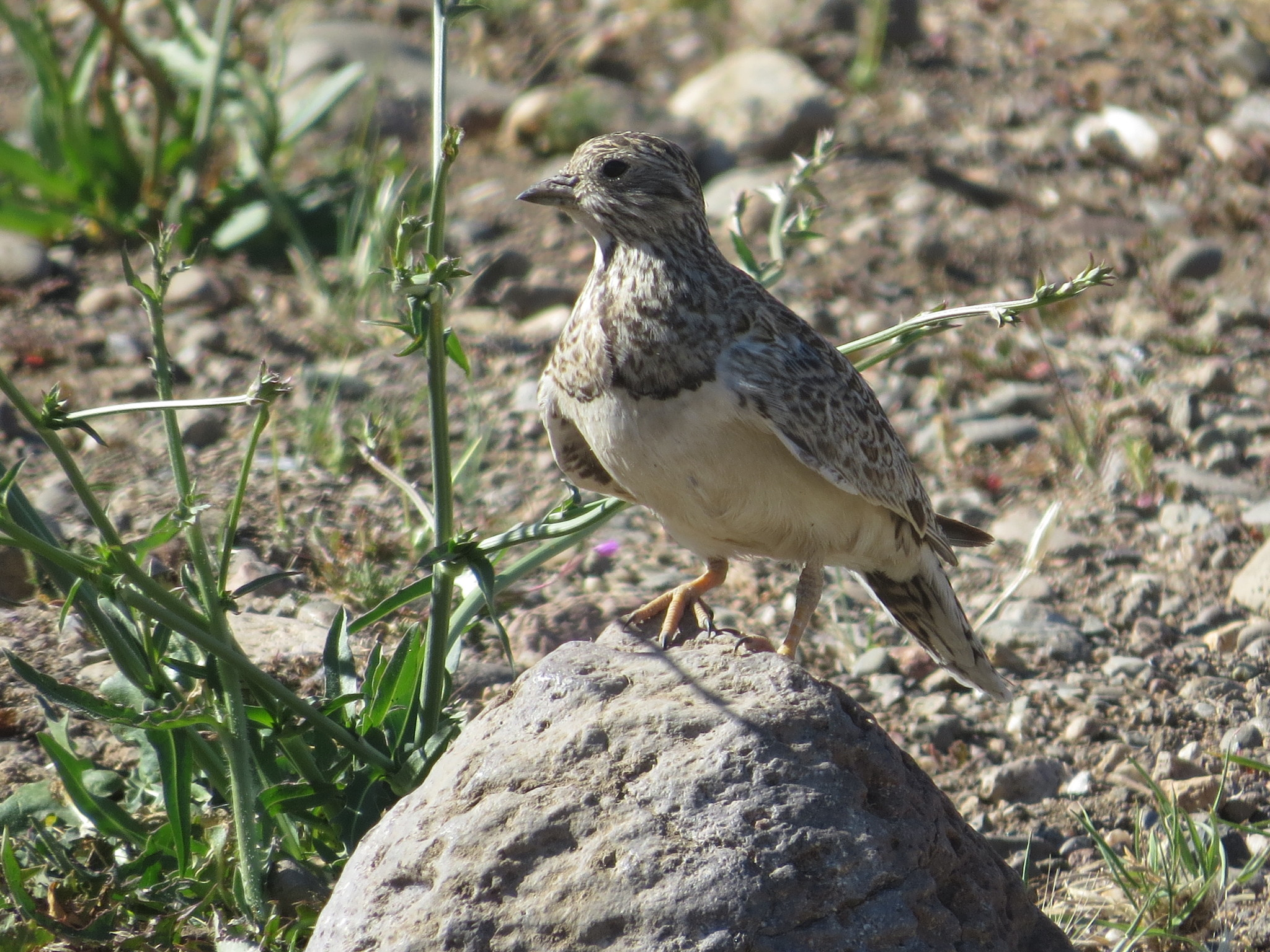

Conservation status
- Least Concern (IUCN 3.1)

Scientific classification
- Kingdom: Animalia
- Phylum: Chordata
- Class: Aves
- Order: Charadriiformes
- Family: Thinocoridae
- Genus: Thinocorus
- Species: T. rumicivorus

Binomial name
- Thinocorus rumicivorus Eschscholtz, 1829
- Range Nonbreeding Year-round

= Least seedsnipe =

Species of bird

The least seedsnipe (Thinocorus rumicivorus) is a xerophilic species of bird in the Thinocoridae family.

It breeds in Argentina, Bolivia, Chile, and Peru. They are common across South America and have been recorded in Ecuador, the Falkland Islands, Uruguay, Brazil, and as far away as Antarctica. The range of the least seedsnipe is estimated to be about 1,300,000 km^{2}.

Its natural habitats are temperate grassland, subtropical or tropical high-altitude grassland, and pastureland, but it can be found in habitats ranging from sandy beaches to the open steppe, and even some open deserts in northern Chile.

== Etymology ==
The least seedsnipe was described in 1829 by Eschscholtz. The genus name comes from Greek thin-, thinos- (θινος) 'sand' or 'desert' and Latin 'corys' (from Greek κορυδος) 'lark'. The species name comes from Latin rumicis 'sorrel' and vorā 'eater'.

== Taxonomy ==
There are three subspecies of the least seedsnipe:

- T. r. cuneicauda, (Peale, 1848): southwest Ecuador & coastal Peru
- T. r. bolivianus, (Lowe, 1921): southern Peru, western Bolivia, northern Chile & northwestern Argentina
- T. r. rumicivorus, (Eschscholtz, 1829): Patagonia to Tierra del Fuego

== Description ==
The least seedsnipe is the smallest member of the Thinocoridae family. They have short tails and long pointed wings. Their legs and toes are a dull greenish yellow. The beak of the least seedsnipe is an ashy color and is conical like that of a finch or a sand grouse. Adult males have a gray face, neck, and breast, and have black lines at the center of the throat that form an inverted "T" shape. The eyes are a dark gray color.

== Behavior ==
Male seedsnipe will commonly perch on a prominent bush or fence post to deliver nuptial calls that sound like a series of a "rapid pu-pu-pu-pu-pu"s, very similar to that of the Common Snipe.

Seedsnipes are well-adapted to arid environments and show no increases in water loss between 20 and 36 °C. The thermoneutral zone extends from 33 to 38 °C in this species, but they have the capacity to dissipate heat through evaporative water loss up to 42 °C. Their metabolic rate is 38% lower than other non-passerine birds of similar body mass (~50 g), reducing the contribution to the total heat budget.

=== Nesting ===
Only the female incubates the eggs. The average clutch size of the least seedsnipe is four eggs laid in a simple nest scrape, which the female buries using her feet (rather than her bill, as is seen in some African Charadrii) whenever she leaves the nest. If loose, dry plant material is available, she will use this to cover the hatchlings until her return. This behavior appears to have arisen independently in Thinocoridae. The primary purpose for nest covering in Thinocorus rumicivorus is most likely concealment from predators, but thermoregulation probably also plays a factor.

=== Diet ===
As the common name suggests, least seedsnipes rely mostly on seeds, but they will also eat leaves and buds and as such are strictly vegetarian in their natural habitat. However, in captivity they have been known to eat mealworms. Unlike most Charadriiformes, least seedsnipes possess a crop, a gizzard and long intestinal caeca. They have been observed foraging from a crouched position, rapidly snapping off plants and swallowing the fragments whole. They also stretch to bite off the top of grasses and tall herbs and are well-suited to browsing. They derive most if not all of their water needs from succulent plants and are only very rarely seen drinking water. They visit the beds of Calceolaria uniflora (Scrophularaceae) and feed on the fleshy growths on the lower lips of the flower and in the process transfer pollen across flowers.

== Status and conservation ==
This species has an extremely large range and is one of the most common birds of southern Patagonia. According to the IUCN, the population appears stable. It has therefore been labeled as species of Least Concern.
