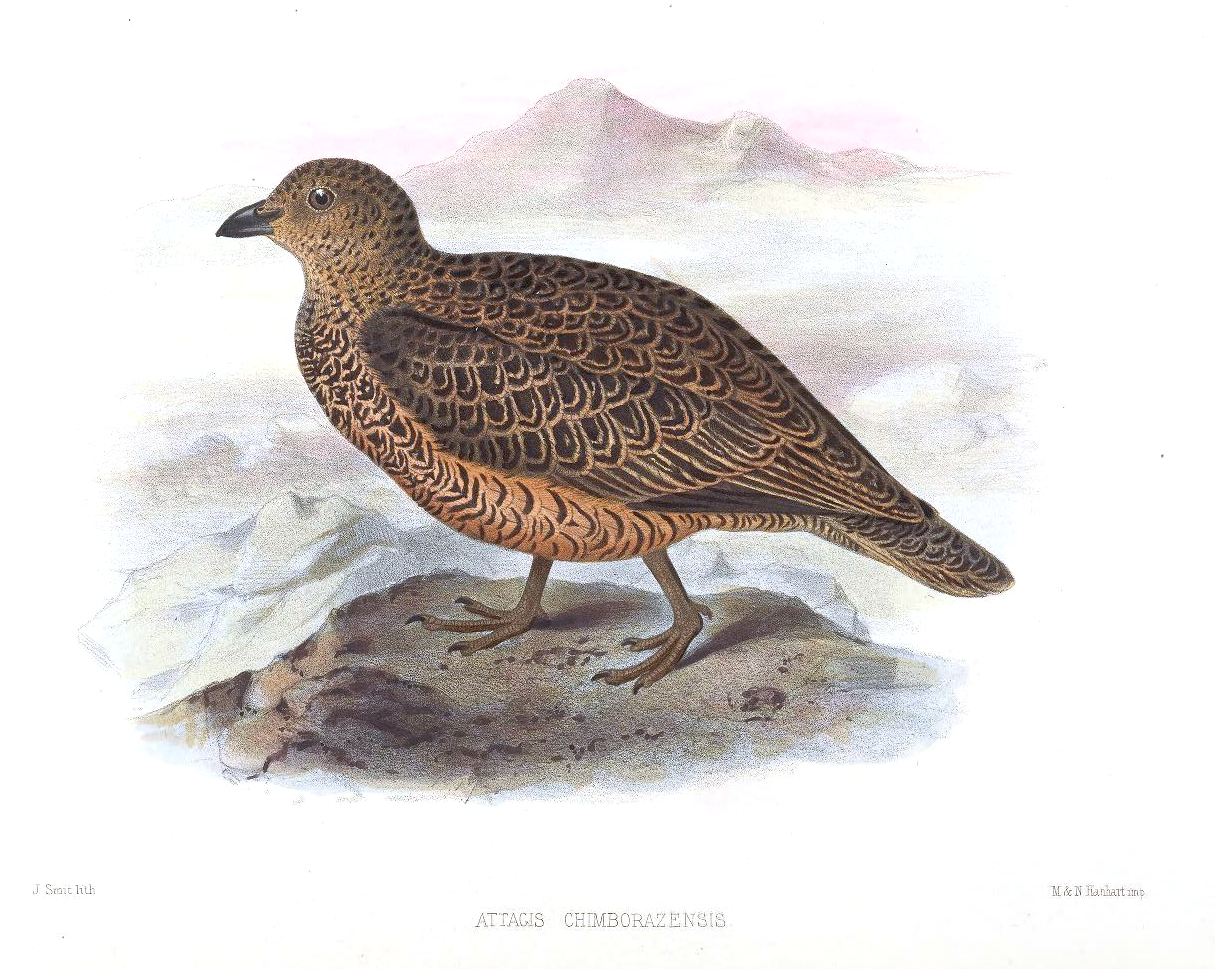

Scientific classification
- Kingdom: Animalia
- Phylum: Chordata
- Class: Aves
- Order: Charadriiformes
- Family: Thinocoridae
- Genus: Attagis; Geoffroy Saint-Hilaire, I. & Lesson, RP, 1831

Type species
- Attagis gayi I. Geoffroy Saint-Hilaire & Lesson, 1831

Species
- Attagis gayi; Attagis malouinus

= Attagis =

Genus of birds

Attagis is a genus of seedsnipe, a South American family of small gregarious waders which have adapted to a vegetarian diet.

These birds look superficially like partridges in structure and bill shape. They have short legs and long wings. Their 2-3 eggs are laid in a shallow scrape on the ground.

The genus was erected by the French ornithologists Isidore Saint-Hilaire and René Lesson in 1831 with the rufous-bellied seedsnipe (Attagis gayi) as the type species. The name Attagis is the word used for a game bird in Ancient Greek texts. It probably referred to the black francolin (Francolinus francolinus).

== Species ==
The genus contains two species:

Genus Attagis – Geoffroy Saint-Hilaire, I. & Lesson, RP, 1831 – two species
Common name	Scientific name and subspecies	Range	Size and ecology	IUCN status and estimated population
Rufous-bellied seedsnipe	Attagis gayi Geoffroy Saint-Hilaire, I & Lesson, RP, 1831 Three subspecies: A. g. gayi; A. g. latrelillii; A. g. simonsi	Andes of South America south from Ecuador.	Size: Habitat: Diet:	LC
White-bellied seedsnipe	Attagis malouinus (Boddaert, 1783)	southwestern Argentina and Tierra del Fuego.	Size: Habitat: Diet:	LC

These are the larger of the four seedsnipe species.
