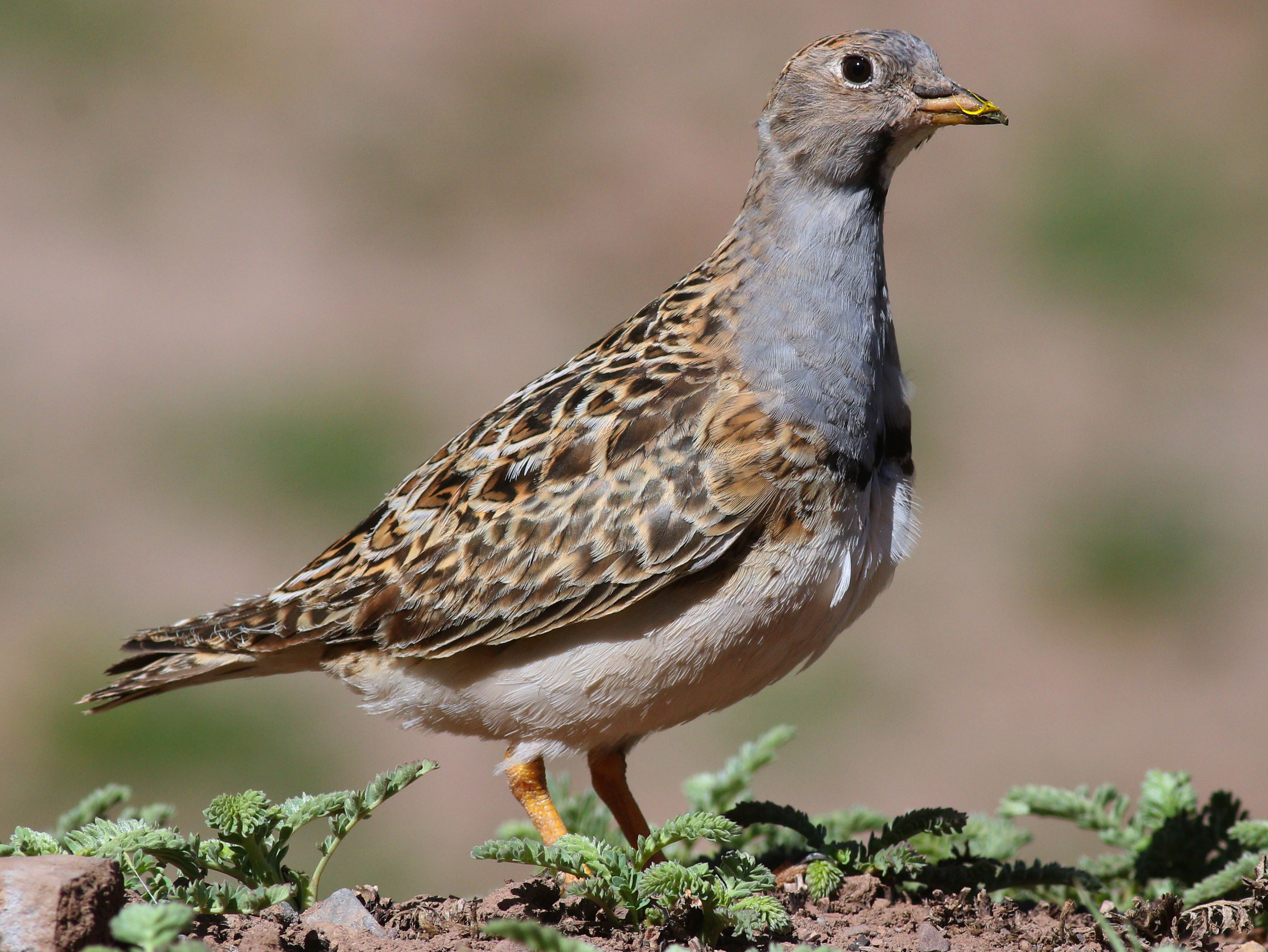

Conservation status
- Least Concern (IUCN 3.1)

Scientific classification
- Kingdom: Animalia
- Phylum: Chordata
- Class: Aves
- Order: Charadriiformes
- Family: Thinocoridae
- Genus: Thinocorus
- Species: T. orbignyianus

Binomial name
- Thinocorus orbignyianus Geoffroy Saint-Hilaire, I & Lesson, 1831

= Grey-breasted seedsnipe =

Species of bird

The grey-breasted seedsnipe (Thinocorus orbignyianus) is a species of bird in the family Thinocoridae. It is found in Argentina, Bolivia, Chile, and Peru.

== Taxonomy and systematics ==
The grey-breasted seedsnipe has two subspecies, the nominate Thinocorus orbigyianus orbigyianus (Geoffroy Saint-Hilaire & Lesson, 1831) and T. o. ingae (Tschudi, 1843).

== Description ==
The grey-breasted seedsnipe is 19 to 24 cm (7.5 to 9.4 in) long and weighs 96 to 140 g (3.4 to 4.9 oz). The male has a gray head, neck, and upper breast, and a white throat with a black border. Its upperparts are cinnamon buff in a vermiculate pattern. The wings show white bars above and below in flight. The lower breast and belly are white; a narrow black band separates them from the upper breast. The female's head and breast are pale buff with heavy dark streaks. The two subspecies are essentially alike though T. o. ingae has shorter wings and legs than the nominate.

== Distribution and habitat ==
The grey-breasted seedsnipe is a bird of the Andes. T. o. ingae is found from the Department of Cajamarca in Peru through western Bolivia into northern Chile and northwestern Argentina as far as Catamarca and possibly Mendoza Provinces. The nominate subspecies is found from northern Chile's Antofagasta Region and northwestern Argentina's La Rioja Province south into Tierra del Fuego. It is a year round resident in most of its range though it moves north out of Tierra del Fuego in winter. It also makes seasonal altitudinal movements.

The grey-breasted seedsnipe inhabits Puna grassland, mostly in areas with low matted vegetation or short grass near bogs. In Peru it is common between 3,400 and 5,000 m (11,200 and 16,400 ft) elevation. Further south it mostly breeds above 1,000 m (3,300 ft) but can be found in summer below 400 m (1,300 ft) in Chilean Patagonia.

== Behavior ==
=== Feeding ===
The grey-breasted seedsnipe is usually seen singly or in small family groups. It feeds on the buds and leaves of herbs and succulent plants.

=== Breeding ===
The grey-breasted seedsnipe breeds between October and February. It places its nest in a clump of grass or other vegetation, usually near water. The clutch size is four eggs.

=== Vocalization ===
The grey-breasted seedsnipe's song is "a repetitive, dove-like “coocoop...coocoop...coocoop...". It is given from the ground and also during dusk and dawn display flights. It also makes a "snipe-like 'chrp'" when flushed.

== Status ==
The IUCN has assessed the grey-breasted seed-snipe as being of Least Concern. Its population is estimated at between 6700 and 17,000 mature individuals and is believed to be stable. Its large range is generally remote, with little human impact.
