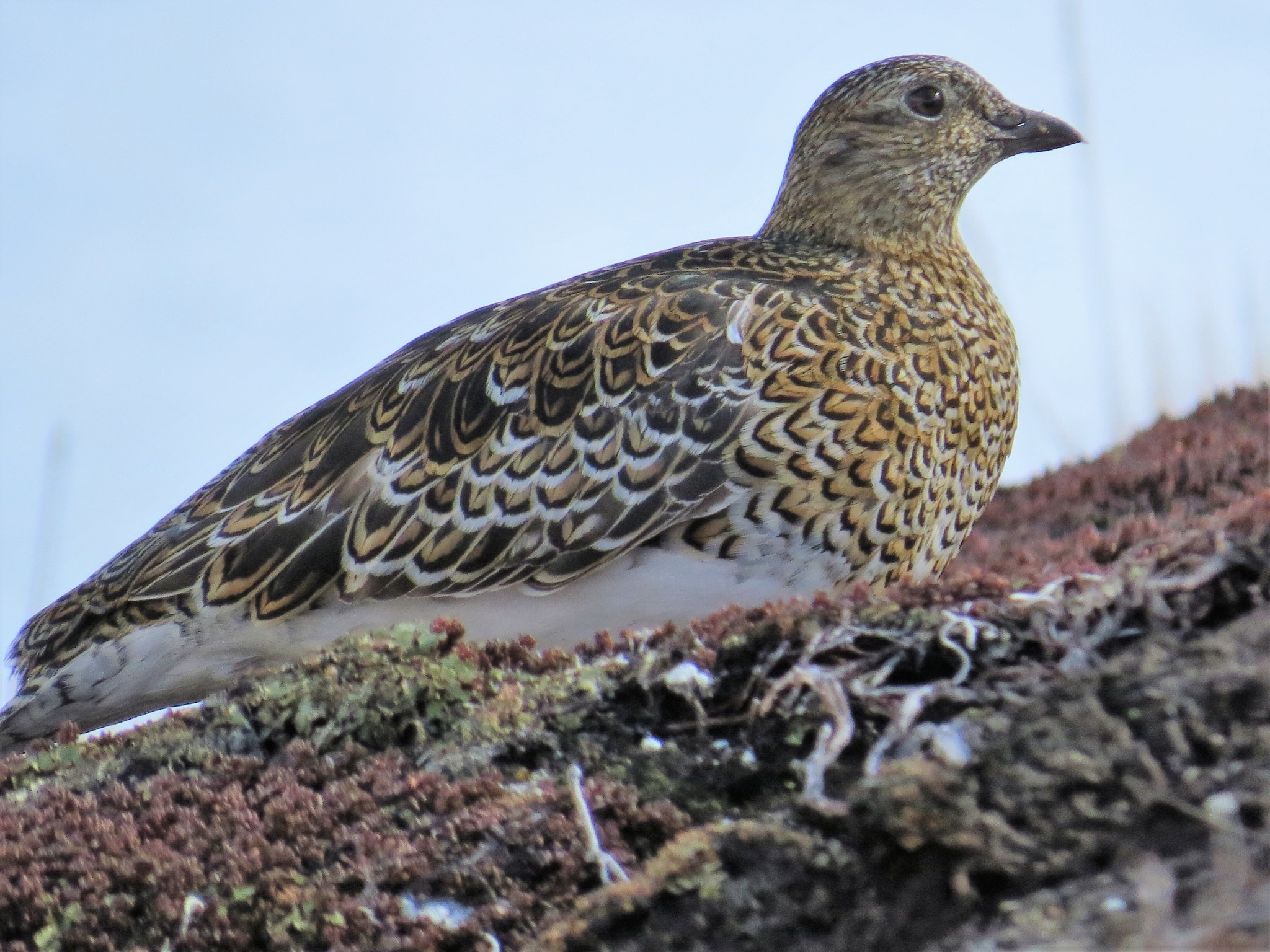

Conservation status
- Least Concern (IUCN 3.1)

Scientific classification
- Kingdom: Animalia
- Phylum: Chordata
- Class: Aves
- Order: Charadriiformes
- Family: Thinocoridae
- Genus: Attagis
- Species: A. malouinus

Binomial name
- Attagis malouinus (Boddaert, 1783)
- Range of A. malouinus Nonbreeding Year-round

= White-bellied seedsnipe =

Species of bird

The white-bellied seedsnipe (Attagis malouinus) is a species of bird in suborder Scolopaci of order Charadriiformes, the shorebirds. It is found Argentina and Chile.

== Taxonomy and systematics ==
The white-bellied seedsnipe was described by the French polymath Georges-Louis Leclerc, Comte de Buffon in 1772, in his Histoire Naturelle des Oiseaux from a specimen collected on the Falkland Islands. The bird was also illustrated in a hand-colored plate engraved by François-Nicolas Martinet in the Planches Enluminées D'Histoire Naturelle which was produced under the supervision of Edme-Louis Daubenton to accompany Buffon's text. Neither the plate caption nor Buffon's description included a scientific name, but in 1783 the Dutch naturalist Pieter Boddaert coined the binomial name Tetrao malouinus in his catalogue of the Planches Enluminées.

The white-bellied seedsnipe is now placed in the genus Attagis that was erected by the French ornithologists Isidore Saint-Hilaire and René Lesson in 1831. Attagis was used for a game bird in Ancient Greek texts. It probably referred to the black francolin (Francolinus francolinus).

The specific epithet malouinus refers to the Îles Malouines, the French name for the Falkland Islands. The species is monotypic.

== Description ==
The white-bellied seedsnipe is 26.5 to 29 cm (10 to 11 in) long and weighs about 310 to 400 g (11 to 14 oz). The sexes are essentially alike. Males' upperparts and breast have an intricate scallop pattern of buff, cinnamon, and black; their chin and belly are white. Females have a somewhat less sharp division between the breast and belly than males. Juveniles are very similar to adults but are slightly paler and have somewhat heavier scalloping.

== Distribution and habitat ==
The white-bellied seedsnipe is found from southern Chile's Magallanes Region and west-central Argentina's Río Negro Province south through Tierra del Fuego to islands off Cape Horn. It has also occurred as a vagrant in the Falkland Islands. In the breeding season it inhabits windswept ridges and moorland characterized by crowberry heath (Empetrum rubrum) and cushion plants. It also occurs along creeks and at small wetlands. Outside that season it mainly inhabits the Patagonian steppe.

== Behavior ==
=== Movement ===
The white-bellied seedsnipe breeds between elevations of 650 and 2,000 m (2,100 and 6,600 ft) and moves to lower elevations in the austral winter. There it typically forms flocks of up to about 50 birds and sometimes more.

=== Feeding ===
The white-bellied seedsnipe feeds on crowberry and other plant matter but details of its diet are lacking.

=== Breeding ===
Little is known about the white-bellied seedsnipe's breeding biology. It lays eggs at least in December and January. Its nest is a shallow scrape in the ground lined with grass, moss, and lichen, and the clutch size is typically four eggs.

=== Vocalization ===
The white-bellied seedsnipe's flight calls are "an excited-sounding 'tu-whit tu-whit' or 'too-ee too-ee...', given continually."

== Status ==
The IUCN has assessed the white-bellied seedsnipe as being of Least Concern. t has a large range, and though its population size is not known it is believed to be stable. No immediate threats have been identified. Much of its Chilean range and part of that in Argentina are protected. It is "largely protected from human interference by occupation of harsh and inaccessible habitat."
