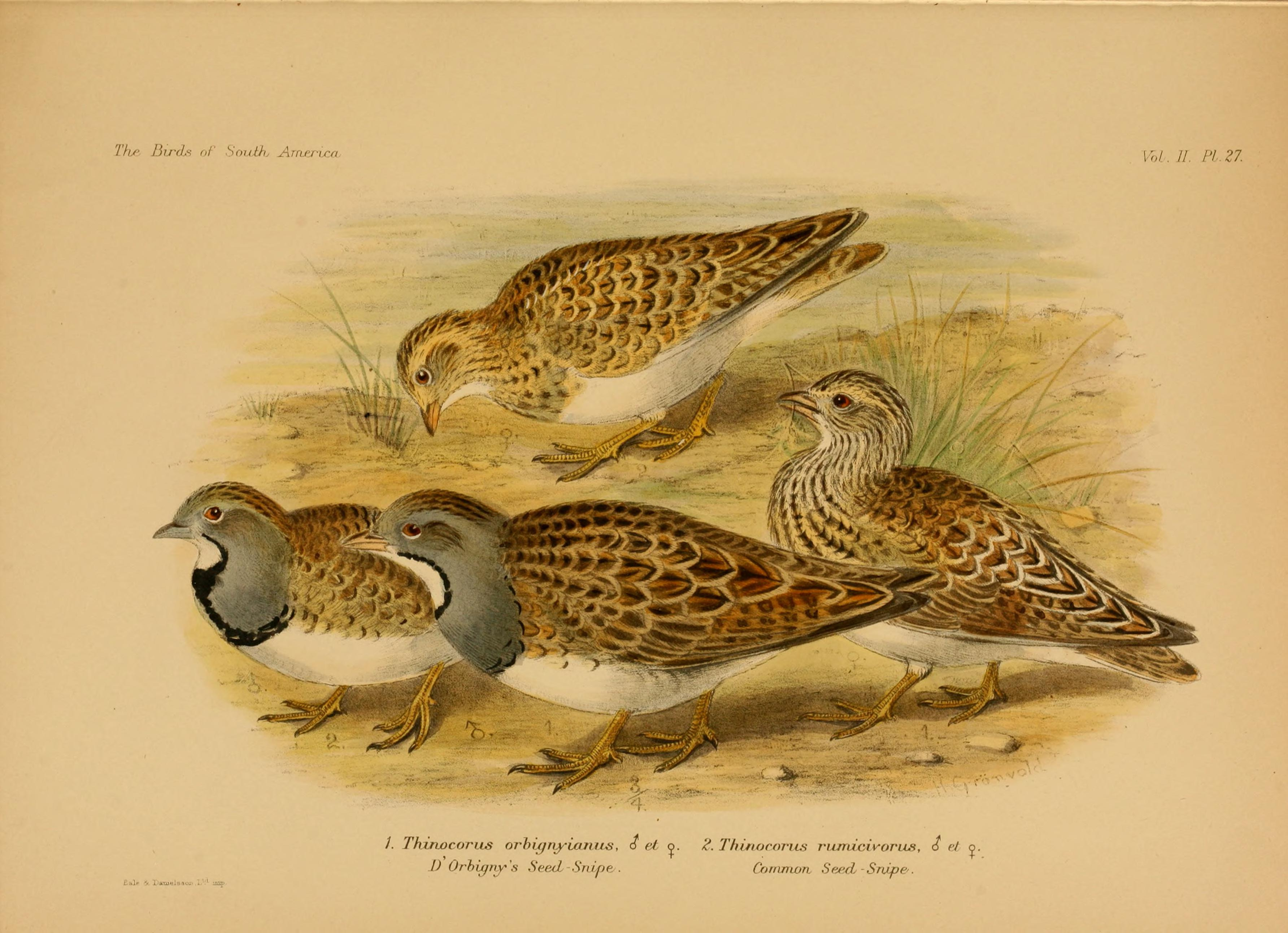
- Thinocorus orbignyianus and Thinocorus rumicivorus from The birds of South America

Scientific classification
- Kingdom: Animalia
- Phylum: Chordata
- Class: Aves
- Order: Charadriiformes
- Family: Thinocoridae
- Genus: Thinocorus; Eschscholtz, 1829

Type species
- Thinocorus rumicivorus Eschscholtz, 1829

Species
- Thinocorus orbignyianus; Thinocorus rumicivorus

= Thinocorus =

Genus of birds

Thinocorus is a genus of seedsnipe, a South American family of small gregarious waders which have adapted to a vegetarian diet.

These birds look superficially like partridges in structure and bill shape. They have short legs and long wings. Their 2 or 3 eggs are laid in a shallow scrape on the ground.

Thinocorus contains the smaller two of the four seedsnipe species.

== Species ==
Genus Thinocorus – Eschscholtz, 1829 – two species
Common name	Scientific name and subspecies	Range	Size and ecology	IUCN status and estimated population
Grey-breasted seedsnipe	Thinocorus orbignyianus Geoffroy Saint-Hilaire, I & Lesson, 1831 Two subspecies: T. o. orbigyianus (Geoffroy Saint-Hilaire & Lesson, 1831); T. o. ingae (Tschudi, 1843)	Argentina, Bolivia, Chile, and Peru.	Size: Habitat: Diet:	LC
Least seedsnipe	Thinocorus rumicivorus Eschscholtz, 1829 Three subspecies: T. r. cuneicauda, (Peale, 1848); T. r. bolivianus, (Lowe, 1921); T. r. rumicivorus, (Eschscholtz, 1829)	Argentina, Bolivia, Chile, and Peru.	Size: Habitat: Diet:	LC
