= Black francolin =

- Male in Tal Chhapar Sanctuary, Rajasthan, India

Conservation status
- Least Concern (IUCN 3.1)

Scientific classification
- Kingdom: Animalia
- Phylum: Chordata
- Class: Aves
- Order: Galliformes
- Family: Phasianidae
- Genus: Francolinus
- Species: F. francolinus

Binomial name
- Francolinus francolinus (Linnaeus, 1766)

Synonyms
- Tetrao francolinus Linnaeus, 1766

Species of bird

The black francolin (Francolinus francolinus) is a 31–36 cm (12–14 in) large francolin native to West Asia and the Indian subcontinent.

== Taxonomy ==
There are six recognized subspecies:

- F. f. francolinus (Linnaeus, 1766) – western black francolin - Cyprus, southern Turkey to Iraq and Iran
- F. f. arabistanicus (Zarudny and Harms, 1913) – Iranian black francolin – southern Iraq and western Iran
- F. f. asiae (Bonaparte, 1856) – Indian black francolin – northern India
- F. f. henrici (Bonaparte, 1856) - South Persian black francolin – southern Pakistan to western India
- F. f. bogdanovi (Zarudny, 1906) – southern Iran and Afghanistan to southern Pakistan
- F. f. melanonotus (Hume, 1888) – eastern India to Sikkim and Bangladesh.

== Description ==
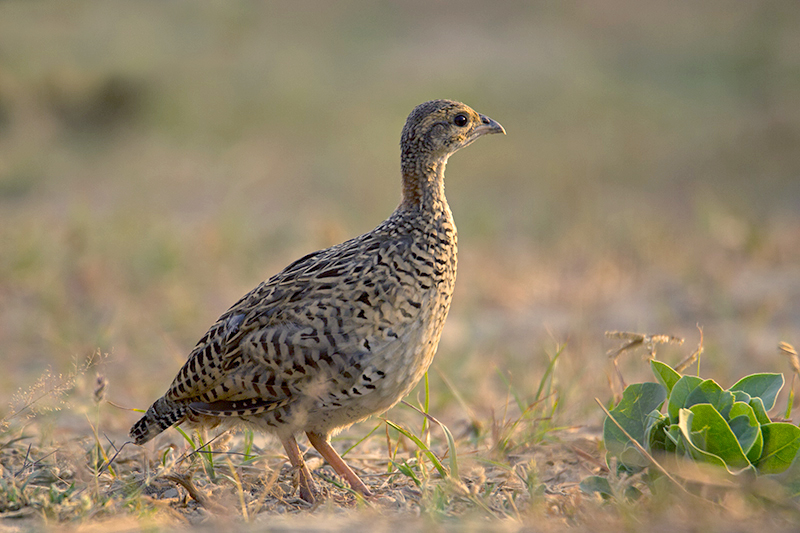
Female black francolin

The black francolin has a body length of 31–36 cm (12–14 in) and weighs 283–566 g (10.0–20.0 oz).

Males are black with a white patch on the cheek, a chestnut collar and white spots on the flanks. Its back and wings are scalloped with shades of golden brown with sub-terminal tawny-buff bands and pale edges. The rounded tail is black with narrow white or greyish bars. The legs and neck are reddish-brown to red. The extent of the white spotting on the flanks varies substantially across the species' range and the depth of colour of the females similarly varies.

The female is mainly brown with a chestnut hind neck. The head is curved with brown irises, brown crown and black throat. The upper plumage, wings and tail as in the male, but the black is replaced by mottled brown and the brown bars on the lower back and tail are wider. The female is duller, with no cheek patch, and the collar is replaced with a nuchal patch. The head and underparts are buff where the male shows black. The rump and upper tail coverts are light brown.

Similar species: the grey francolin has a grey-brown and buff body, buff instead of black throat, and lacks the rufous collar.

=== Voice ===
The call of the black francolin, described as a loud ringing "klik cheek-cheek-cheerakik", "kik-kik-kik" or "kwee-kweeeee-kwee", can be heard in the mornings and evenings and almost all day during the breeding season. The male calls while standing on an earth mound, bund, rock or a low tree branch and is soon joined by other birds answering from all directions.

== Distribution and habitat ==
The black francolin is a resident breeder from south-eastern Turkey eastwards through Iraq, Iran, southwestern Turkmenistan to Pakistan, Nepal and India. It inhabits shrublands and grasslands up to an elevation of 2,500 m (8,200 ft). It prefers areas of thick vegetation, usually near water.

Black francolins were introduced to the Calcasieu Parish and Cameron Parish of southwestern Louisiana in 1961. Additional introductions have also occurred in southern Florida, Guam and the Hawaiian Islands.

Black francolin fossil remains were found in early Holocene deposits in Loutra Almopias Cave in northern Greece dated to 11.230 ± 110 years before present.

== Behaviour and ecology ==
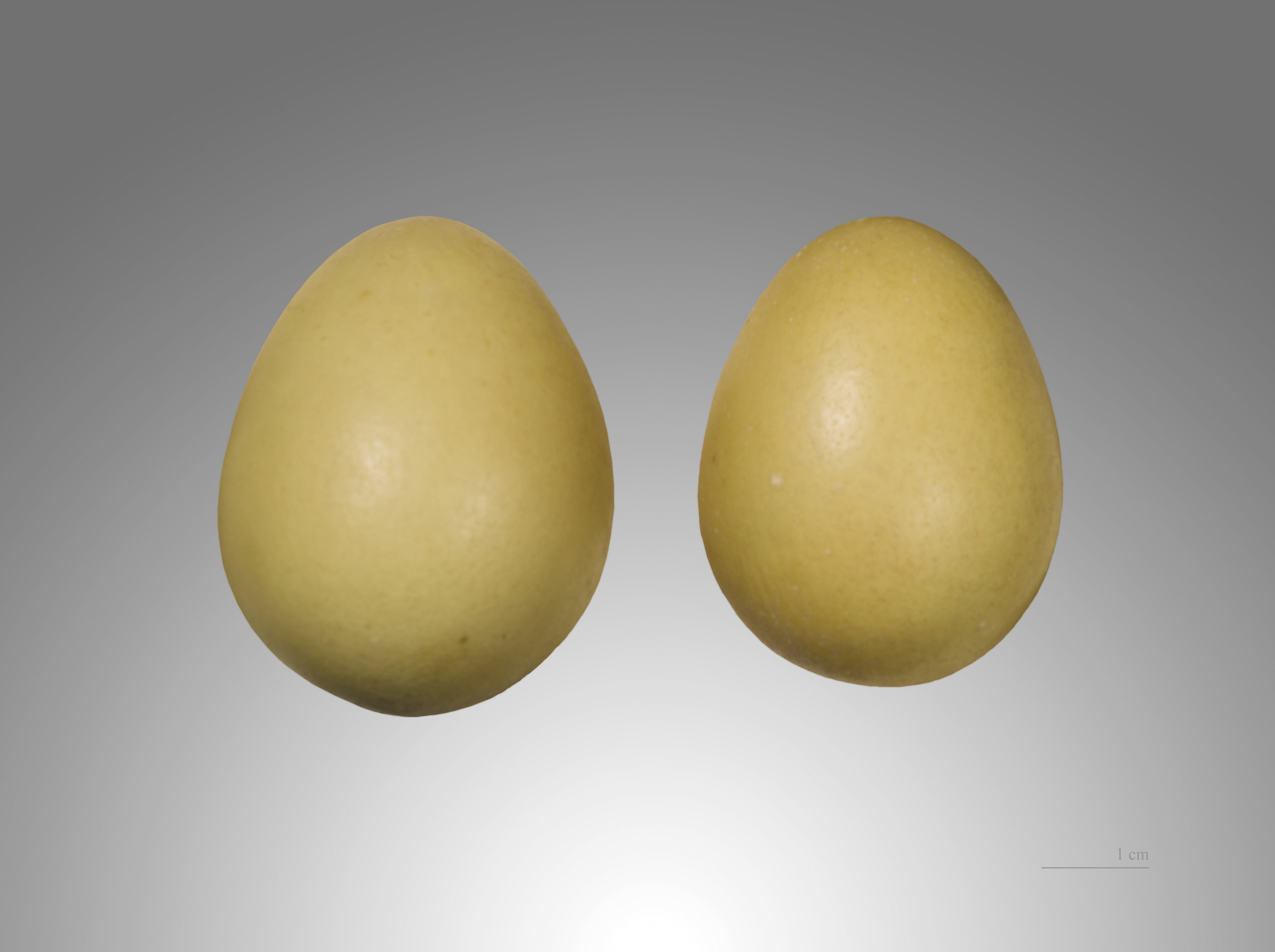
Eggs of a black francolin

The black francolin is monogamous. Its flight is explosive, but it prefers to creep away unseen.

== Threats ==
Fried black francolin is eaten in Azerbaijani cuisine.
