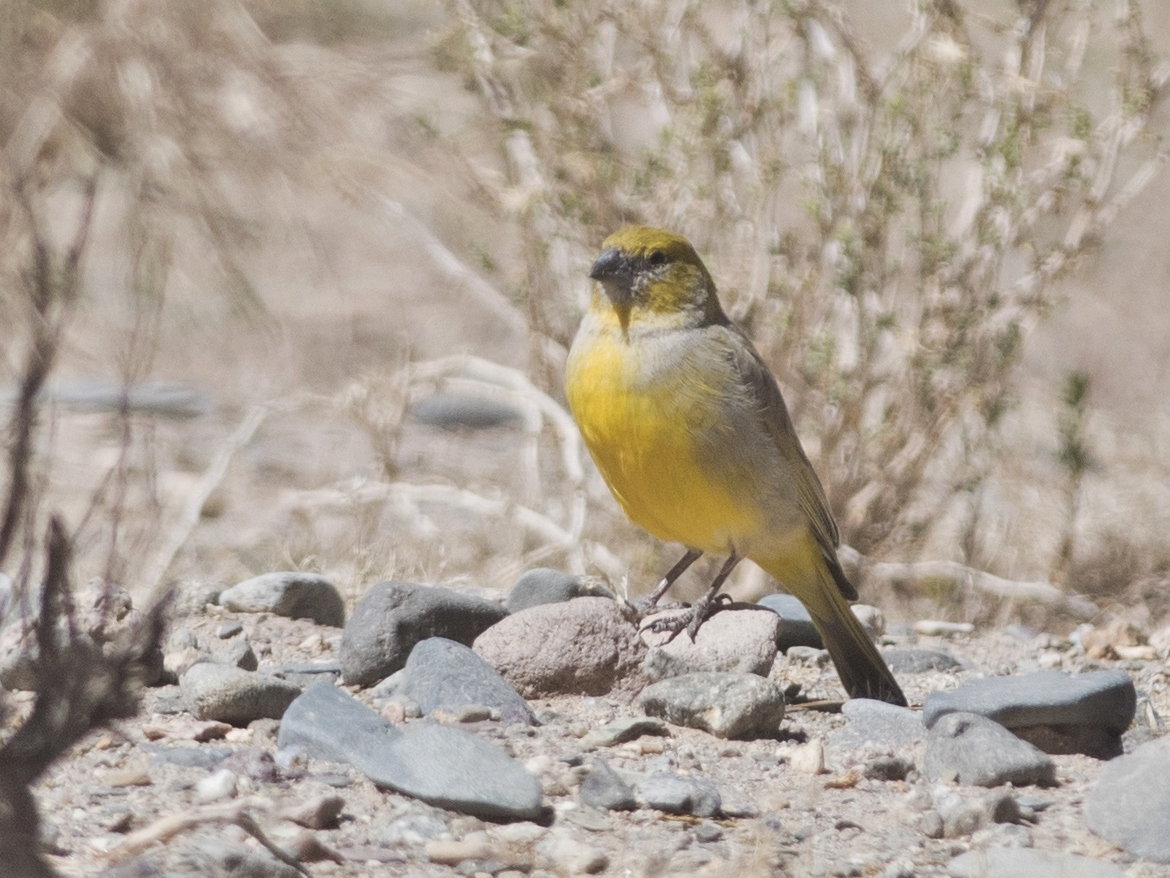

Conservation status
- Least Concern (IUCN 3.1)

Scientific classification
- Kingdom: Animalia
- Phylum: Chordata
- Class: Aves
- Order: Passeriformes
- Family: Thraupidae
- Genus: Sicalis
- Species: S. lutea

Binomial name
- Sicalis lutea (D'Orbigny & Lafresnaye, 1837)

= Puna yellow finch =

Species of bird

The puna yellow finch (Sicalis lutea) is a species of bird in the family Thraupidae. It is found in Argentina, Bolivia, and Peru. Its natural habitat is subtropical or tropical high-altitude grassland.

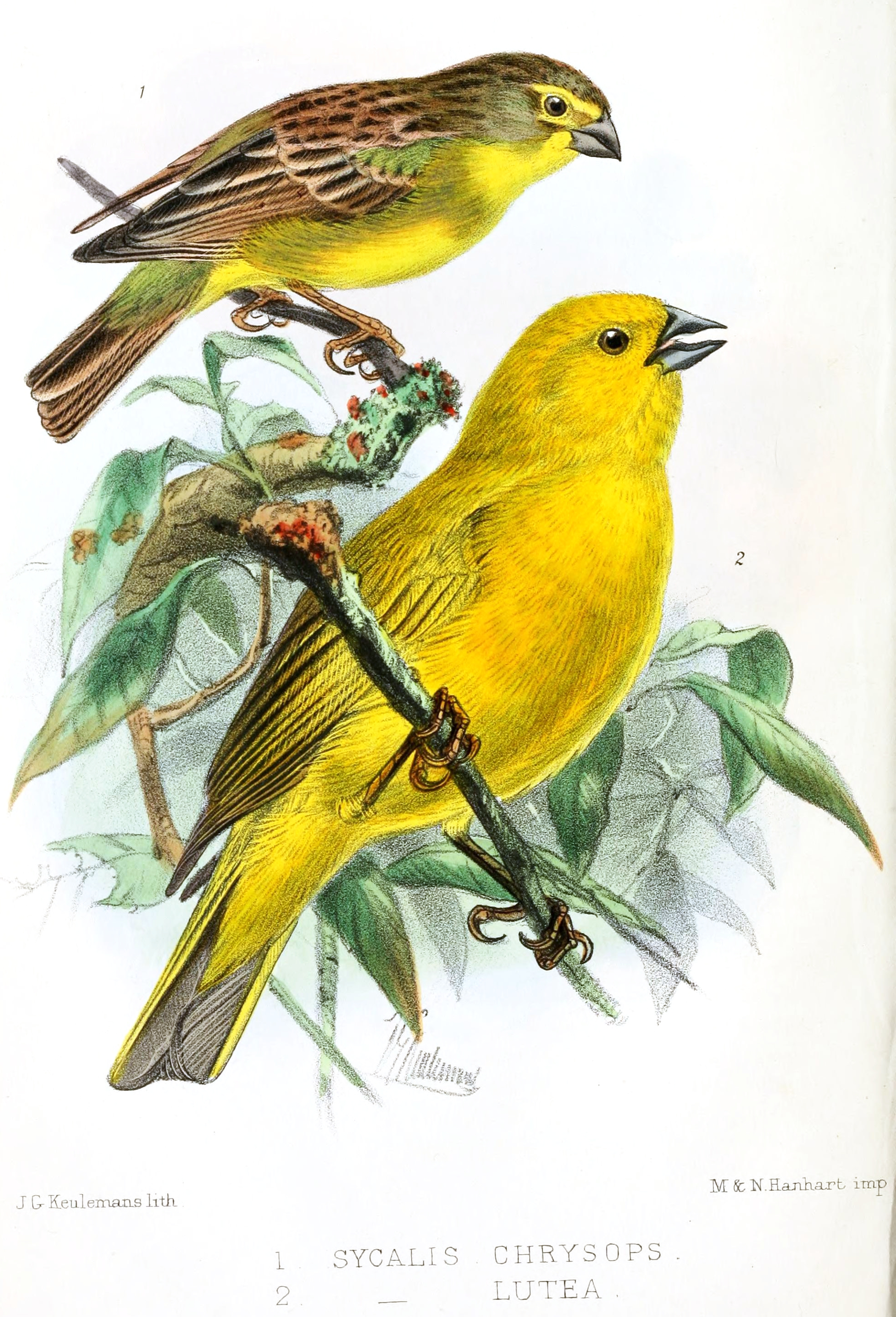
Illustration (bird below) with Sicalis luteola (bird above)
