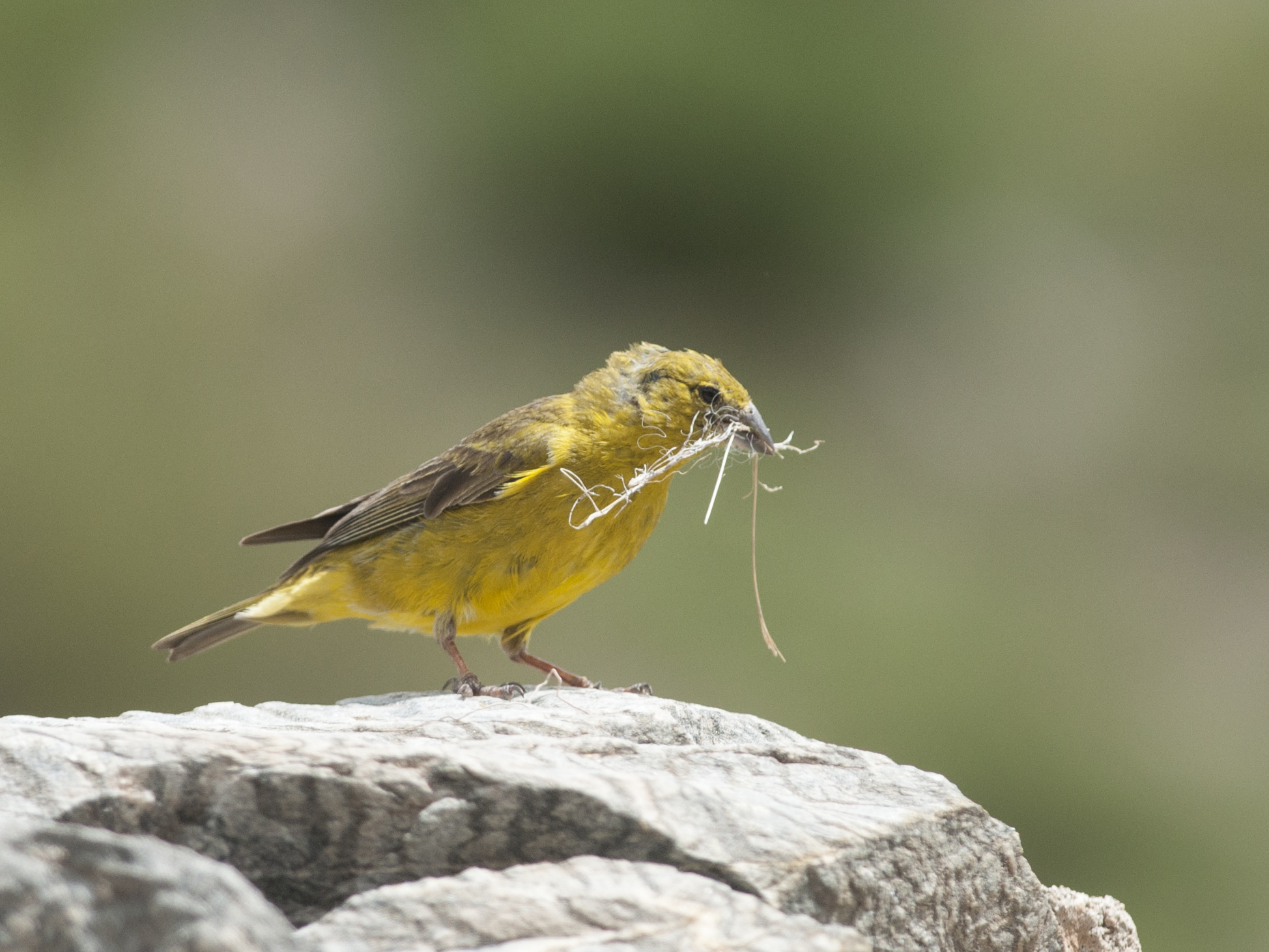

Conservation status
- Least Concern (IUCN 3.1)

Scientific classification
- Kingdom: Animalia
- Phylum: Chordata
- Class: Aves
- Order: Passeriformes
- Family: Thraupidae
- Genus: Sicalis
- Species: S. mendozae

Binomial name
- Sicalis mendozae (Sharpe, 1888)

Synonyms
- Sicalis olivascens mendozae

= Monte yellow finch =

Species of bird

The Monte Yellow Finch(Sicalis mendozae) is a species of bird in the family Thraupidae. The Monte Yellow Finch is found in the Monte Desert in the Catamarca Province of Argentina. The Monte Yellow Finches' habitat is tropical and high-altitude jungles. They are located in high-altitude jungle environments. The most common shrub they can be found in the Monte Desert is the creosote Larrea cuneifolia. It is a common shrub-type bush found in South America with yellow or white flowers, on which the Monte Yellow Finch can often be found perched. The species is primarily granivorous, feeding almost entirely on seeds during the winter months.

== Migration ==
The Monte Yellow Finch is a full migrant. Meaning the entire population migrates seasonally between breeding and non-breeding areas.

== Description ==
The Monte Yellow Finch has a vibrant yellow body, measures 13.5-14 cm, and weighs 16.5–19.8 g. However, the size of the bird doesn't differ between males and females; the colors do. The male Monte Yellow Finch, specifically the breeding male, is bright yellow. The underparts are also very bright yellow and can have a more olive-colored tint in their feathers. During the winter, the male feathers have a grey color, and their tail is shorter than usual. This is one key identifier for the Monte Yellow Finch. The female Monte Yellow Finch can closely resemble or be mistaken for a Patagonian Yellow Finch(Sicalis lebruni), but the olive color tint on the rump of the body differs from the rump coloration of different species. However, the Monte Yellow Finch newborn has a golden yellow head, grey lore's, and a yellow olive mantle.

== Habitat ==
The Monte Finch can be located in the Monte Desert in the Catamarca province of Argentina. The Catamarca province is in western Argentina. Larrea Cuneifolia, a South American bush-like plant with yellow and white flowers, has been associated with the Monte Yellow Finch. They are often observed sitting on top of this plant. The species gathers at bodies of water, especially in desert settings, and can be observed in canyon environments.

== Diet ==
The Monte Yellow Finch diet consists of 99.5 percent seeds, and .5 percent is arthropods. It collects their food in the trees or on the ground. The species is primarily granivorous, feeding almost entirely on seeds during the winter months.

== Breeding ==
Breeding information is limited, but nests have been documented in rock crevices. This adds additional sheltering for nesting sites in the rocky desert terrain. While not in breeding season, the Monte Yellow Finch will form small flocks and nest in rock crevices in canyon environments in the Monte desert of Argentina. Additionally, they can also be seen gathering at water sources, especially in arid habitats.
