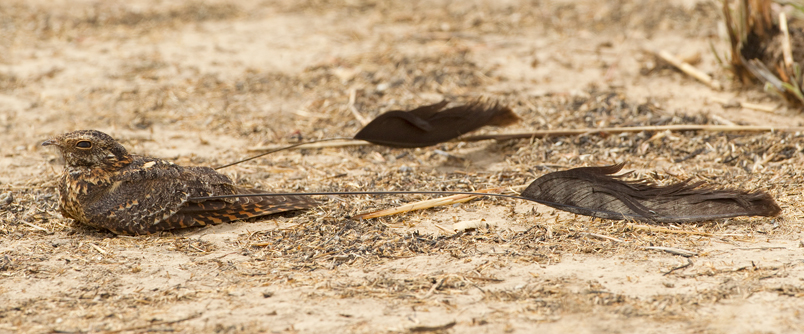
- Breeding male
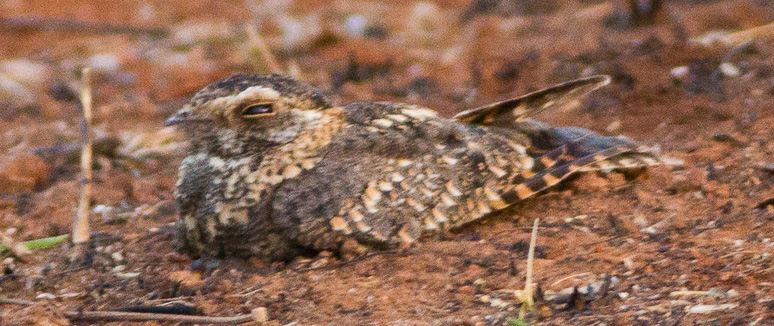
- Non-breeding

Conservation status
- Least Concern (IUCN 3.1)

Scientific classification
- Kingdom: Animalia
- Phylum: Chordata
- Class: Aves
- Order: Caprimulgiformes
- Family: Caprimulgidae
- Genus: Caprimulgus
- Species: C. longipennis

Binomial name
- Caprimulgus longipennis Shaw, 1796
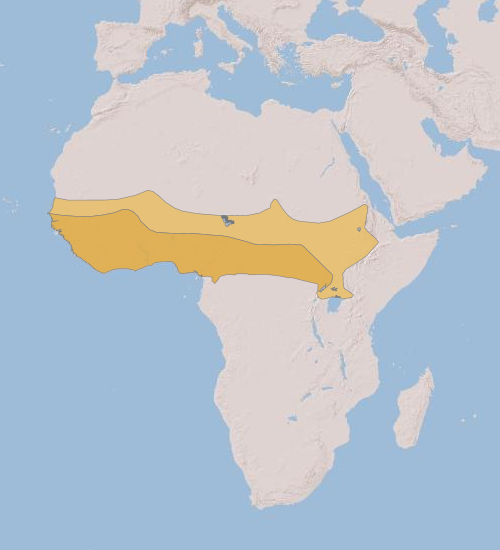
- Range map of Caprimulgus longipennis, breeding range marked as dark and non-breeding range marked as light

= Standard-winged nightjar =

Species of bird

The standard-winged nightjar (Caprimulgus longipennis) is a nocturnal bird in the nightjar family. Previously placed with the pennant-winged nightjar (Caprimulgus vexillarius) in their own genus, Macrodipteryx, it is native to Africa and displays extreme sexual dimorphism. During the breeding season, males will grow broad ornamental flight feathers longer than their body.

== Distribution and habitat ==
The standard-winged nightjar is a resident breeder in Africa from southern Senegal east to Ethiopia. It spends the non-breeding season in the Sahel region to the north. Its habitat includes lightly wooded savanna, with some scrub, as well as agricultural land in thickly wooded savanna. It has been observed at elevations as high as 2,030 metres (6,660 ft) in Ethiopia, but is typically found from sea level up to elevations of 1,400 metres (4,600 ft).

== Description ==
When roosting on the ground during the day, this medium-sized (20–23 centimetres (7.9–9.1 in) long) nightjar is mainly variegated grey, with a browner collar. It has a shadowy form with easy, silent moth-like flight; this nightjar is relatively short-tailed, and lacks white in the wings or tail. The song is a churring trill.

The adult male grows ornamental feathers during the breeding season which consists of a broad secondary flight feather on each wing elongated to up to 53.5 centimetres (21.1 in), over twice the length of the bird's body. In normal flight, these feathers trail behind, but in display flight they are displayed like standards. These large feathers have been postulated as a feature developed through intense sexual selection. Outside the breeding season, the female is distinguished from the male by its smaller size and similarity to the pennant-winged nightjar, notably the patch of white on the throat and dark barring on the belly.

== Behaviour ==
Like other nightjars, the standard-winged nightjar feeds on insects in flight, their mouths opening wide for moths and beetles. It flies at dusk, when the highest quantity of prey is available, though its foraging patterns change depending on moonlight, with later, more nocturnal foraging correlated with higher levels of moonlight. It may also feed on swarms of insects disturbed by fires and artificial lights, a behaviour which has been linked to bird strike by cars when their lights illuminate roads.

During breeding season, male and (less frequently) female standard-winged nightjars will gather in patches of soil with little vegetation to forage and for males to perform display flights. Such behaviour has been considered a form of lekking. Outside of breeding season, standard-winged nightjars have been observed traveling in groups of up to 20 individual birds.

No nest is made; in each clutch, two elliptical, slightly glossy eggs are placed upon bare sandy soil.

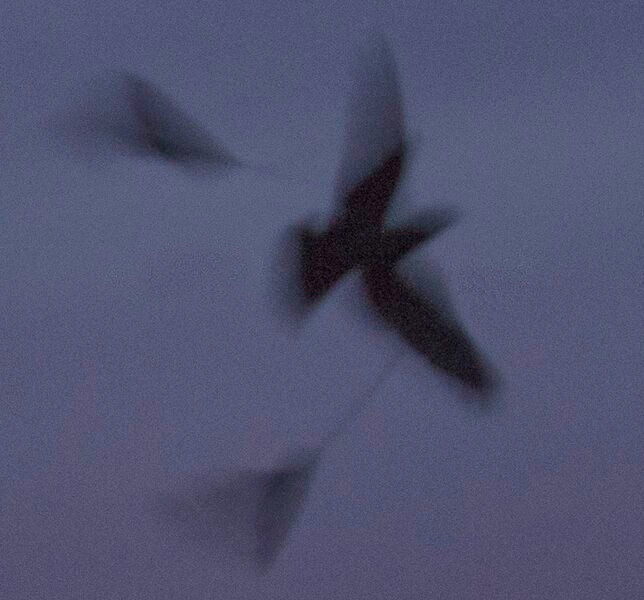
Male standard-winged nightjar in flight displaying its ornamental feathers

== Nomenclature ==
Though the standard-winged nightjar was originally placed in the genus Caprimulgus as in its first identification by George Shaw in 1796, it was later placed in the genus Macrodipteryx along with the pennant-winged nightjar. A phylogenetic study done in 2010 deprecated Macrodipteryx, placing both the pennant-winged nightjar and standard-winged nightjar species within Caprimulgus. The two species are closely related, despite their differences in breeding ranges and breeding seasons.

== Ecology and conservation ==
Standard-winged nightjars are migratory birds and travel to and from breeding grounds annually. The precise breeding season varies based on region, and is affected by prey availability and rain; populations that live in more southern regions breed earlier than those in northern regions.

The standard-winged nightjar population is not considered to be under threat and is listed as least-concern by the International Union for Conservation of Nature (IUCN) on the IUCN Red List.
