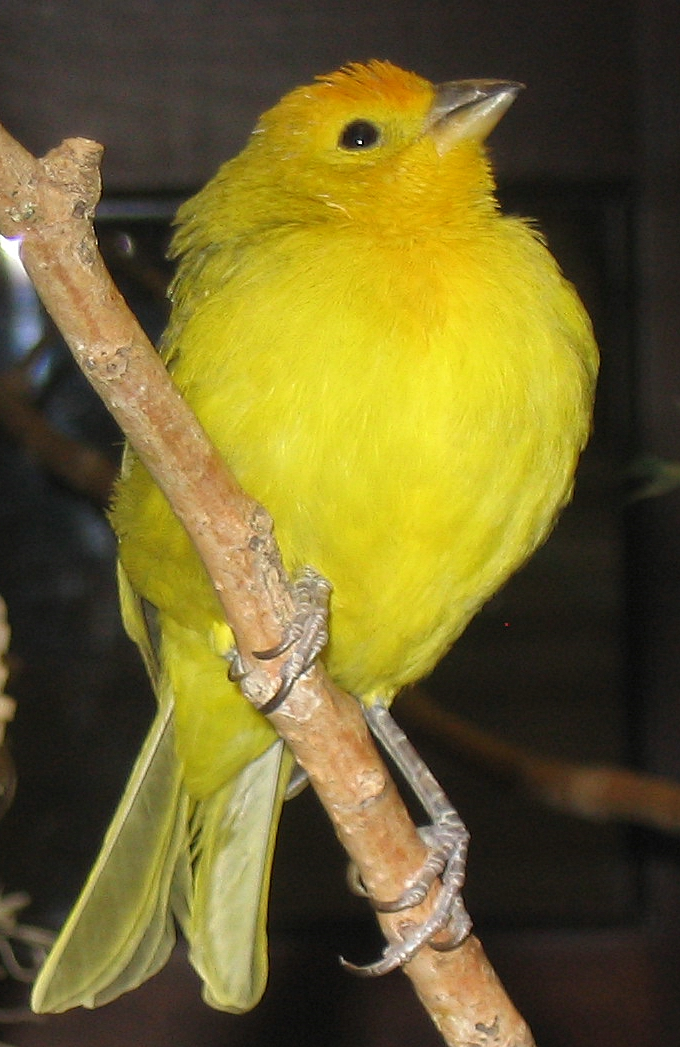
- Saffron finch Sicalis flaveola

Scientific classification
- Kingdom: Animalia
- Phylum: Chordata
- Class: Aves
- Order: Passeriformes
- Family: Thraupidae
- Genus: Sicalis; F. Boie, 1828

Type species
- Emberiza braziliensis Gmelin, 1789

= Sicalis =

Genus of birds

Sicalis is a genus of birds in the tanager family Thraupidae. Sometimes classified in the bunting and American sparrow family Emberizidae, more recent studies have shown it to belong in the Thraupidae.

== Taxonomy and species list ==
The genus Sicalis was introduced in 1828 by the German zoologist Friedrich Boie. The name is from the Ancient Greek σικαλίς/sikalis, a small, black-headed bird, mentioned by Epicharmus, Aristotle, and other authors. It was perhaps a warbler in the genus Sylvia. The type species is the saffron finch. The genus now contains 13 species.

Image	Scientific name	Common name	Distribution
	Sicalis citrina	Stripe-tailed yellow finch	Argentina, Bolivia, Brazil, Colombia, Guyana, Paraguay, Peru, Suriname, and Venezuela
	Sicalis taczanowskii	Sulphur-throated finch	Ecuador and Peru
	Sicalis uropigyalis	Bright-rumped yellow finch	the Altiplano of Peru, Bolivia and northern Chile and Argentina
	Sicalis flaveola	Saffron finch	Ecuador, western Peru, eastern and southern Brazil, Bolivia, Paraguay, Uruguay, northern Argentina, and Trinidad and Tobago
	Sicalis columbiana	Orange-fronted yellow finch	Brazil, Colombia and Venezuela
	Sicalis luteola	Grassland yellow finch	Colombia south and east to the Guianas and central Ecuador, Peru and Brazil. Birds which breed further south in Argentina and Uruguay migrate to Bolivia and southern Brazil in the austral winter. There are also isolated populations in Central America and Mexico
	Sicalis luteocephala	Citron-headed yellow finch	Andes of Bolivia and far northern Argentina
	Sicalis lebruni	Patagonian yellow finch	Argentina and Tierra del Fuego; also Chile.
	Sicalis olivascens	Greenish yellow finch	the Andes of Argentina, Bolivia, Chile, and Peru
	Sicalis mendozae	Monte yellow finch	western Argentina.
	Sicalis auriventris	Greater yellow finch	Argentina and Chile
	Sicalis raimondii	Raimondi's yellow finch	Peru
	Sicalis lutea	Puna yellow finch	Argentina, Bolivia, and Peru
