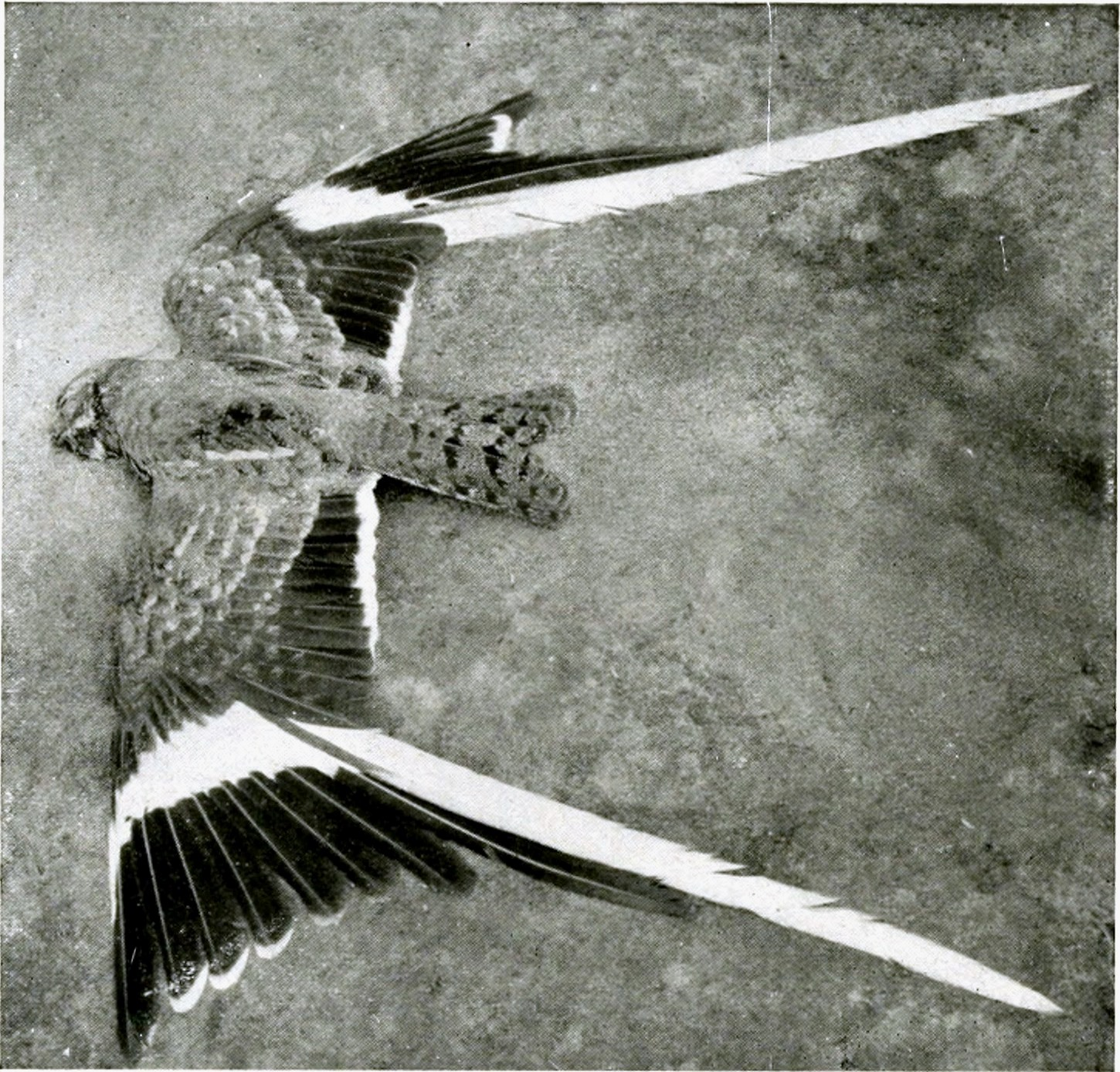
- Young breeding male
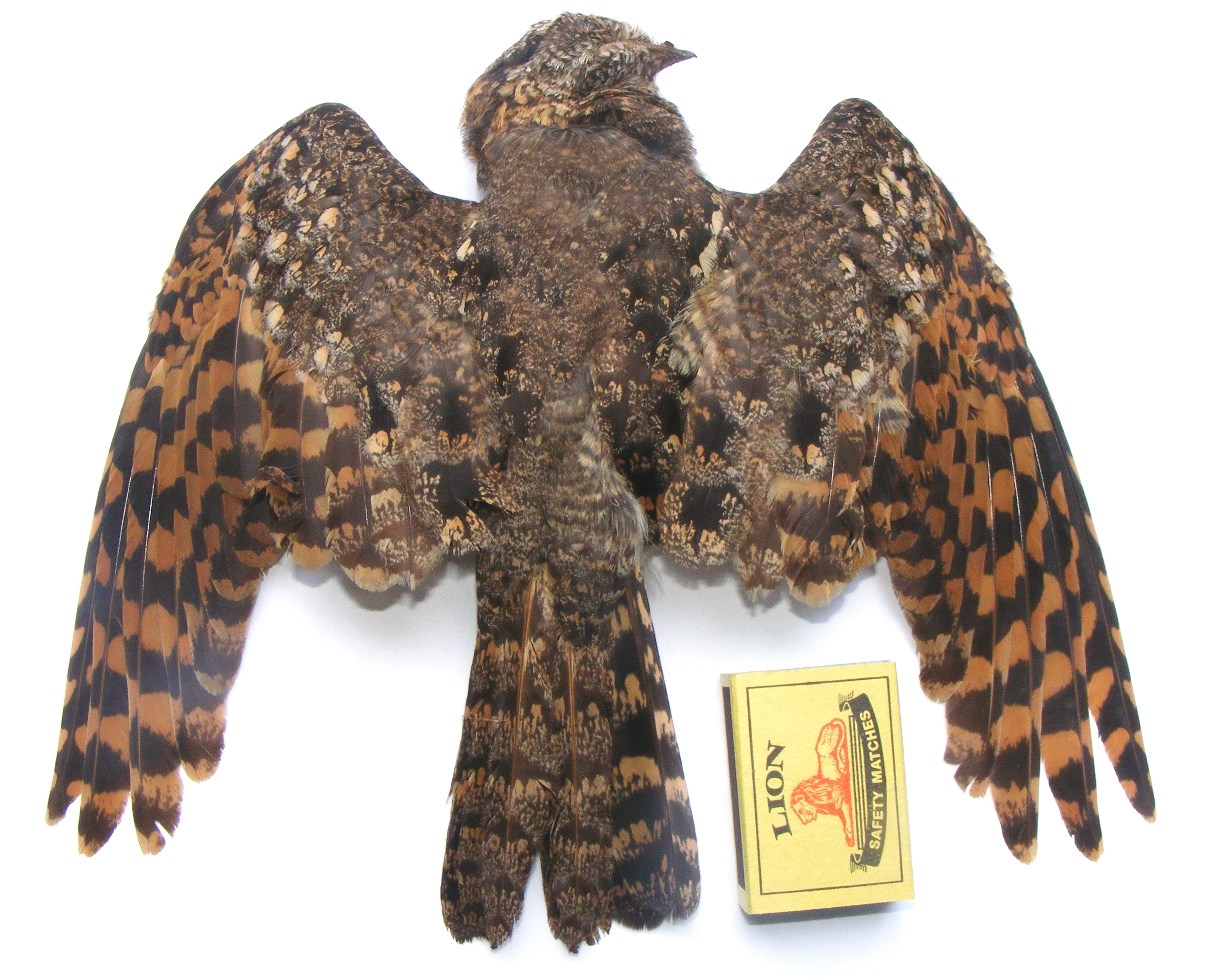
- Female

Conservation status
- Least Concern (IUCN 3.1)

Scientific classification
- Kingdom: Animalia
- Phylum: Chordata
- Class: Aves
- Order: Caprimulgiformes
- Family: Caprimulgidae
- Genus: Caprimulgus
- Species: C. vexillarius

Binomial name
- Caprimulgus vexillarius (Gould, 1838)

Synonyms
- Macrodipteryx vexillarius

= Pennant-winged nightjar =

Species of bird

The pennant-winged nightjar (Caprimulgus vexillarius) is a species of nightjar that occurs from Nigeria to northern South Africa. It is an intra-African migrant and displays remarkable sexual dimorphism in the breeding season.

== Range and habitat ==
Their preferred habitat south of the equator is plateau woodlands, especially Miombo, where they are partial to stony or boulder-strewn hillsides. They are observed as bi-annual and social passage migrants along the Kenyan Rift Valley and Lake Victoria regions, and spend the non-breeding season in subtropical savanna from Nigeria to Sudan.

== Description ==
The male of the species is characteristic in having a broad white band over the otherwise black primaries. In addition the males acquire a striking 2nd primary feather during the breeding season. These pennant feathers grow to greater lengths in successive years, up to twice the body length. They are dropped or broken off quickly upon completion of breeding. With the distal (9th) and proximal (1st - 3rd) primaries being longest, the wings of male birds are distinctly angular.

== Habits ==
Foraging birds emerge in the late afternoon or directly after sunset for crepuscular feeding and are once again active before sunrise. Their diet includes a variety of insects although scarab beetles are favoured. They drink while flying slowly over a water surface. The roost and nest are on bare ground, sometimes among leaf litter. When disturbed they may perch lengthwise on a branch, reminiscent of the similar-sized European nightjar.

== Breeding ==
Breeding takes place from spring to early summer while south of the equator. Males have separate display territories and attract passing females with an insect-like song. Males furthermore engage in display flights, low through woodland or at great height, wherein they may be joined by receptive females. Egg-laying coincides with the full moon. By mid-summer some birds start returning to the northern hemisphere.

== Gallery ==
Male plumages

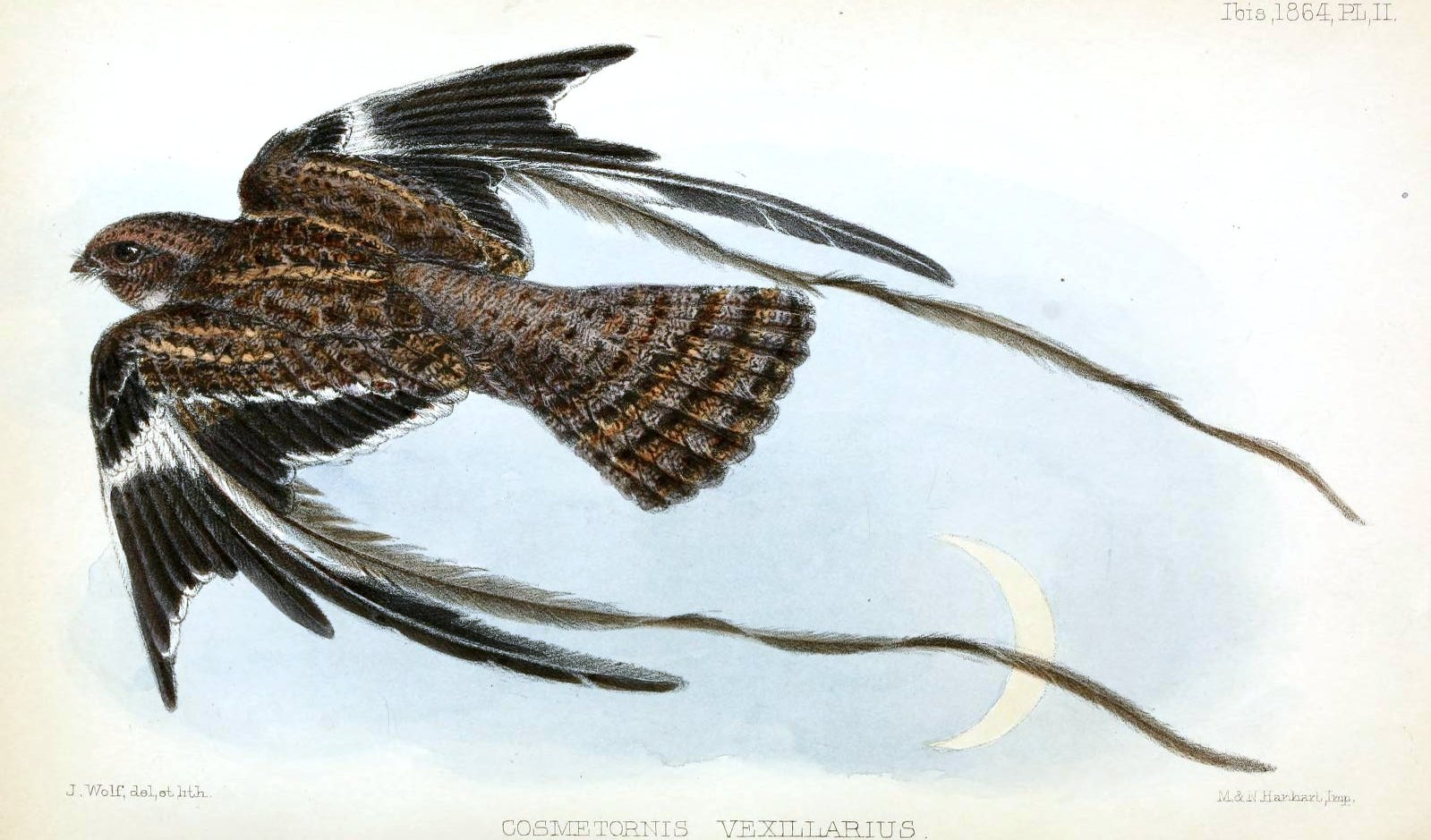
Adult male in courtship display

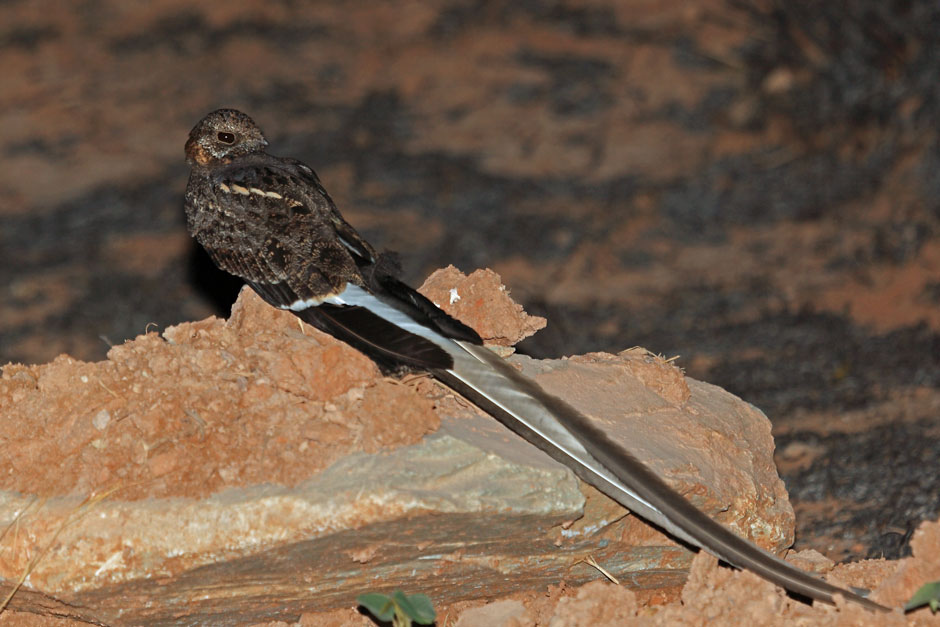
Perched male in the DRC

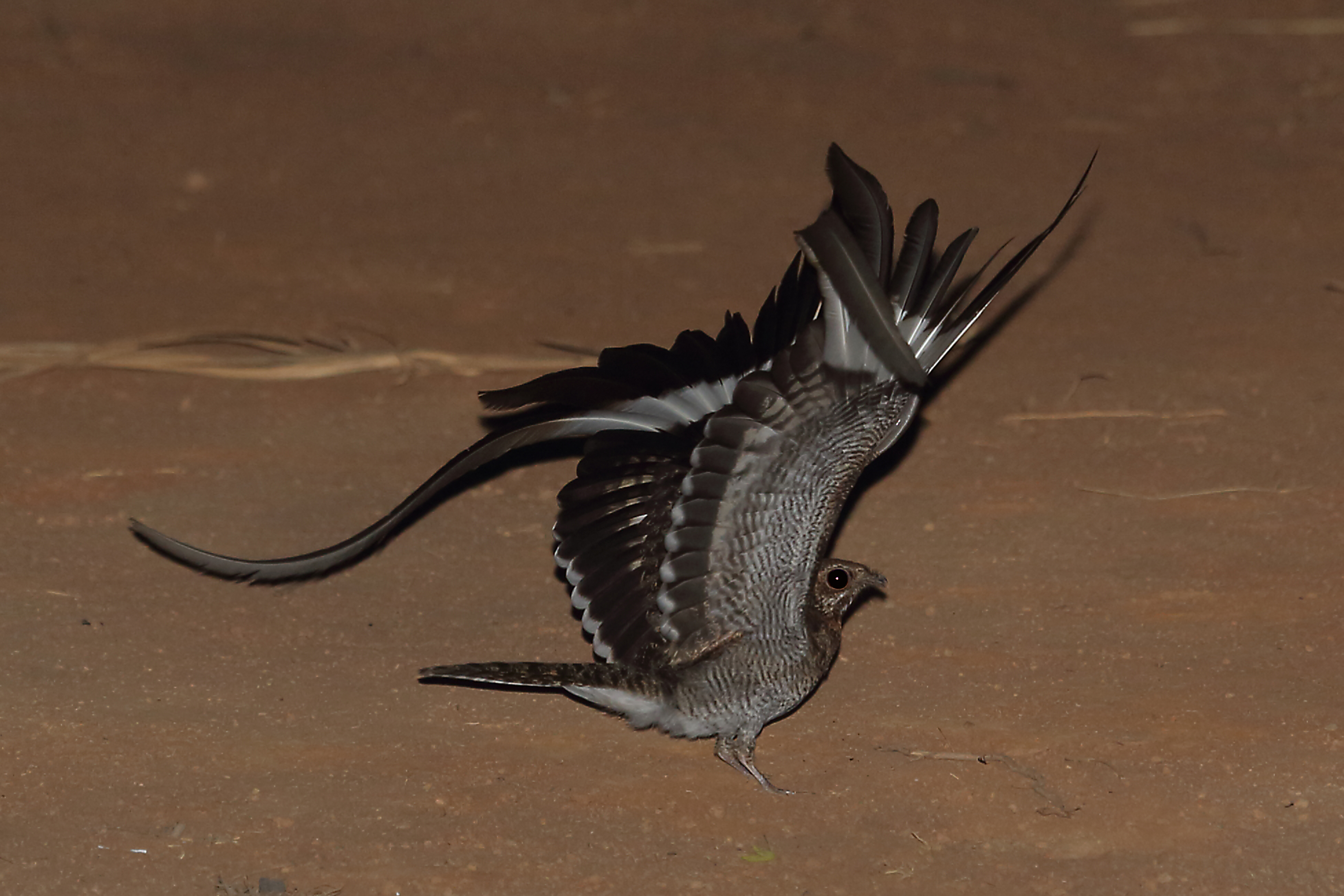
Perched male in the DRC

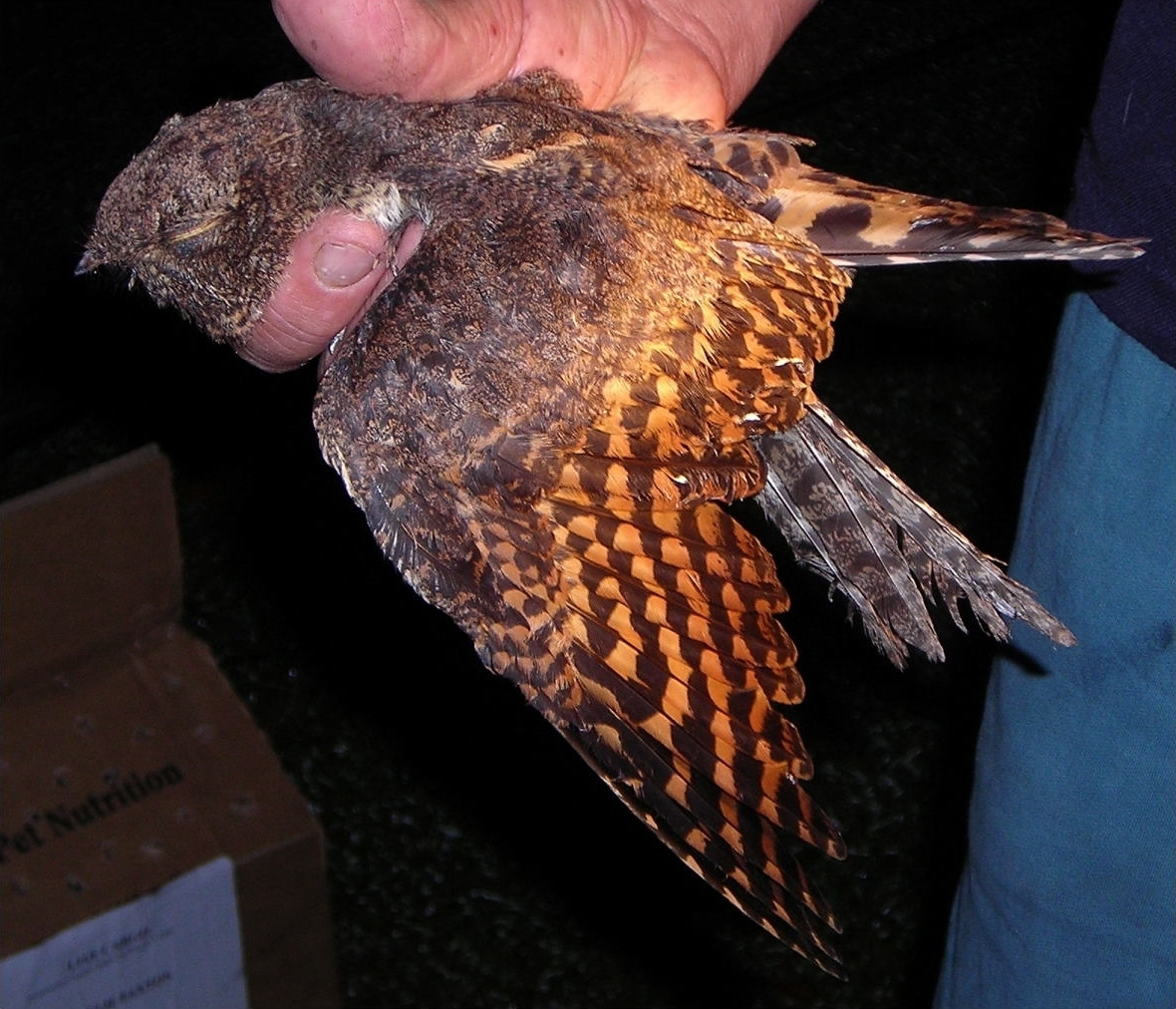
Immature male in Namibia
