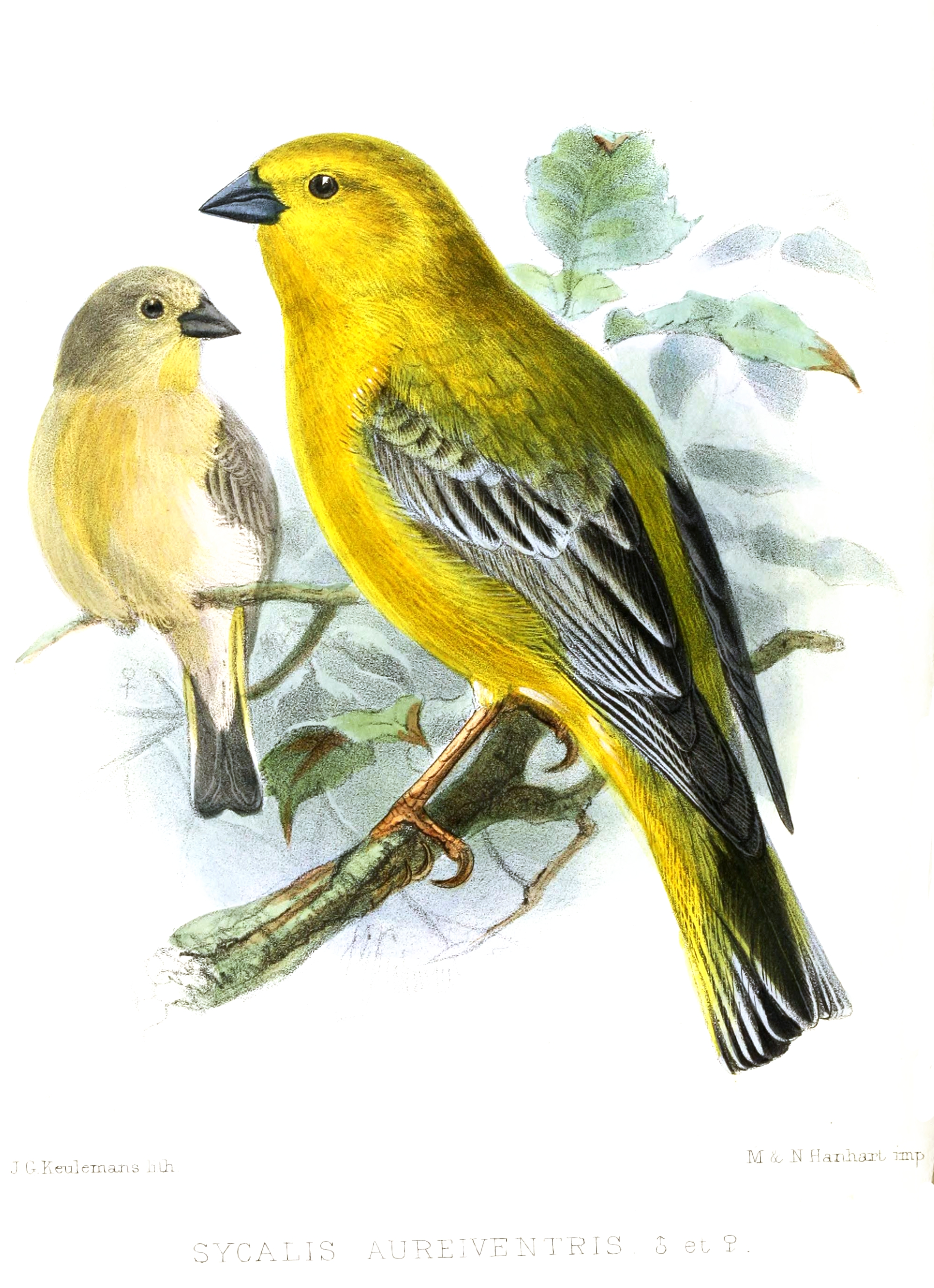

Conservation status
- Least Concern (IUCN 3.1)

Scientific classification
- Kingdom: Animalia
- Phylum: Chordata
- Class: Aves
- Order: Passeriformes
- Family: Thraupidae
- Genus: Sicalis
- Species: S. auriventris

Binomial name
- Sicalis auriventris Philippi & Landbeck, 1864

= Greater yellow finch =

Species of bird

The greater yellow finch (Sicalis auriventris) is a species of bird in the family Thraupidae. It is found in Argentina and Chile. Its natural habitats are subtropical or tropical high-altitude shrubland, temperate grassland, and heavily degraded former forest.

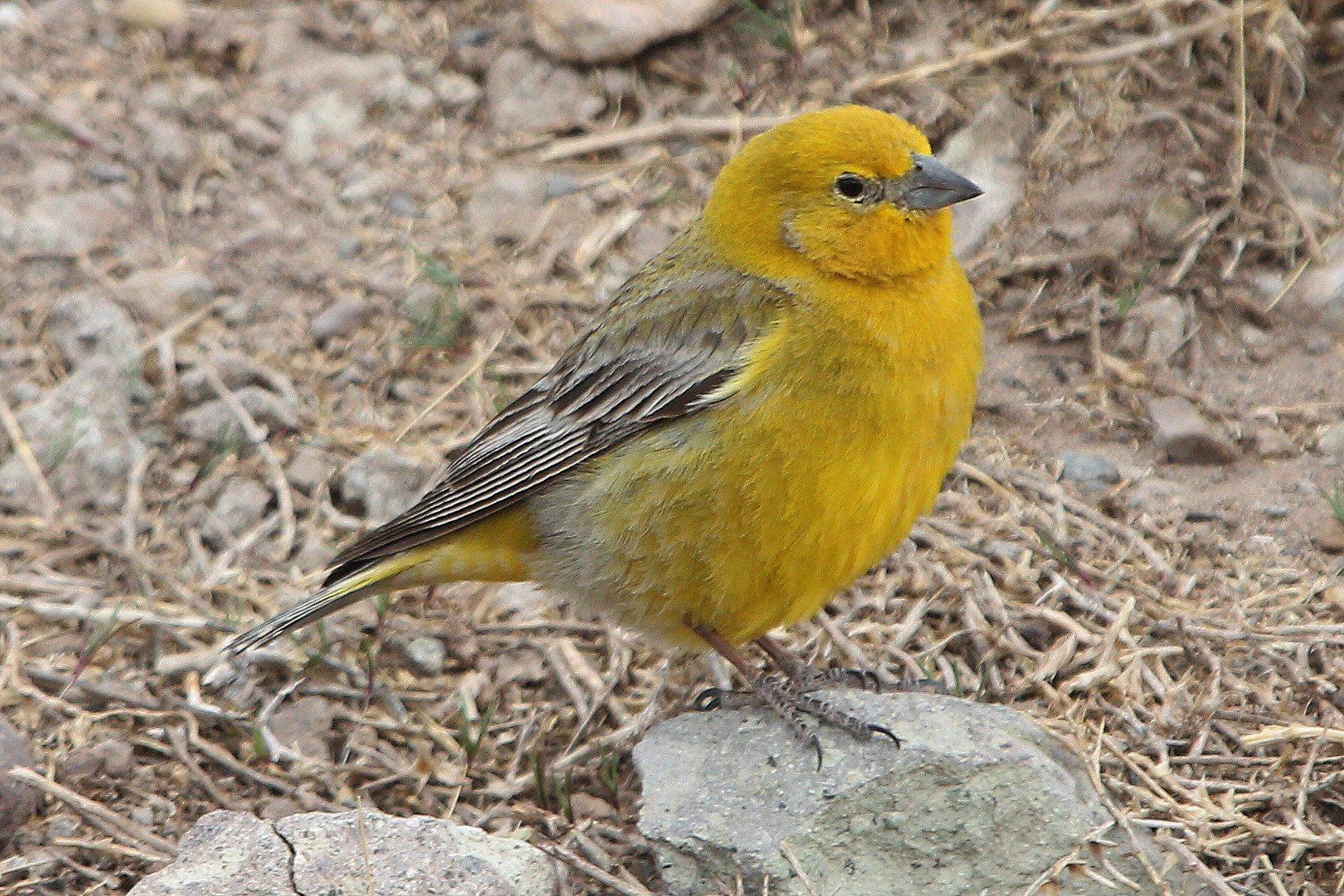
Greater yellow-finch
