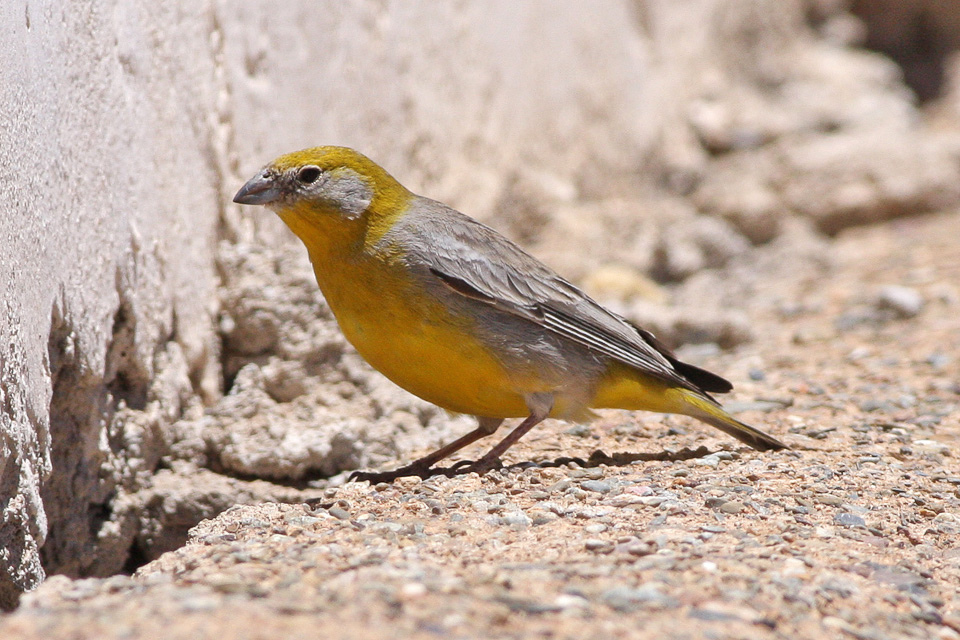

Conservation status
- Least Concern (IUCN 3.1)

Scientific classification
- Kingdom: Animalia
- Phylum: Chordata
- Class: Aves
- Order: Passeriformes
- Family: Thraupidae
- Genus: Sicalis
- Species: S. uropygialis

Binomial name
- Sicalis uropygialis (d'Orbigny & Lafresnaye, 1837)

Synonyms
- Emberiza uropigyalis

= Bright-rumped yellow finch =

Species of bird

The bright-rumped yellow finch (Sicalis uropygialis) is a species of bird in the family Thraupidae. It is found in the Puna grassland: Peru, Bolivia and northern Chile and Argentina. Its natural habitats are subtropical or tropical high-altitude grassland and heavily degraded former forest.

The bright-rumped yellow finch was formally described in 1837 by the French naturalists Alcide d'Orbigny and Frédéric de Lafresnaye from a specimen collected in the Bolivian Andes. They coined the binomial name Emberiza uropigyalis.
