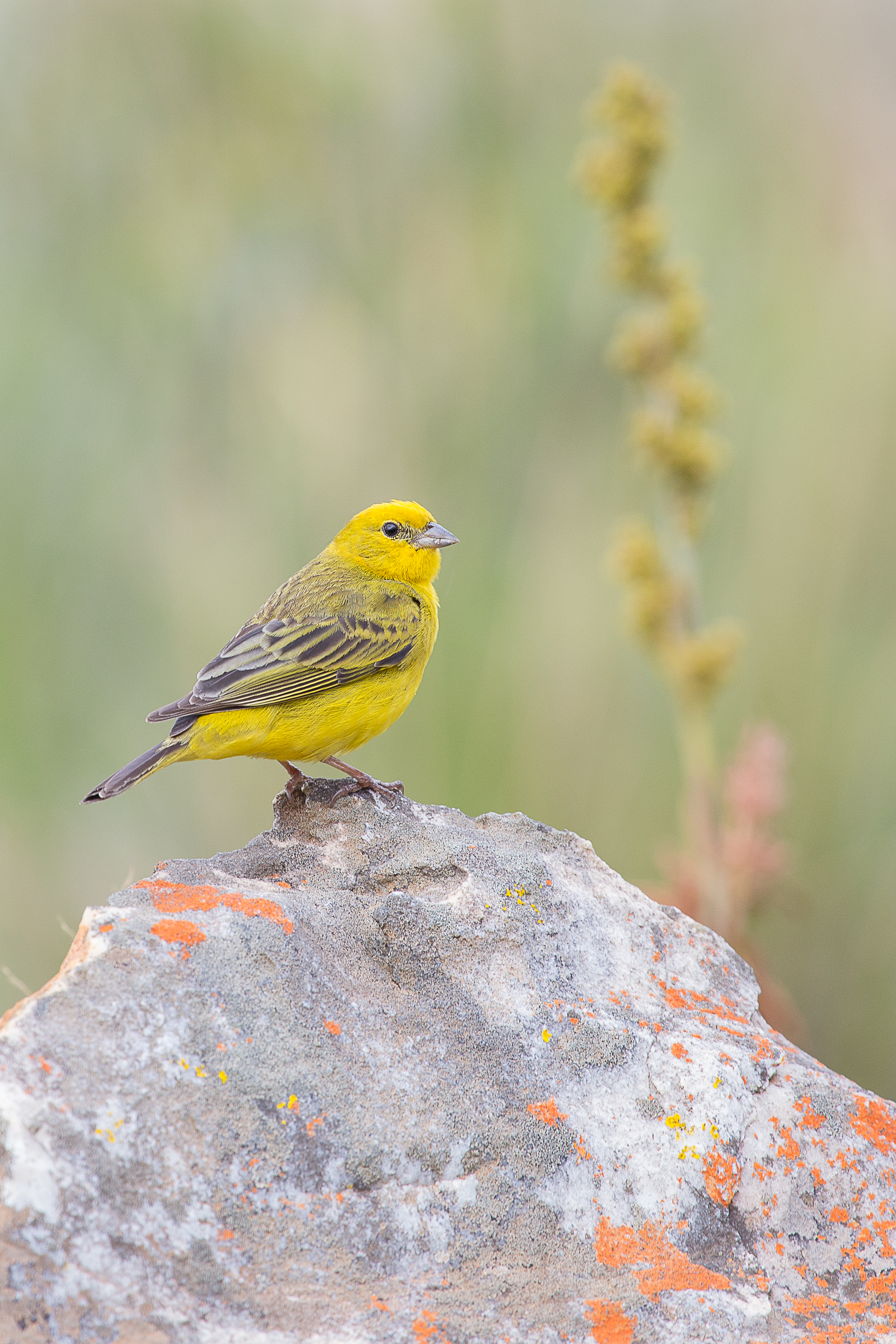
- Stripe-tailed yellow finch at Serra do Cipó, Minas Gerais State, Brazil

Conservation status
- Least Concern (IUCN 3.1)

Scientific classification
- Kingdom: Animalia
- Phylum: Chordata
- Class: Aves
- Order: Passeriformes
- Family: Thraupidae
- Genus: Sicalis
- Species: S. citrina

Binomial name
- Sicalis citrina Pelzeln, 1870

= Stripe-tailed yellow finch =

Species of bird

The stripe-tailed yellow finch (Sicalis citrina) is a species of bird in the family Thraupidae. It is found in Argentina, Bolivia, Brazil, Colombia, Guyana, Paraguay, Peru, Suriname, and Venezuela. Its natural habitats are dry savanna and pastureland.
