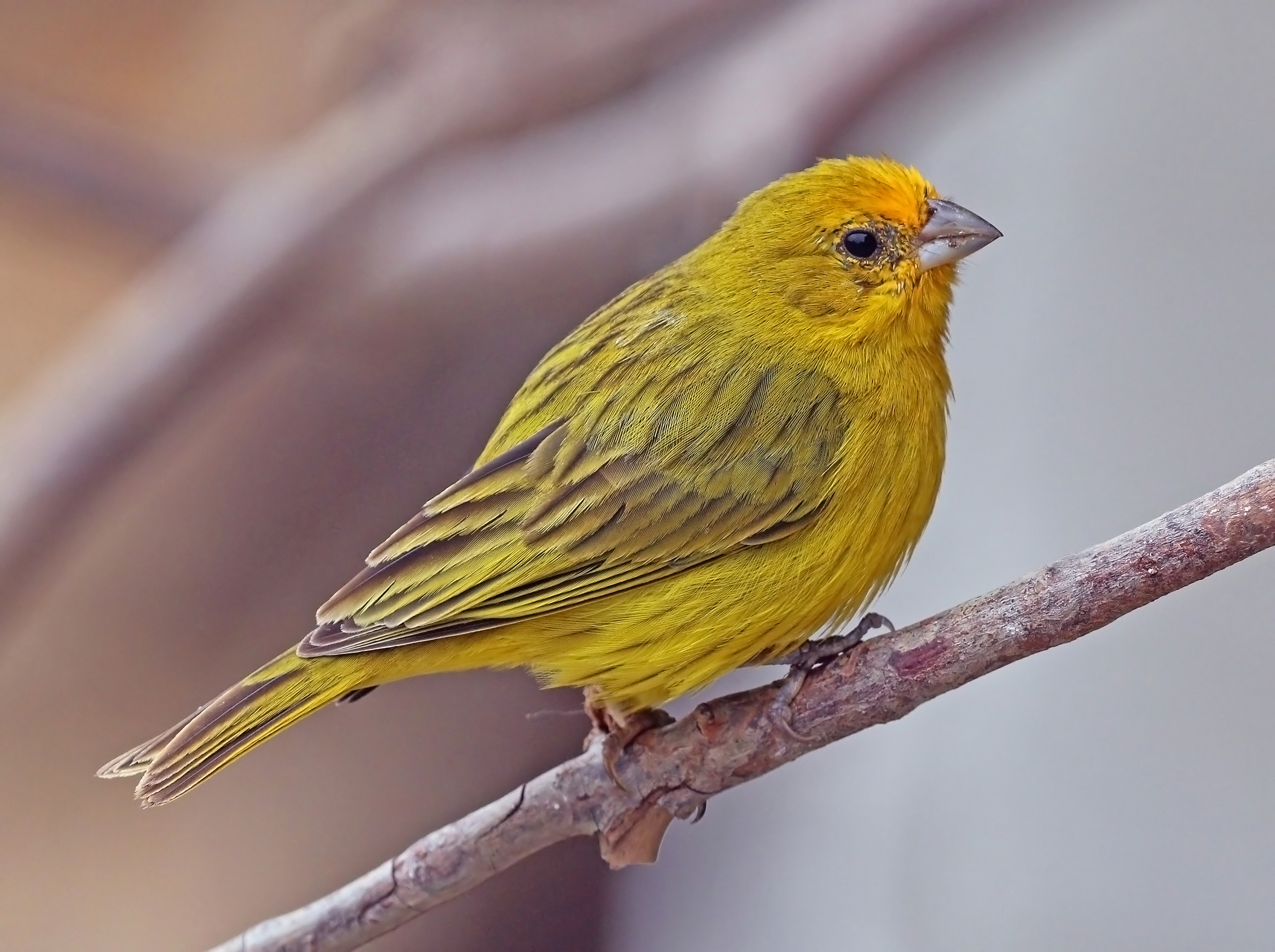
- Male (pelzelni ssp.), Brazil
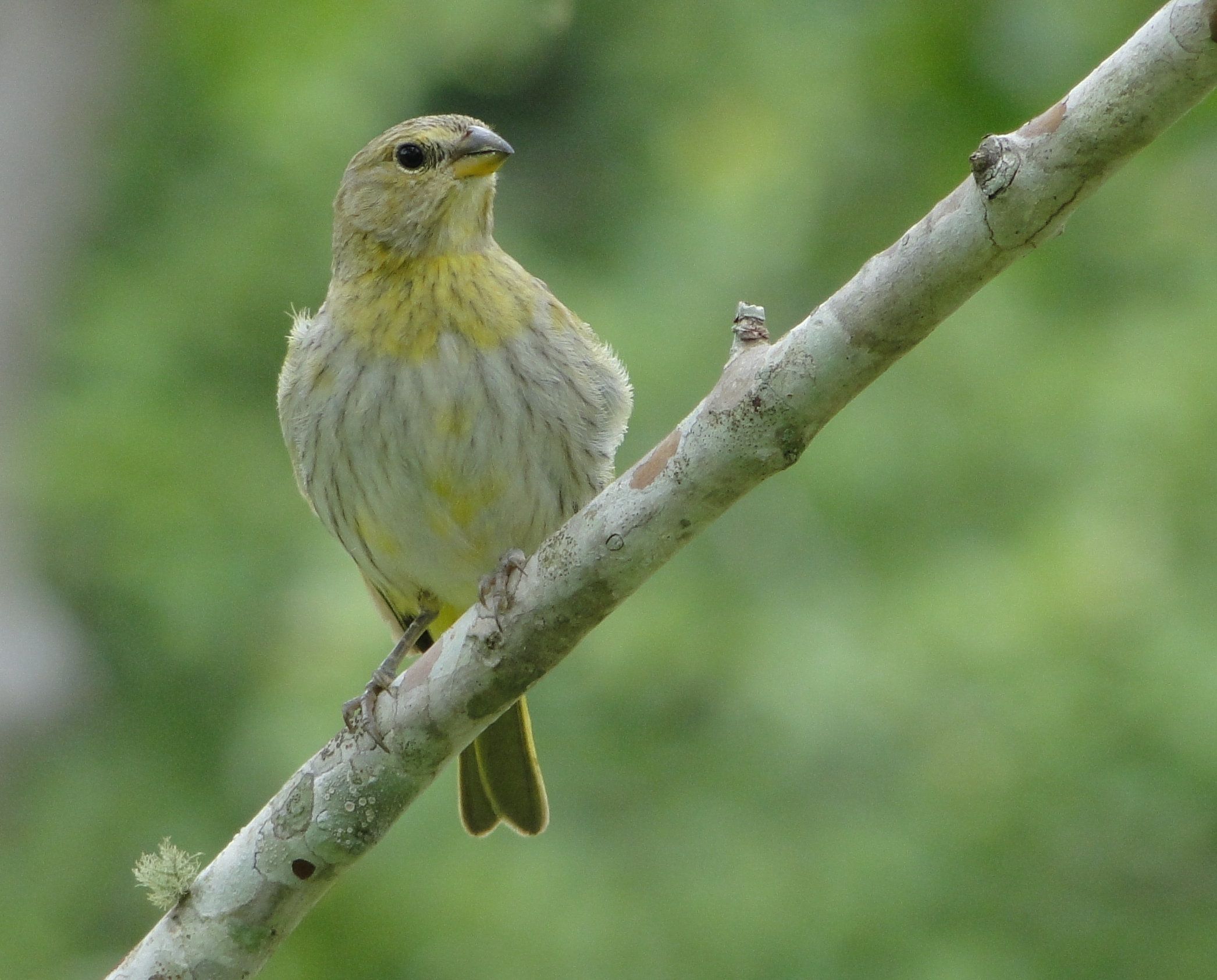
- Female Song

Conservation status
- Least Concern (IUCN 3.1)

Scientific classification
- Kingdom: Animalia
- Phylum: Chordata
- Class: Aves
- Order: Passeriformes
- Family: Thraupidae
- Genus: Sicalis
- Species: S. flaveola

Binomial name
- Sicalis flaveola (Linnaeus, 1766)

Synonyms
- Fringilla flaveola Linnaeus, 1766

= Saffron finch =

Species of bird

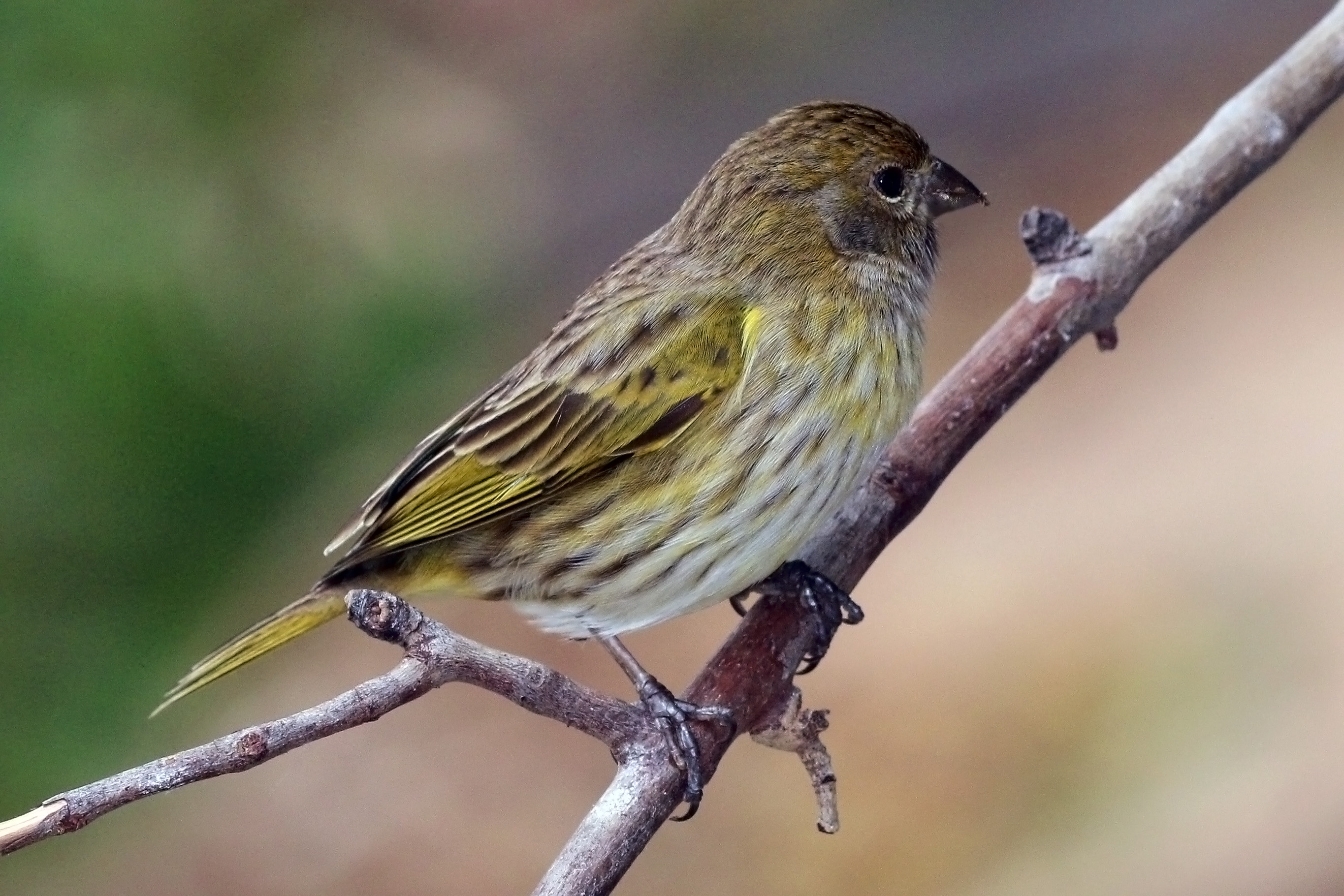
Juvenile male in the Pantanal, Brazil

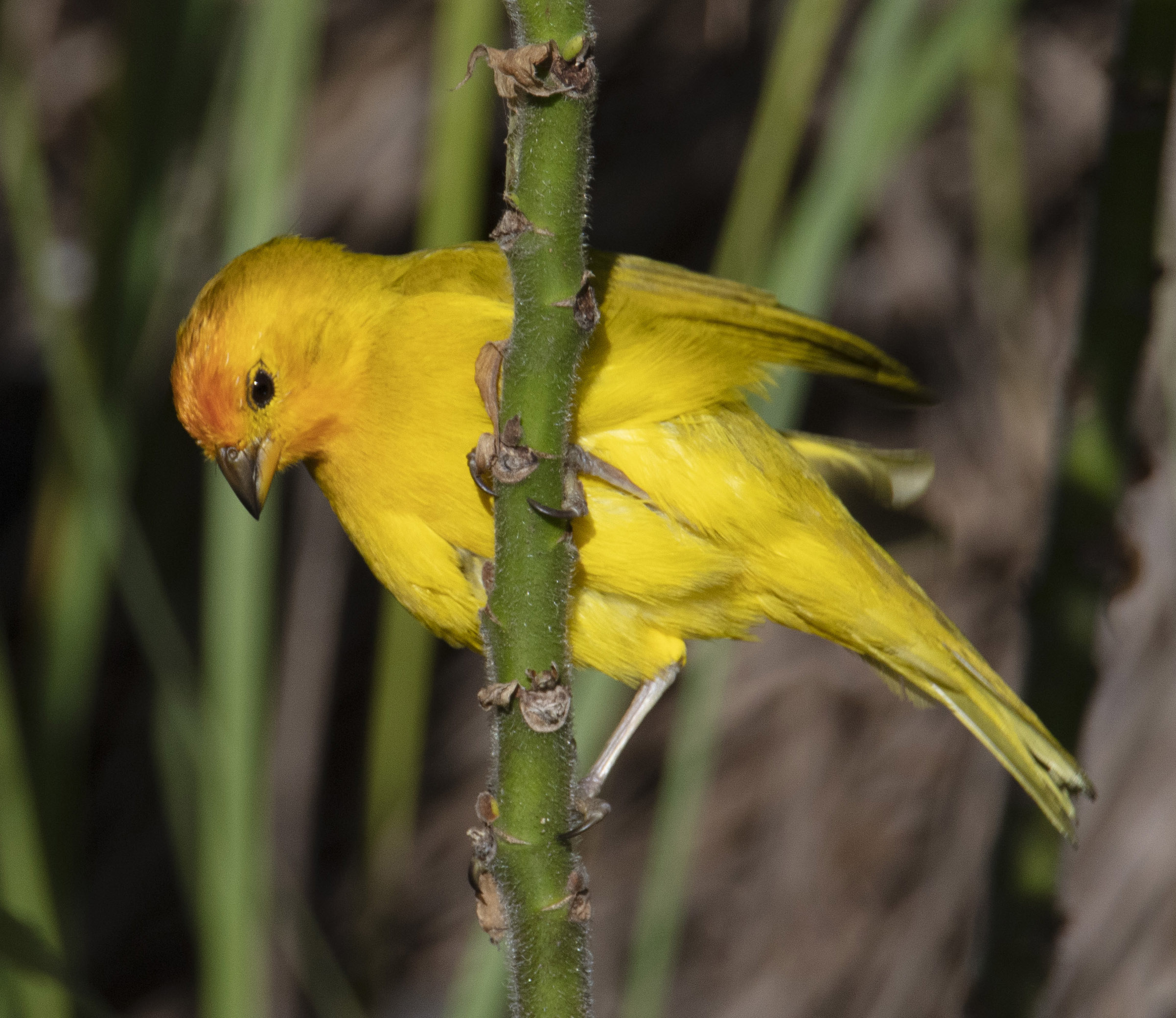
A male Saffron Finch (flaveola ssp.) introduced to Hawaii

The saffron finch (Sicalis flaveola) is a tanager from South America that is common in open and semi-open areas in lowlands outside the Amazon Basin. They have a wide distribution in Colombia, northern Venezuela (where it is called "canario de tejado" or "roof canary"), western Ecuador, western Peru, eastern and southern Brazil (where it is called "canário-da-terra" or "native canary"), Bolivia, Paraguay, Uruguay, northern Argentina, and Trinidad and Tobago. It has also been introduced to Hawaii, Panama, Puerto Rico, Jamaica and elsewhere. Although commonly regarded as a canary, it is not related to the Atlantic canary. Formerly, it was placed in the Emberizidae but it is close to the seedeaters.

== Taxonomy ==
The saffron finch was formally described in 1766 by the Swedish naturalist Carl Linnaeus in the 12th edition of his Systema Naturae under the binomial name Fringilla flaveola. The specific epithet is a diminutive of the Latin flavus meaning "golden" or "yellow". The type locality is Suriname. The saffron finch is now placed in the genus Sicalis that was introduced in 1828 by the German zoologist Friedrich Boie.

Five subspecies are recognised:

- S. f. flaveola (Linnaeus, 1766) – Trinidad, Colombia, Venezuela and the Guianas
- S. f. valida Bangs & Penard, TE, 1921 – Ecuador and northwest Peru
- S. f. brasiliensis (Gmelin, JF, 1789) – east Brazil
- S. f. pelzelni Sclater, PL, 1872 – east Bolivia, Paraguay, southeast Brazil, north Argentina and Uruguay
- S. f. koenigi Hoy, G, 1978 – northwest Argentina

== Description ==
The male is bright yellow with an orange crown which distinguishes it from most other yellow finches (the exception being the orange-fronted yellow finch). The females are more difficult to identify and are usually just a slightly duller version of the male, but in the southern subspecies S. f. pelzelni they are olive-brown with heavy dark streaks.

== Breeding ==
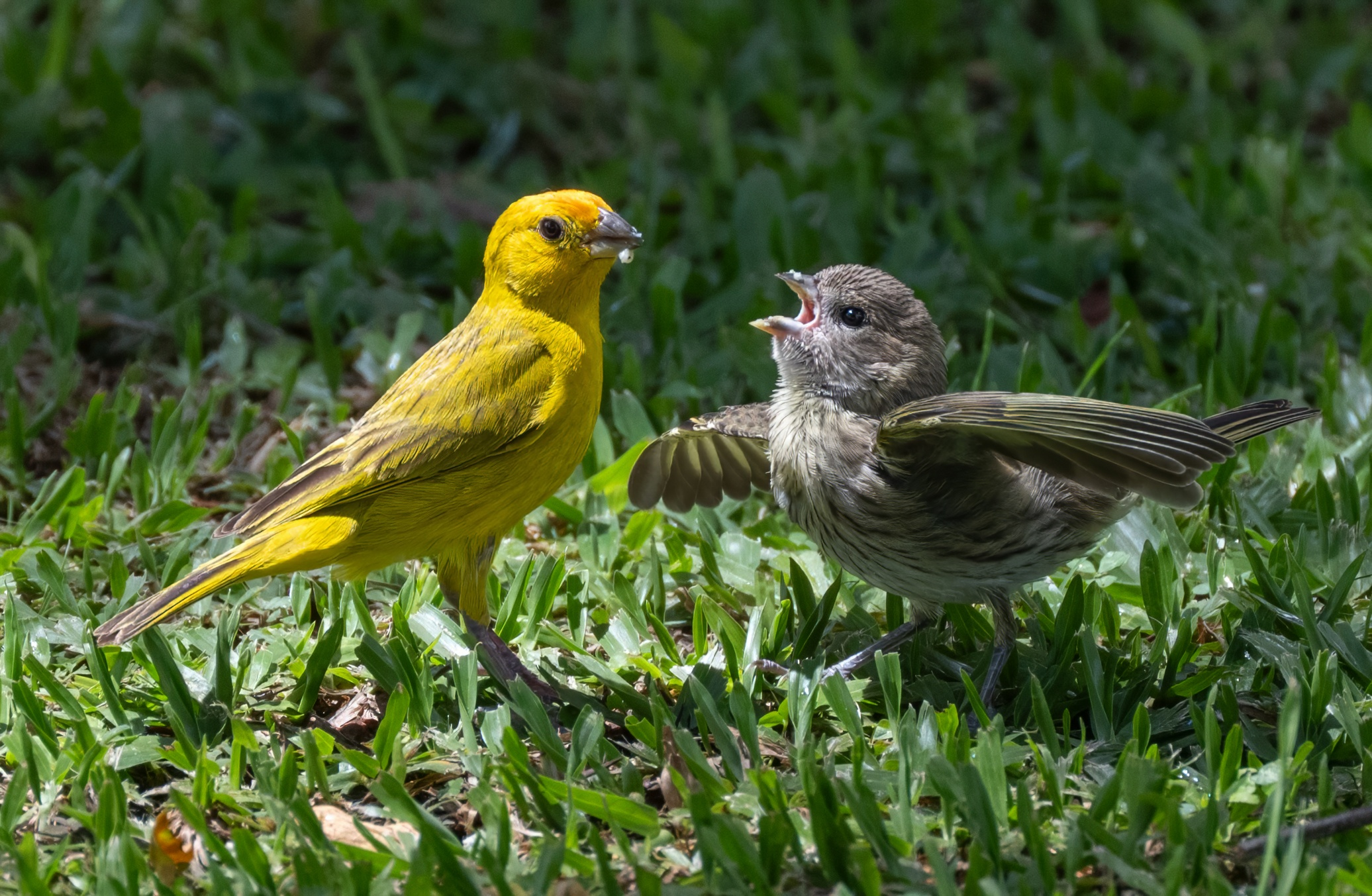
An adult saffron finch feeding a youngster

Typically nesting in cavities, the saffron finch makes use of sites such as abandoned rufous hornero (Furnarius rufus) nests, bamboo branches and under house roofs - this species is tolerant of human proximity, appearing at suburban areas and frequenting bird tables. They have a pleasant but repetitious song which, combined with their appearance, has led to them being kept as caged birds in many areas. Males are polygamous, mating with two females during the nesting season, and territorial, which has led to the species being used for blood sporting with two males put in a cage in order to fight.
