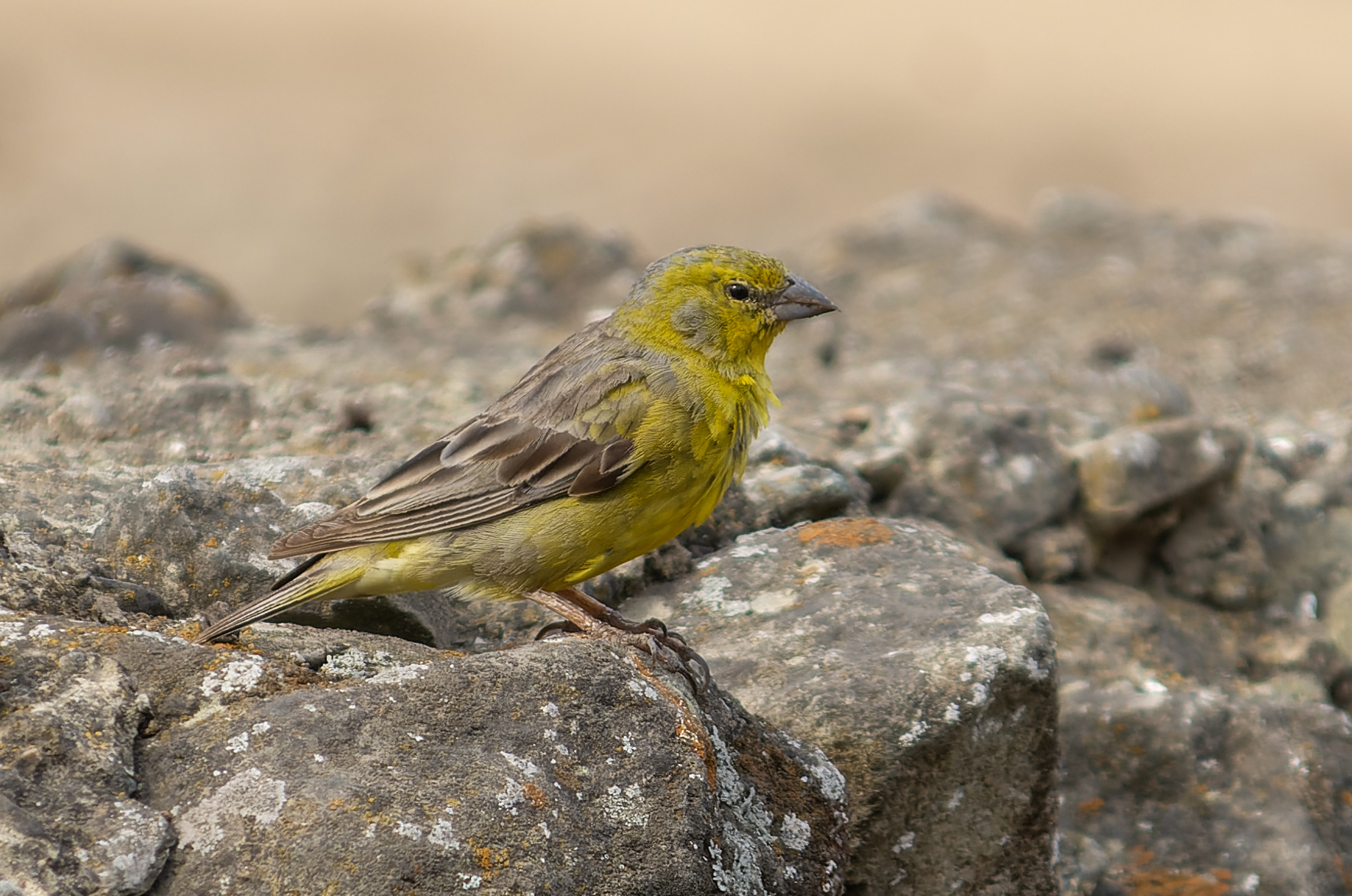

Conservation status
- Least Concern (IUCN 3.1)

Scientific classification
- Kingdom: Animalia
- Phylum: Chordata
- Class: Aves
- Order: Passeriformes
- Family: Thraupidae
- Genus: Sicalis
- Species: S. raimondii

Binomial name
- Sicalis raimondii Taczanowski, 1874

= Raimondi's yellow finch =

Species of bird

Raimondi's yellow finch (Sicalis raimondii) is a species of bird in the family Thraupidae. It is endemic to coastal Peru. Its natural habitats are subtropical or tropical dry shrubland and subtropical or tropical high-altitude shrubland.
