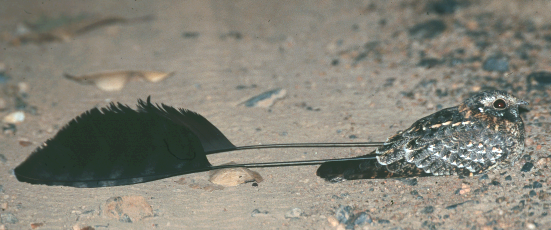
- Standard-winged nightjar
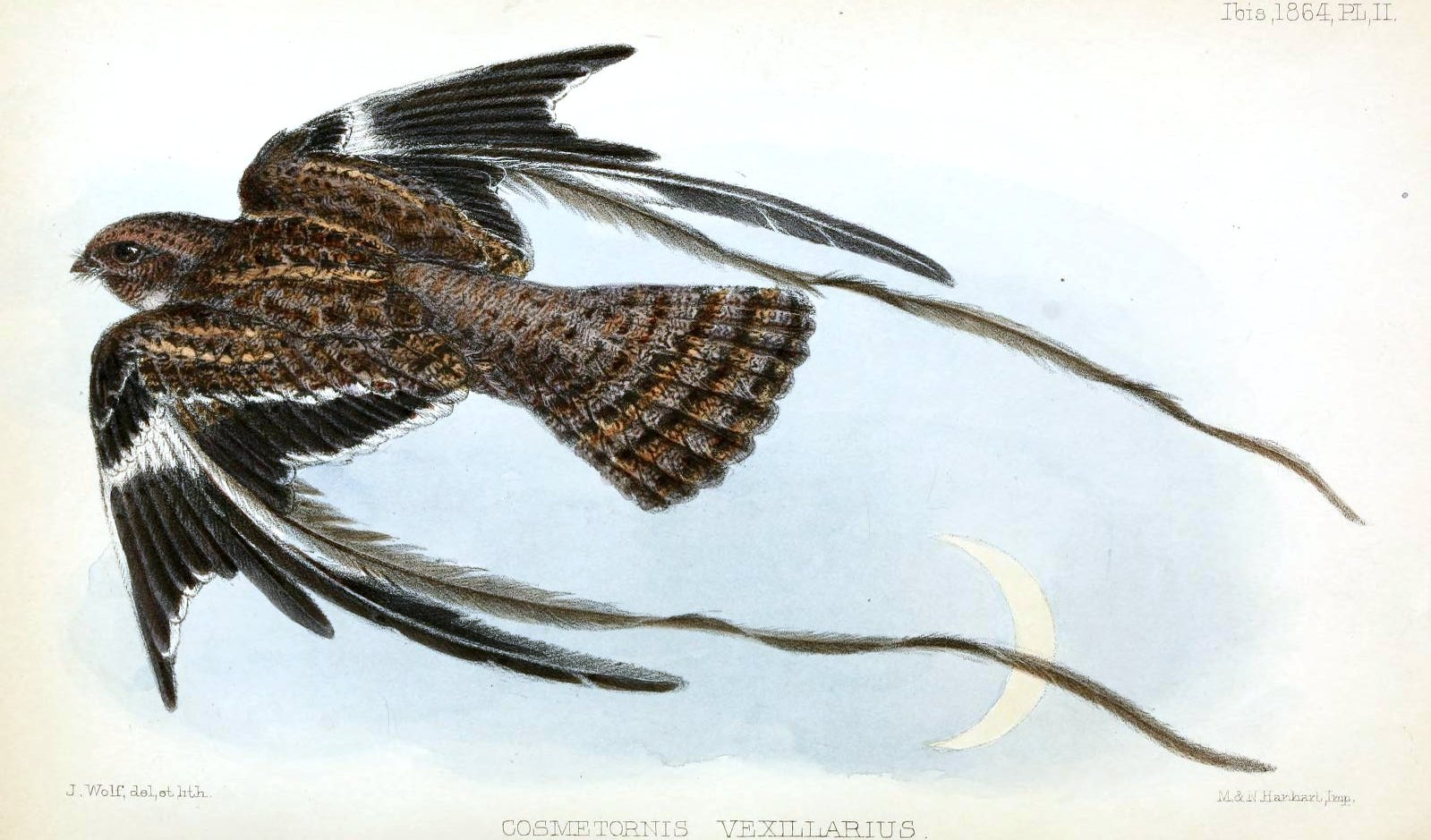
- Pennant-winged nightjar

Scientific classification
- Kingdom: Animalia
- Phylum: Chordata
- Class: Aves
- Order: Caprimulgiformes
- Family: Caprimulgidae
- Subfamily: Caprimulginae
- Genus: Macrodipteryx; Swainson, 1837

= Macrodipteryx =

Genus of birds

Macrodipteryx is a genus of African nightjars consisting of two species: the pennant-winged nightjar and the standard-winged nightjar. They inhabit subtropical woodlands, and the males of both species acquire strikingly elongated primaries in the breeding season. However, the former genus is now considered to be a synonym of Caprimulgus Linnaeus, 1758.

In the standard-winged nightjar the shaft of the second primary becomes much elongated, while in the pennant-winged nightjar the second primary grows to more than twice the body length. Both species have an insect-like call in the breeding season, but are silent in the non-breeding season. The primaries of the females and immature males are boldly barred in rufous and brown. Both the wing and remige shapes differ from other African nightjars, the primaries being without clear emargination.

The breeding ranges and seasons of the two species do not overlap. The standard-winged nightjar disperses southwards for breeding in the late Northern Hemisphere winter, while the pennant-winged nightjar crosses the equator southwards to breed in the early Southern Hemisphere summer.
