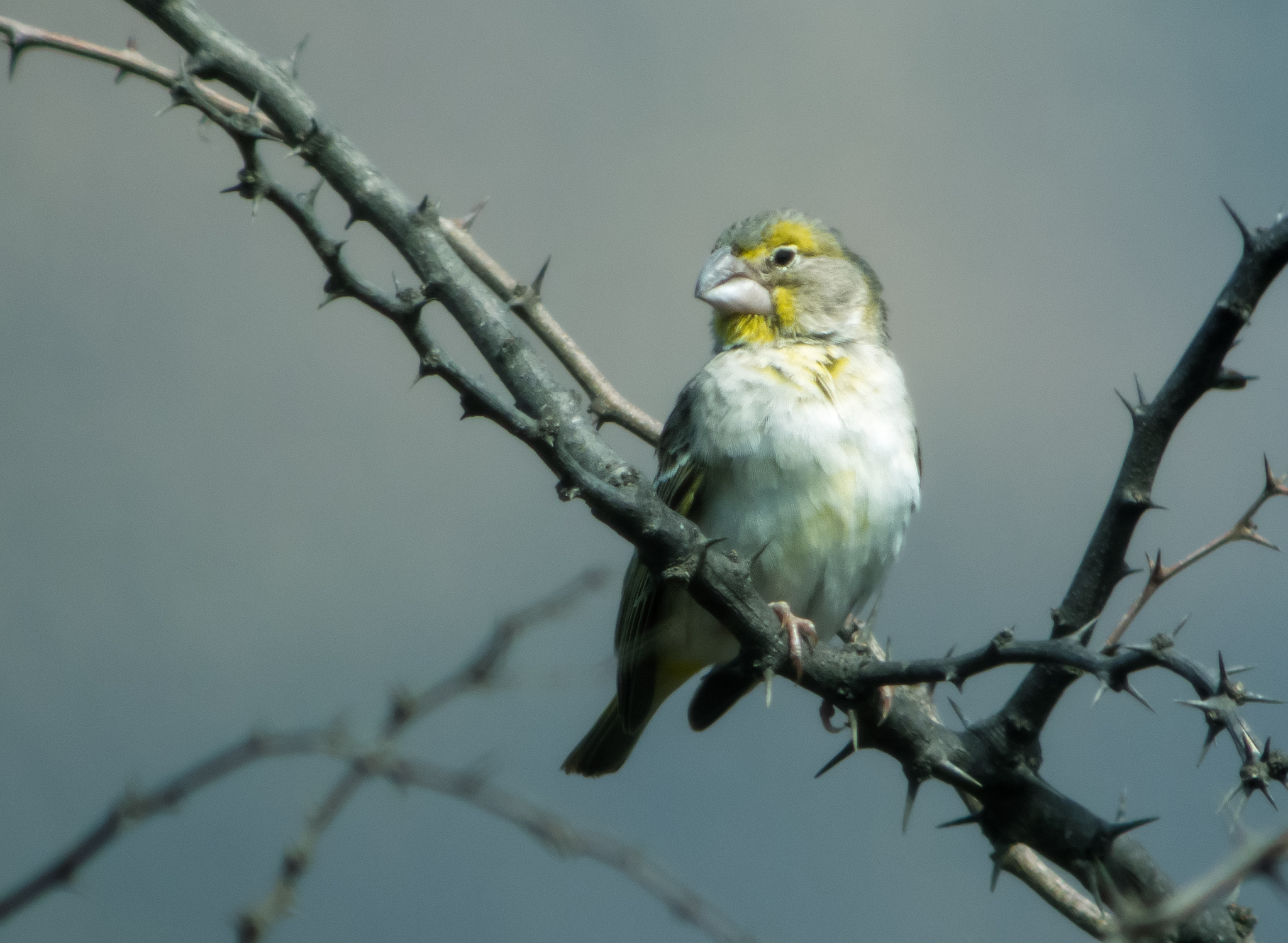

Conservation status
- Least Concern (IUCN 3.1)

Scientific classification
- Kingdom: Animalia
- Phylum: Chordata
- Class: Aves
- Order: Passeriformes
- Family: Thraupidae
- Genus: Sicalis
- Species: S. taczanowskii

Binomial name
- Sicalis taczanowskii Sharpe, 1888

= Sulphur-throated finch =

Species of bird

The sulphur-throated finch (Sicalis taczanowskii) is a species of bird in the family Thraupidae. It is found in Ecuador and Peru. Its natural habitat is subtropical or tropical dry shrubland.
