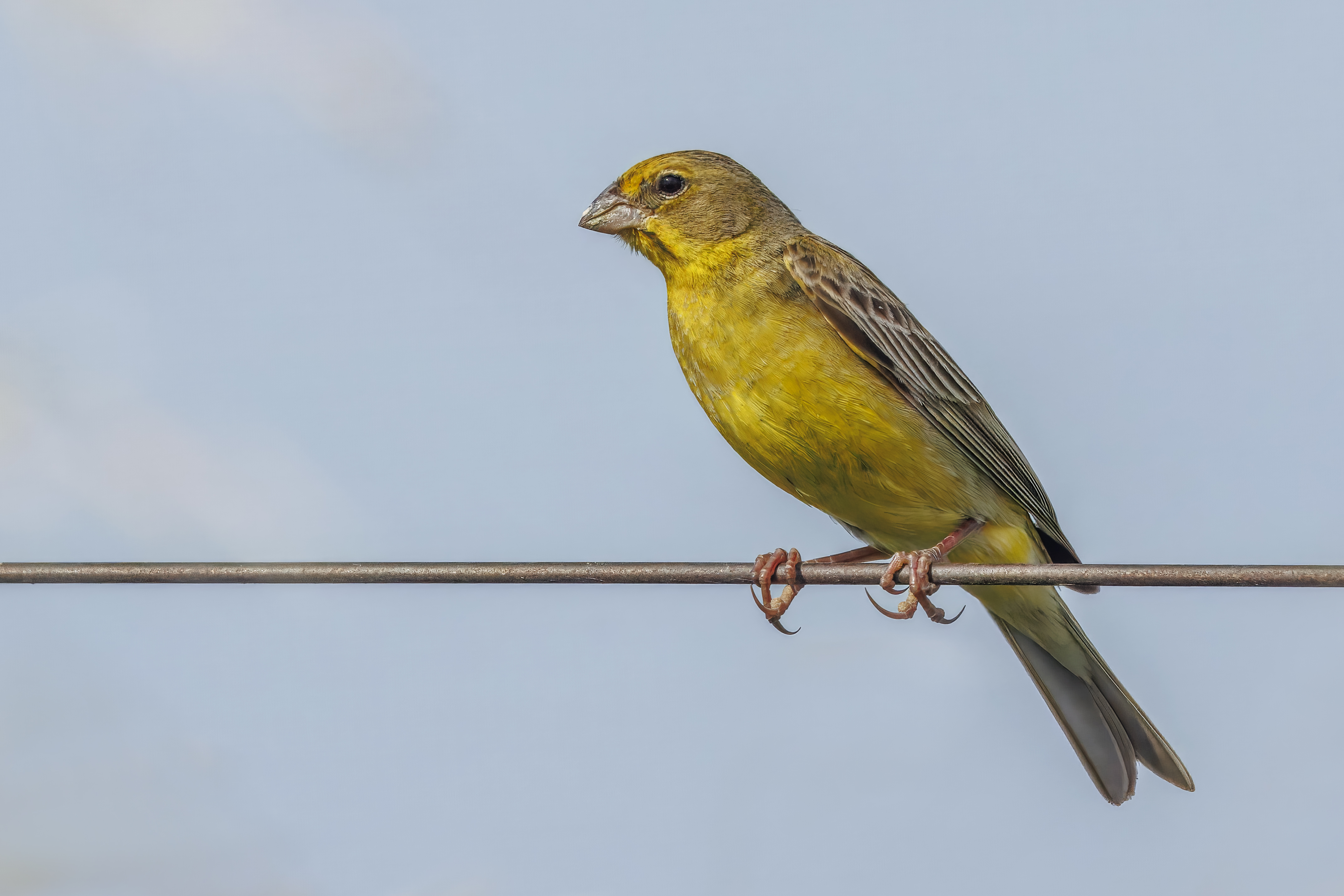
- in Colonia, Uruguay

Conservation status
- Least Concern (IUCN 3.1)

Scientific classification
- Kingdom: Animalia
- Phylum: Chordata
- Class: Aves
- Order: Passeriformes
- Family: Thraupidae
- Genus: Sicalis
- Species: S. luteola

Binomial name
- Sicalis luteola (Sparrman, 1789)

Synonyms
- Sicalis luteiventris

= Grassland yellow finch =

Species of bird

The grassland yellow finch (Sicalis luteola) is a small passerine bird. Despite its name, it is not a finch, but is a seedeater. These were formerly united with the buntings and American sparrows in the Emberizidae, but are now known to be tanagers.

It is a resident in tropical South America, from Colombia south and east to the Guianas and central Ecuador, Peru and Brazil. Birds which breed further south in Argentina and Uruguay migrate to Bolivia and southern Brazil, (the cerrado etc.), in the austral winter. There are also isolated populations in Central America and Mexico. It was discovered on Trinidad in 2004, presumably having colonised from nearby Venezuela. Also known from Barbados, certainly since 1960 if not earlier.

The grassland yellow finch, as its name implies, is found in fields and other open grassland. The female lays 3 brown-speckled pale blue-green eggs in a grassy cup nest in tall grass, and several pairs may breed close to each other in suitable areas.

The grassland yellow finch is about 12 cm long and weighs 13 g. The males have bright yellow underparts and rump, and olive yellow upperparts. The crown and nape have dark streaking, and there is yellow around the eye. Females have dark-streaked pale brown upperparts and dull yellow underparts. The call is a sharp te-tsip, and the male's song, given from a perch or in a display flight, is a series of chips, buzzes and trills.

Grassland yellow finches eat seeds and insects, and are usually seen in pairs or small groups.
