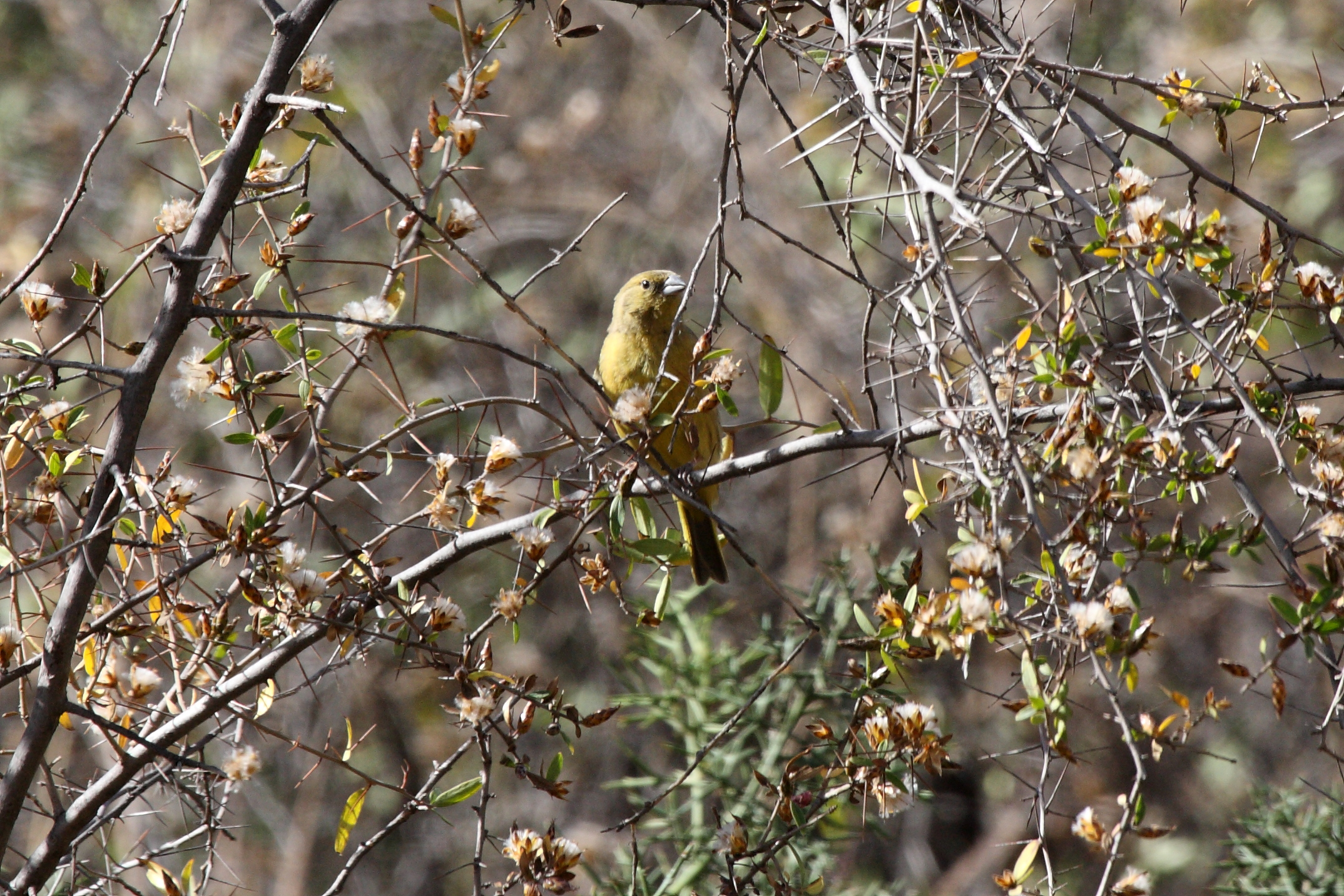

Conservation status
- Least Concern (IUCN 3.1)

Scientific classification
- Kingdom: Animalia
- Phylum: Chordata
- Class: Aves
- Order: Passeriformes
- Family: Thraupidae
- Genus: Sicalis
- Species: S. olivascens

Binomial name
- Sicalis olivascens (D'Orbigny & Lafresnaye, 1837)

= Greenish yellow finch =

Species of bird

The greenish yellow finch (Sicalis olivascens) is a species of bird in the family Thraupidae. It is found in the central Andes of Argentina, Bolivia, Chile and Peru. Its natural habitats are subtropical or tropical high-altitude shrubland and heavily degraded former forest.
