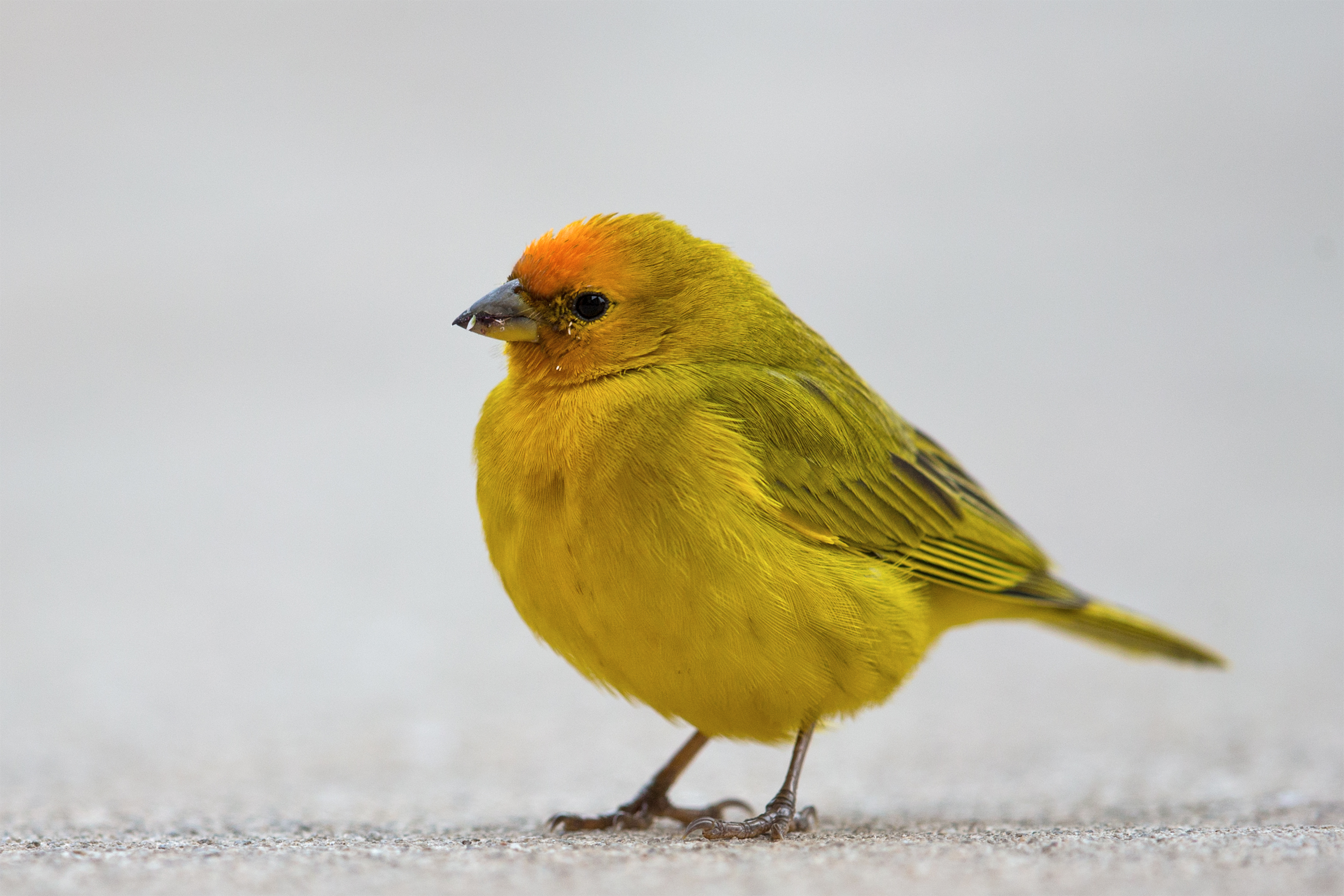
- Male near Belo Horizonte, Brazil

Conservation status
- Least Concern (IUCN 3.1)

Scientific classification
- Kingdom: Animalia
- Phylum: Chordata
- Class: Aves
- Order: Passeriformes
- Family: Thraupidae
- Genus: Sicalis
- Species: S. columbiana

Binomial name
- Sicalis columbiana Cabanis, 1851

= Orange-fronted yellow finch =

Species of bird

The orange-fronted yellow finch (Sicalis columbiana) is a species of South American bird in the family Thraupidae. It has a highly disjunct distribution with S. c. columbiana found in Colombia and Venezuela, S. c. goeldii along the Amazon River in Brazil, and S. c. goeldii in east-central Brazil. It is found in semi-open areas, typically near water and sometimes near humans. The male closely resembles the saffron finch, but it is smaller, has a more contrasting orange front, and dusky lores. The female is overall olive-gray with whitish underparts, and yellow to the wings and tail.
