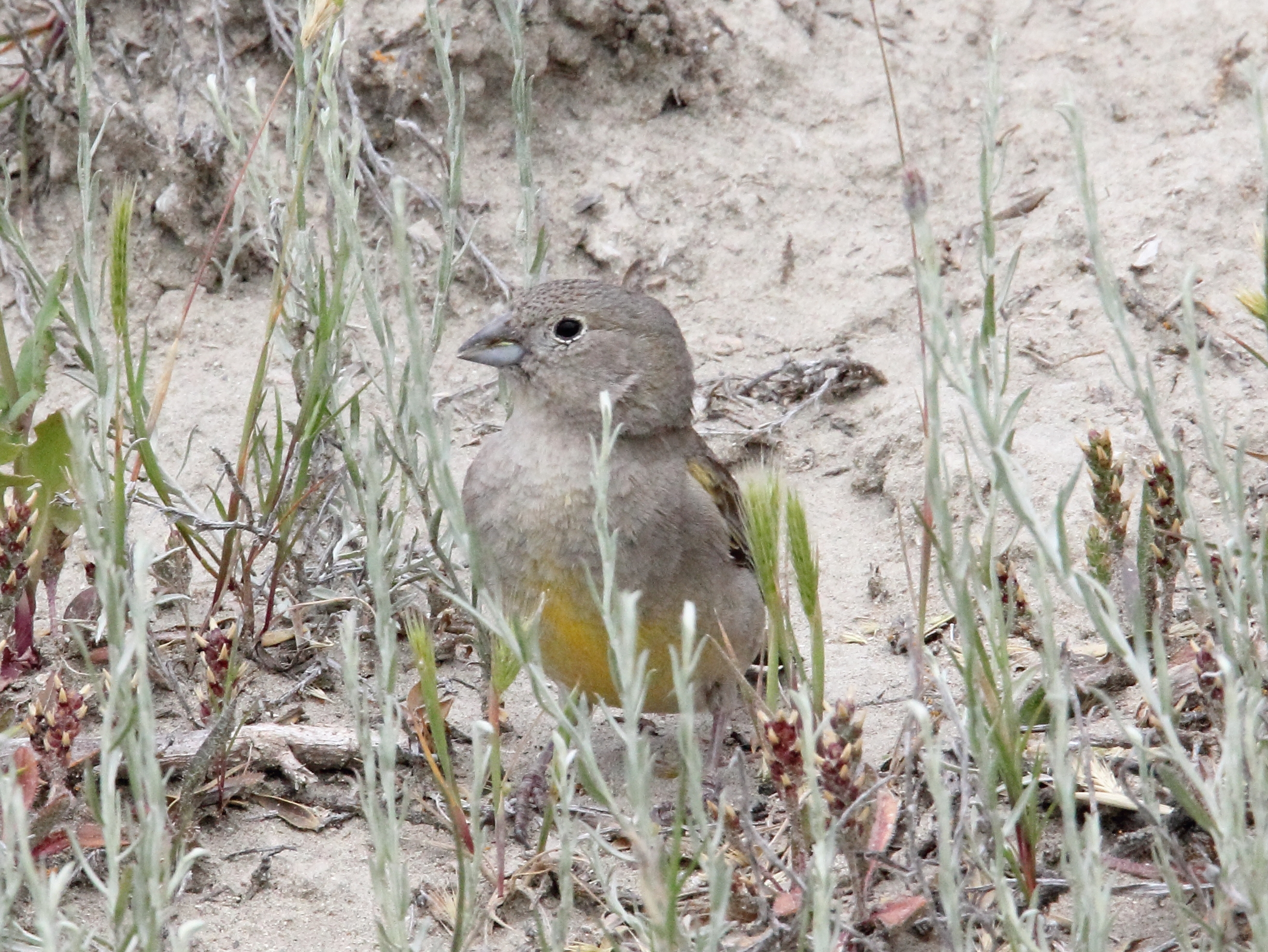

Conservation status
- Least Concern (IUCN 3.1)

Scientific classification
- Kingdom: Animalia
- Phylum: Chordata
- Class: Aves
- Order: Passeriformes
- Family: Thraupidae
- Genus: Sicalis
- Species: S. lebruni

Binomial name
- Sicalis lebruni (Oustalet, 1891)

= Patagonian yellow finch =

Species of bird

The Patagonian yellow finch (Sicalis lebruni) is a species of bird in the family Thraupidae. It is found in Patagonia and Tierra del Fuego in southern Argentina and Chile. Its natural habitats are subtropical or tropical dry shrubland and temperate grassland.

== Range ==
The Patagonian yellow finch's range is in the southern half of Argentina, both in the eastern and central regions. To the south, the range covers the northern half of Tierra del Fuego, and the contiguous areas of extreme southern Chile.
