= Skylarking (birds) =

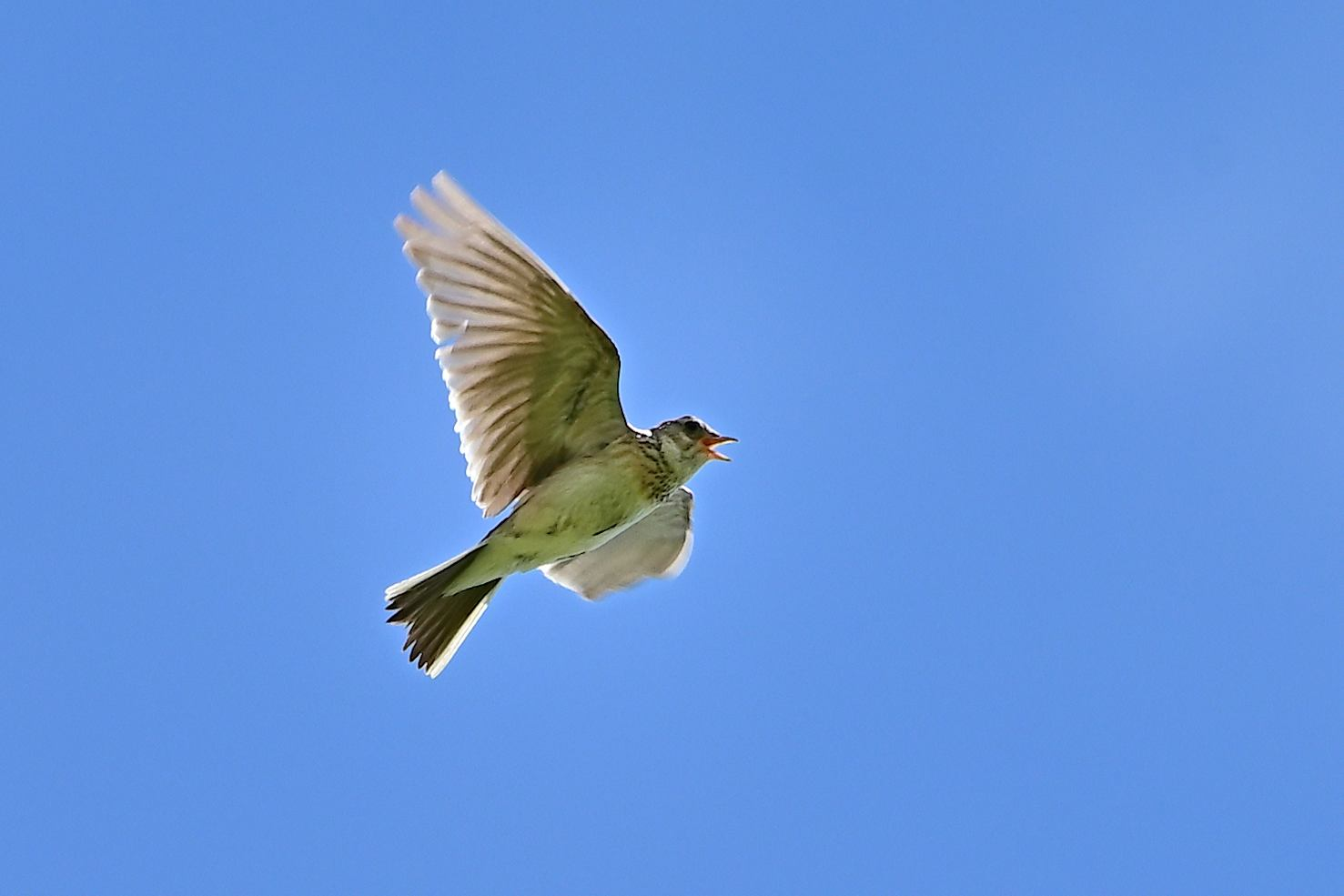
Eurasian skylark (Alauda arvensis) displaying "skylarking" behavior.

Skylarking refers to the aerial displays including song made by various species of birds, such as Cassin's sparrow (Peterson 1990). Many skylarking displays are in courtship. Some are referred to as territorial displays by the male. There are some instances in which birdwatchers claim that skylarking has been used by male birds to avoid predators; the objective being that the predator will mistake the prey for another type of bird and end the pursuit. This survival tactic rarely works.
