= List of birds of Chile =

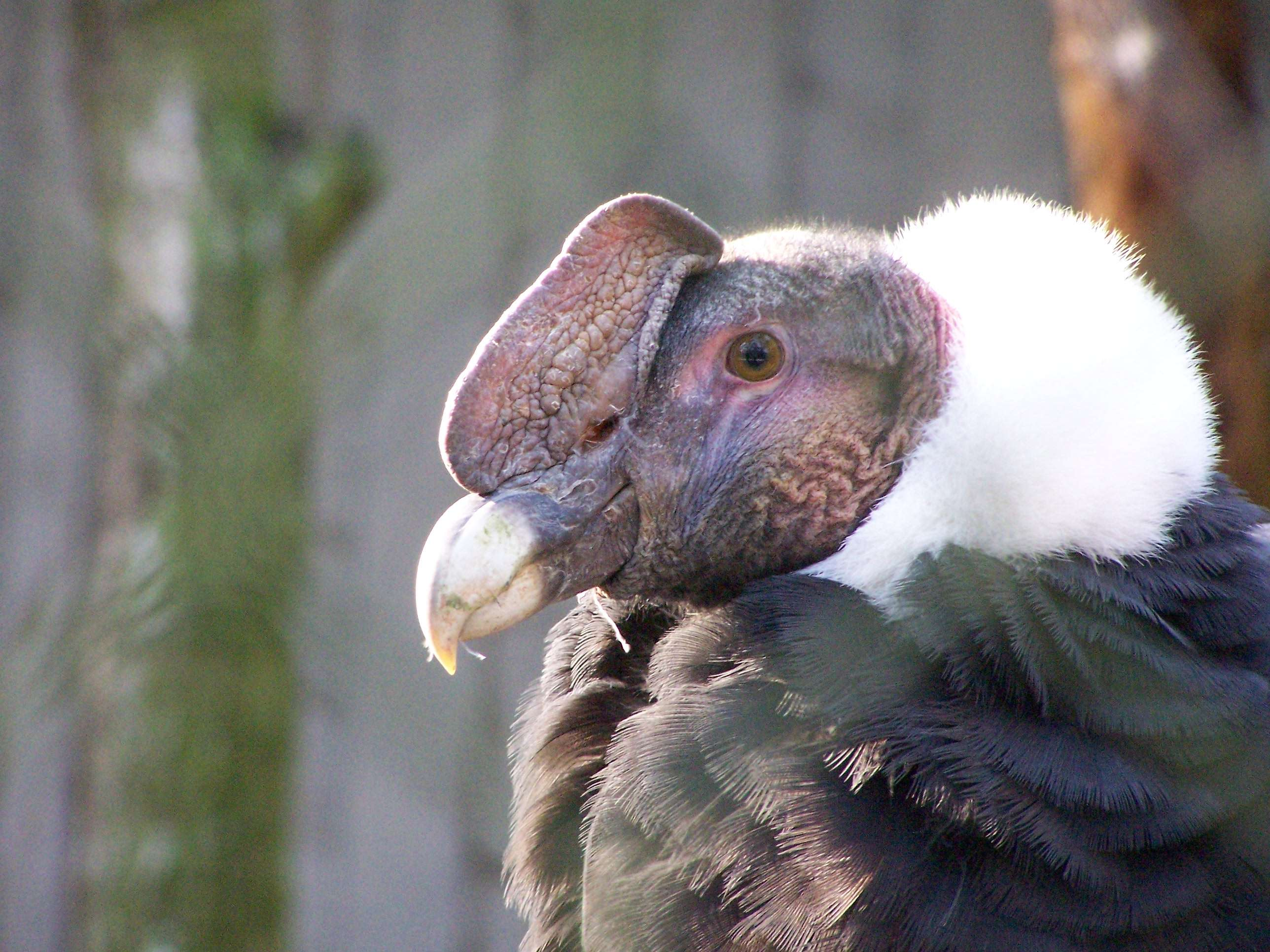
The Andean condor is the national bird of Chile.

This is a list of the bird species recorded in Chile. Unless otherwise noted, the list is that of the South American Classification Committee (SACC) of the American Ornithological Society. The SACC list includes species recorded in mainland Chile, on the Chilean islands of the Cape Horn area, on other islands and waters near the mainland, and on and around the Juan Fernández Islands. The list's taxonomic treatment (designation and sequence of orders, families, and species) and nomenclature (common and scientific names) are also those of the SACC.

According to the SACC, the avifauna of Chile has 526 confirmed species, of which 12 are endemic, 128 are rare or vagrants, six have been introduced by humans, and one is extinct. An additional seven species are unconfirmed (see below). Thirty-five of the species on the Chilean SACC list are globally threatened.

The following tags have been used to highlight several categories.

- (V) Vagrant - a species that rarely or accidentally occurs in Chile
- (E) Endemic - a species endemic to Chile
- (I) Introduced - a species introduced to Chile as a consequence, direct or indirect, of human actions
- (U) Unconfirmed - a species recorded but with "no tangible evidence" according to the SACC

== Rheas ==
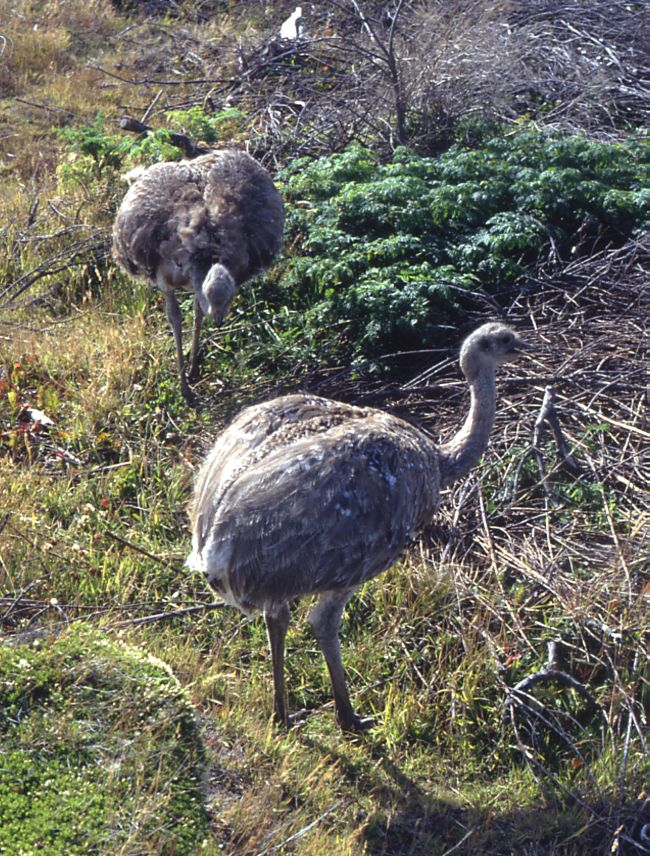
Lesser rheas, different races occur in Patagonia and in the northern Andes.

Order: Rheiformes Family: Rheidae

The rheas are large flightless birds native to South America. Their feet have three toes rather than four which allows them to run faster. One species has been recorded in Chile.

- Lesser rhea, Pterocnemia pennata

== Tinamous ==
Order: Tinamiformes Family: Tinamidae

The tinamous are one of the most ancient groups of birds. Although they look similar to other ground-dwelling birds like quail and grouse, they have no close relatives and are classified as a single family, Tinamidae, within their own order, the Tinamiformes. They are distantly related to the ratites (order Struthioniformes), that includes the rheas, emus, and kiwis. Six species have been recorded in Chile.

- Ornate tinamou, Nothoprocta ornata
- Chilean tinamou, Nothoprocta perdicaria (E)
- Andean tinamou, Nothoprocta pentlandii
- Elegant crested-tinamou, Eudromia elegans
- Puna tinamou, Tinamotis pentlandii
- Patagonian tinamou, Tinamotis ingoufi

== Screamers ==
Order: Anseriformes Family: Anhimidae The screamers are a small family of birds related to the ducks. They are large, bulky birds, with a small downy head, long legs, and large feet which are only partially webbed. They have large spurs on their wings which are used in fights over mates and in territorial disputes. One species has been recorded in Chile.

- Southern screamer, Chauna torquata (V)

== Ducks ==
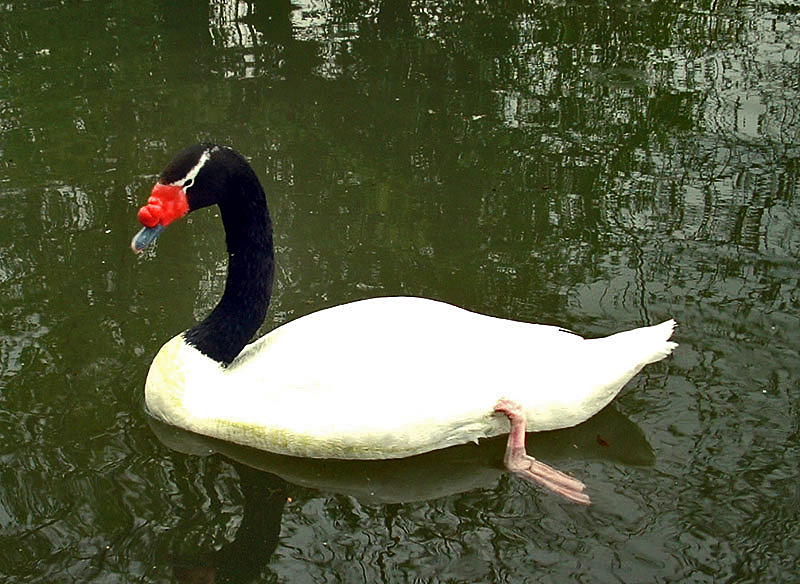
Black-necked swan, a large bird of coasts and wetlands.

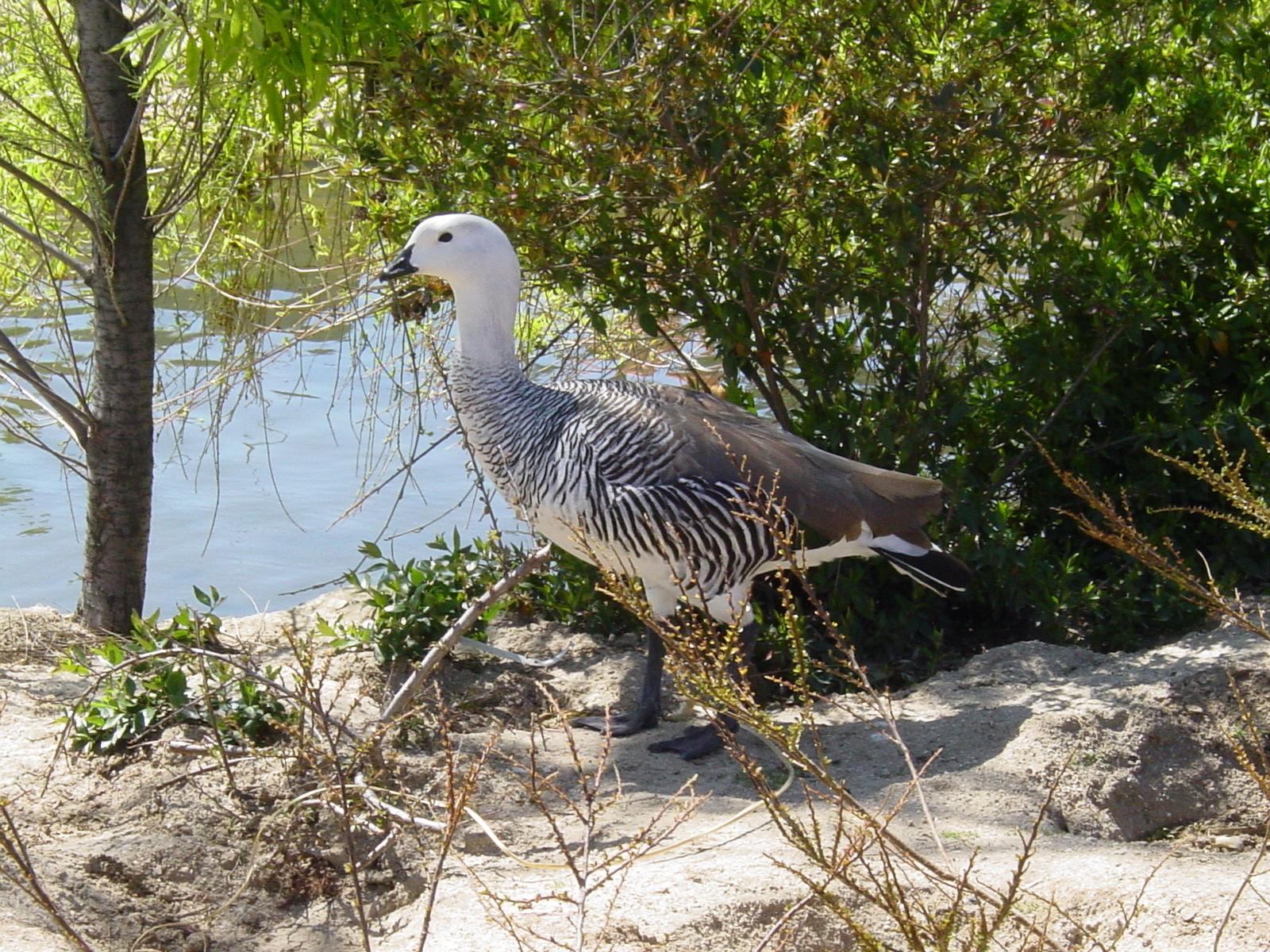
Upland goose, common in Patagonia

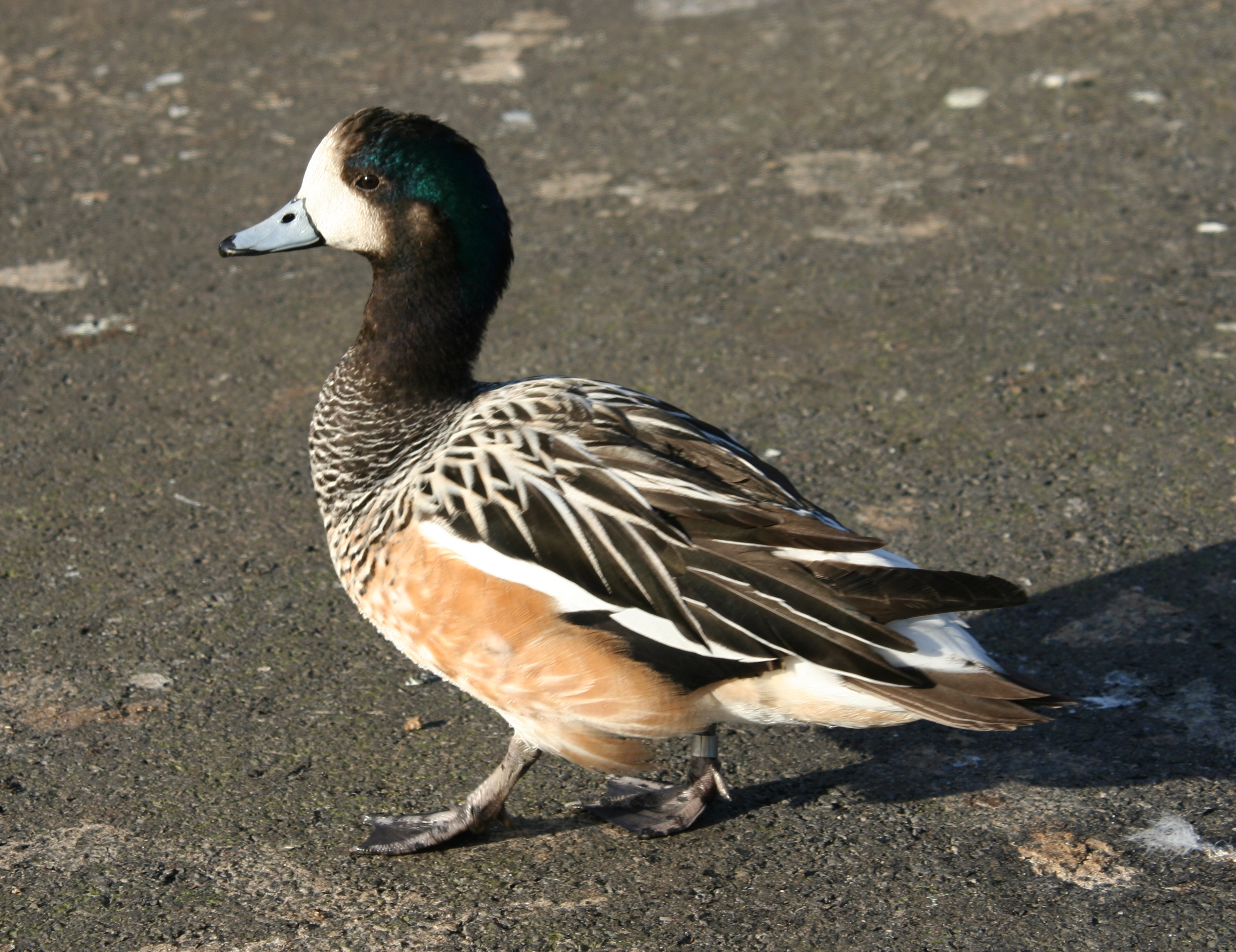
Chiloe wigeon, breeds in southern and central Chile with some migrating north in winter.

Order: Anseriformes Family: Anatidae

Anatidae includes the ducks and most duck-like waterfowl, such as geese and swans. These birds are adapted to an aquatic existence with webbed feet, flattened bills, and feathers that are excellent at shedding water due to an oily coating. Thirty species have been recorded in Chile.

- Fulvous whistling-duck, Dendrocygna bicolor (V)
- White-faced whistling-duck, Dendrocygna viduata (V)
- Black-bellied whistling-duck, Dendrocygna autumnalis (V)
- Black-necked swan, Cygnus melancoryphus
- Coscoroba swan, Coscoroba coscoroba
- Andean goose, Oressochen melanoptera
- Upland goose, Chloephaga picta
- Kelp goose, Chloephaga hybrida
- Ashy-headed goose, Chloephaga poliocephala
- Ruddy-headed goose, Chloephaga rubidiceps
- Comb duck, Sarkidiornis sylvicola (V)
- Torrent duck, Merganetta armata
- Flying steamer-duck, Tachyeres patachonicus
- Flightless steamer-duck, Tachyeres pteneres
- Crested duck, Lophonetta specularioides
- Spectacled duck, Speculanas specularis
- Puna teal, Spatula puna
- Silver teal, Spatula versicolor
- Red shoveler, Spatula platalea
- Northern shoveler, Spatula clypeata (V)
- Blue-winged teal, Spatula discors (V)
- Cinnamon teal, Spatula cyanoptera
- Chiloe wigeon, Mareca sibilatrix
- White-cheeked pintail, Anas bahamensis
- Yellow-billed pintail, Anas georgica
- Yellow-billed teal, Anas flavirostris
- Rosy-billed pochard, Netta peposaca
- Black-headed duck, Heteronetta atricapilla
- Ruddy duck, Oxyura jamaicensis (the local subspecies is also called Andean duck)
- Lake duck, Oxyura vittata

== New World quails ==
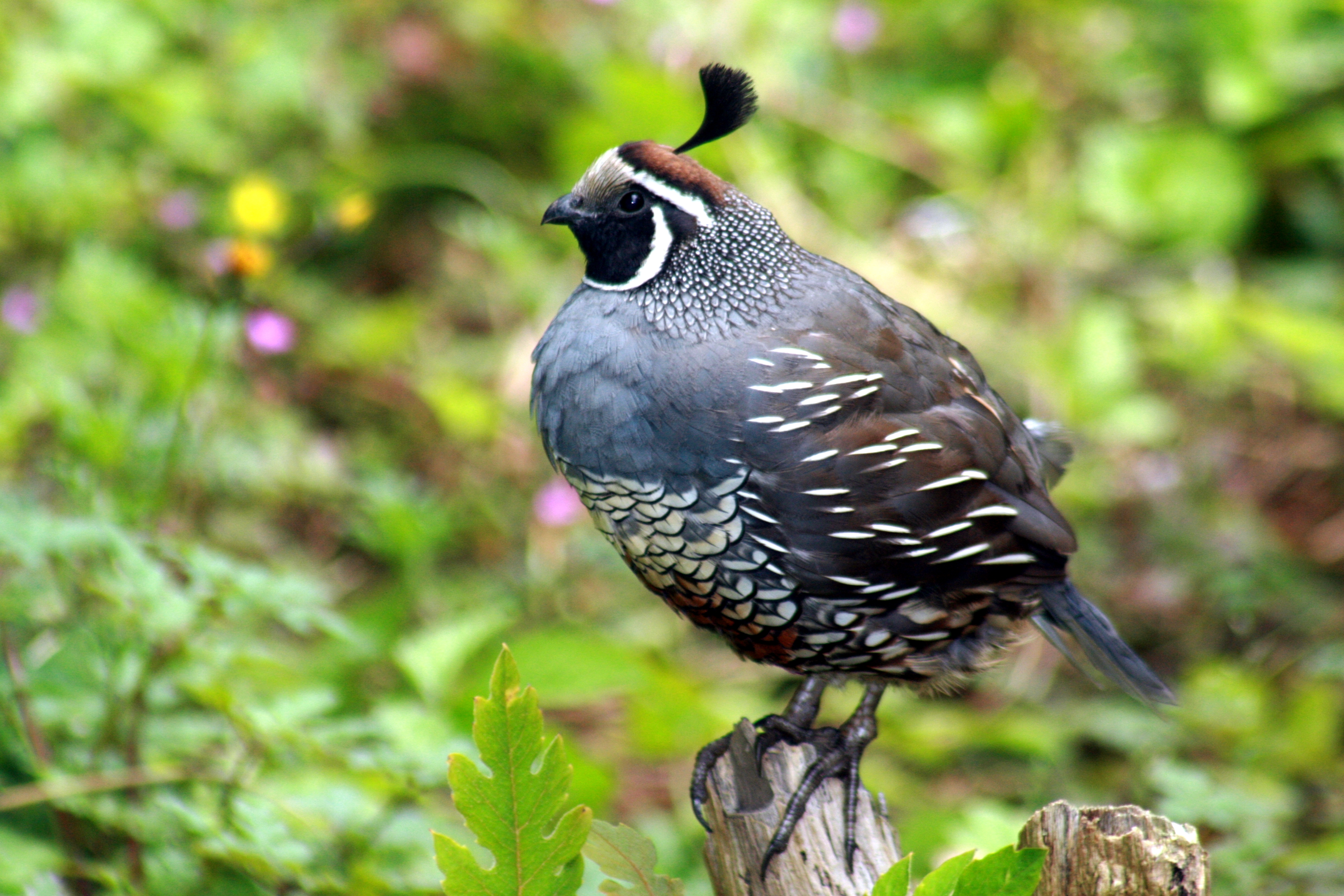
California quail, introduced in 1870.

Order: Galliformes Family: Odontophoridae

The New World quails are small, plump terrestrial birds only distantly related to the quails of the Old World, but named for their similar appearance and habits. One species has been recorded in Chile.

- California quail, Callipepla californica (I)

== Pheasants ==
Order: Galliformes Family: Phasianidae

The Phasianidae are a family of terrestrial birds which consists of quails, partridges, snowcocks, francolins, spurfowls, tragopans, monals, pheasants, peafowls and jungle fowls. In general, they are plump (although they vary in size) and have broad, relatively short wings. One species has been recorded in Chile.

- Ring-necked pheasant, Phasianus colchicus (I)

== Flamingos ==
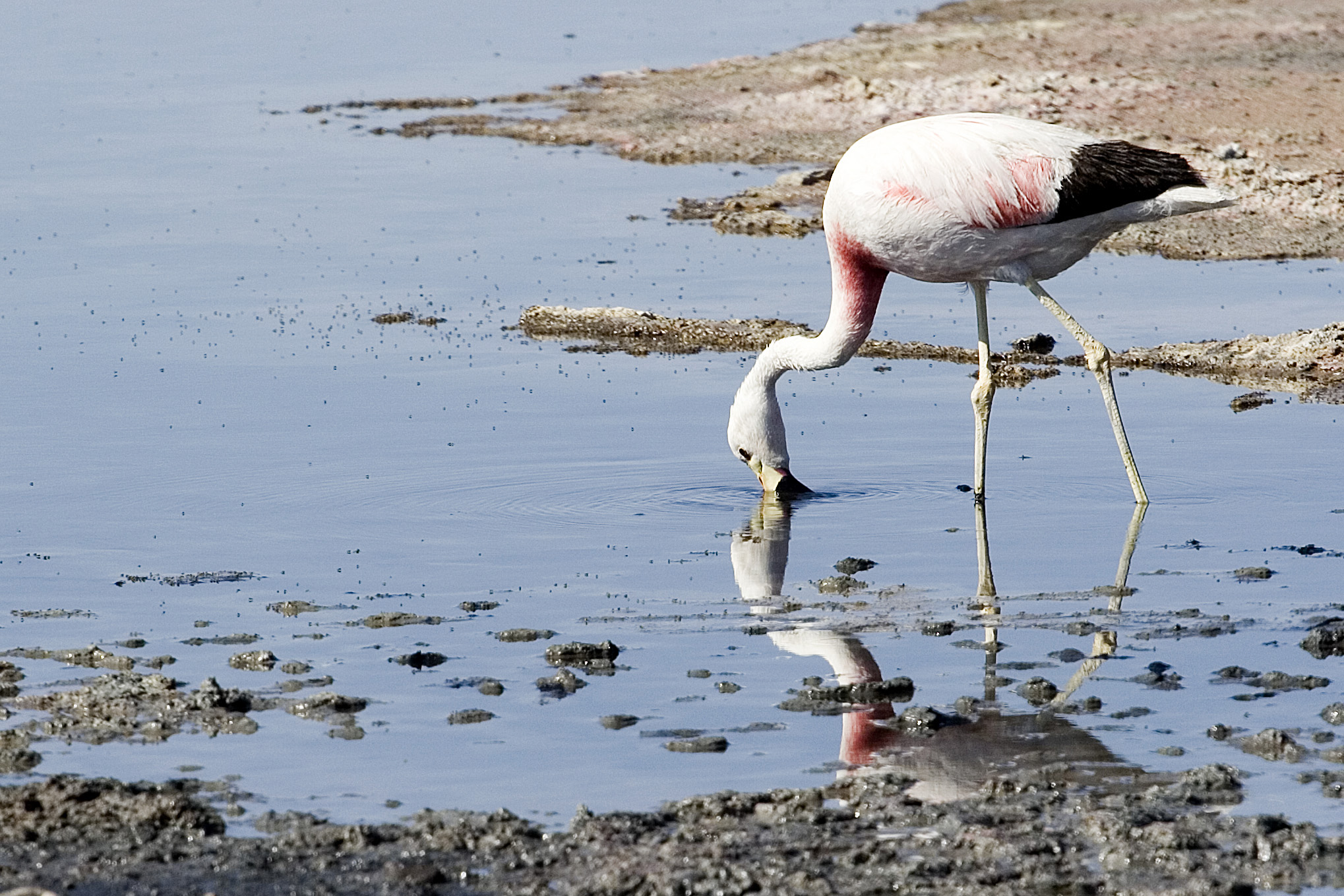
Andean flamingo in the Salar de Atacama, occurs at saline lakes in the northern highlands.

Order: Phoenicopteriformes Family: Phoenicopteridae

Flamingos are gregarious wading birds, usually 3 to 5 feet (0.9 to 1.5 m) tall, found in both the Western and Eastern Hemispheres. Flamingos filter-feed on shellfish and algae. Their oddly-shaped beaks are specially adapted to separate mud and silt from the food they consume and, uniquely, are used upside-down. Three species have been recorded in Chile.

- Chilean flamingo, Phoenicopterus chilensis
- Andean flamingo, Phoenicoparrus andinus
- James's flamingo (Puna flamingo), Phoenicoparrus jamesi

== Grebes ==
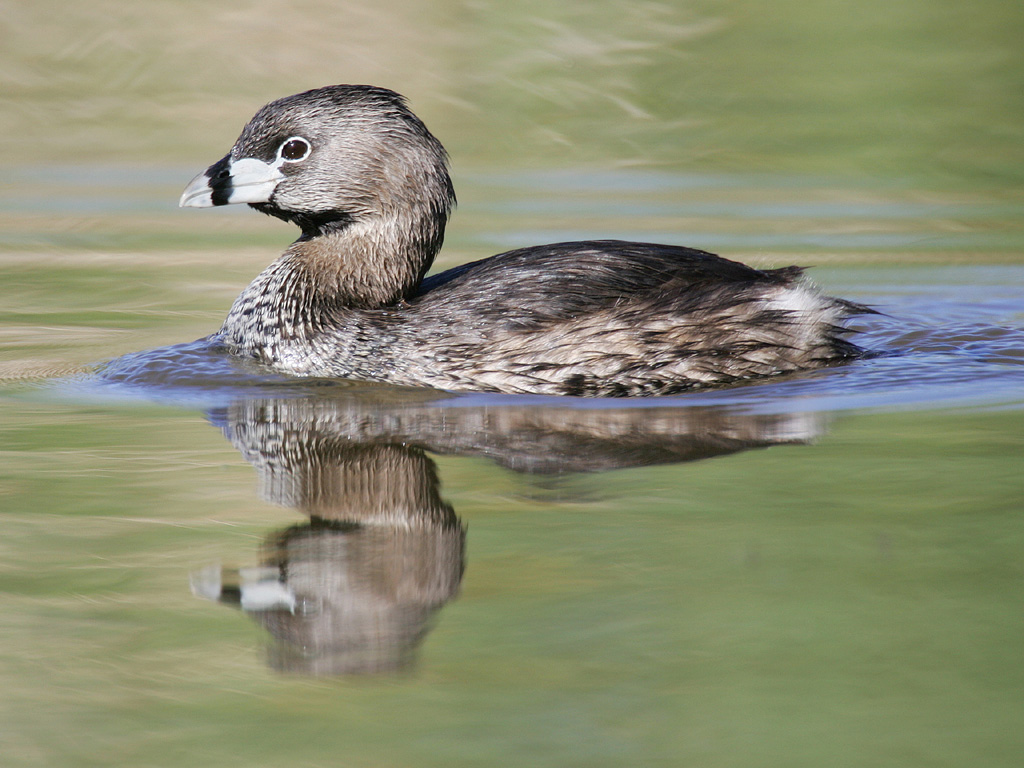
Pied-billed grebe, widespread on lakes and ponds.

Order: Podicipediformes Family: Podicipedidae

Grebes are small to medium-large freshwater diving birds. They have lobed toes and are excellent swimmers and divers. However, they have their feet placed far back on the body, making them quite ungainly on land. Five species have been recorded in Chile.

- White-tufted grebe, Rollandia rolland
- Pied-billed grebe, Podilymbus podiceps
- Great grebe, Podiceps major
- Silvery grebe, Podiceps occipitalis
- Hooded grebe, Podiceps gallardoi (V)

== Pigeons ==
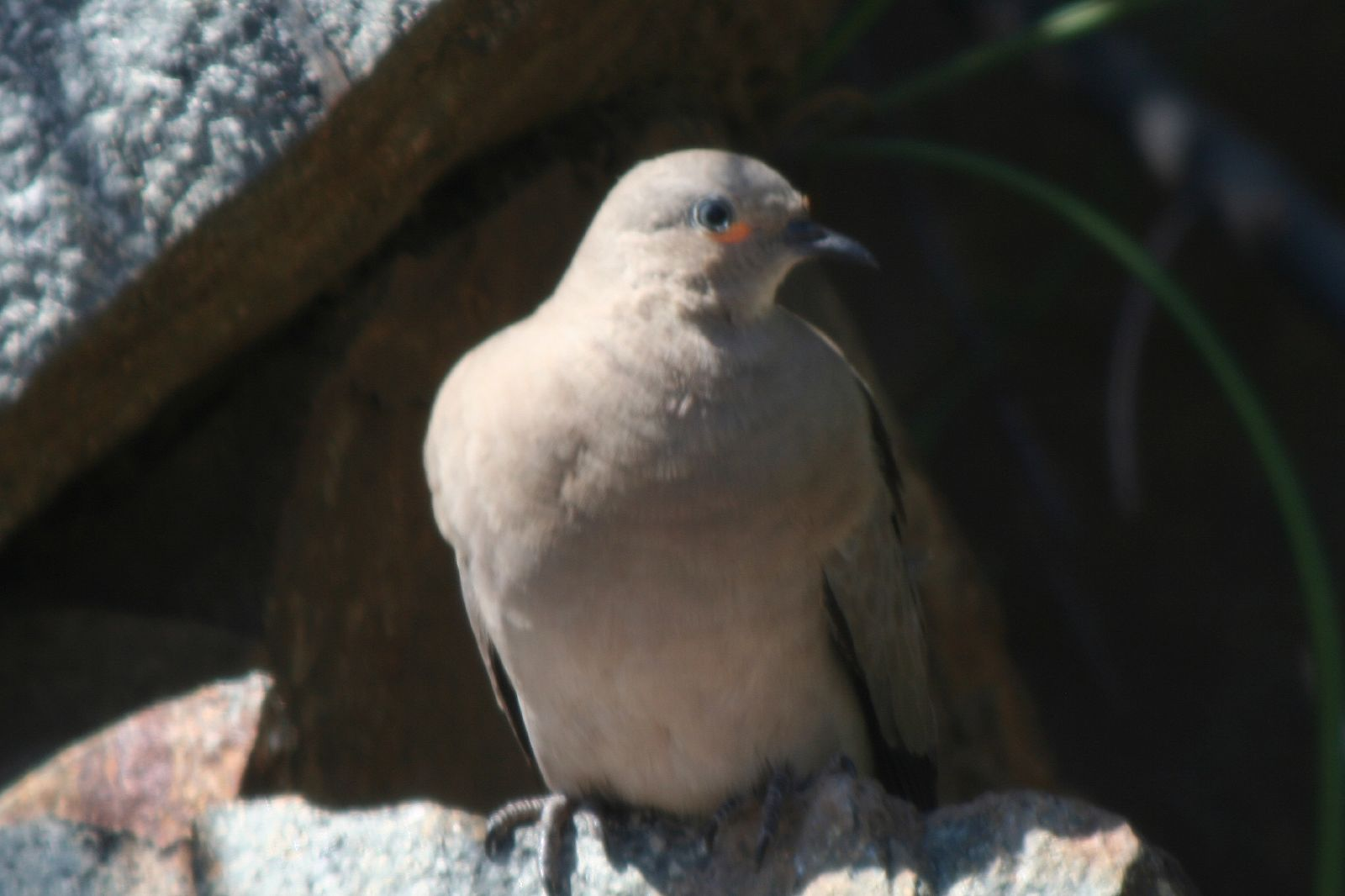
Black-winged ground dove, widespread in the Andes.

Order: Columbiformes Family: Columbidae

Pigeons and doves are stout-bodied birds with short necks and short slender bills with a fleshy cere. Twelve species have been recorded in Chile.

- Rock pigeon, Columba livia (I)
- Picazuro pigeon, Patagioenas picazuro (V)
- Spot-winged pigeon, Patagioenas maculosa
- Chilean pigeon, Patagioenas araucana
- West Peruvian dove, Zenaida meloda
- Eared dove, Zenaida auriculata
- Bare-faced ground dove, Metriopelia ceciliae
- Black-winged ground dove, Metriopelia melanoptera
- Golden-spotted ground dove, Metriopelia aymara
- Ruddy ground dove, Columbina talpacoti (V)
- Picui ground dove, Columbina picui
- Croaking ground dove, Columbina cruziana

== Cuckoos ==
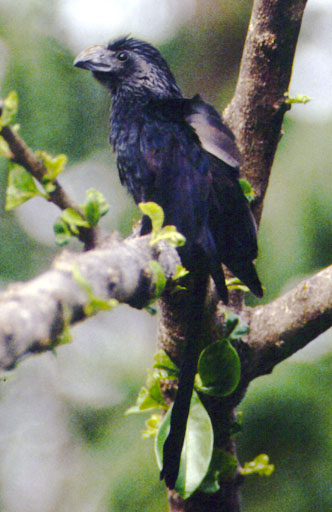
Groove-billed ani, occurs in farmland in the north of Chile.

Order: Cuculiformes Family: Cuculidae

The family Cuculidae includes cuckoos, roadrunners and anis. These birds are of variable size with slender bodies, long tails, and strong legs. Four species have been recorded in Chile.

- Smooth-billed ani, Crotophaga ani (V)
- Groove-billed ani, Crotophaga sulcirostris
- Dark-billed cuckoo, Coccyzus melacoryphus (V)
- Yellow-billed cuckoo, Coccyzus americanus (V)

== Oilbird ==
Order: Steatornithiformes Family: Steatornithidae

The oilbird is a slim, long-winged bird related to the nightjars. It is nocturnal and a specialist feeder on the fruit of the oil palm.

- Oilbird, Steatornis caripensis (V)

== Potoos ==
Order: Nyctibiiformes Family: Nyctibiidae

The potoos (sometimes called poor-me-ones) are large near passerine birds related to the nightjars and frogmouths. They are nocturnal insectivores that lack the bristles around the mouth found in the true nightjars. One species has been recorded in Chile.

- Common potoo, Nyctibius griseus (V)

== Nightjars ==
Order: Caprimulgiformes Family: Caprimulgidae

Nightjars are medium-sized nocturnal birds that usually nest on the ground. They have long wings, short legs and very short bills. Most have small feet, of little use for walking, and long pointed wings. Their soft plumage is camouflaged to resemble bark or leaves. Five species have been recorded in Chile.

- Nacunda nighthawk, Chordeiles nacunda (V)
- Lesser nighthawk, Chordeiles acutipennis (V)
- Common nighthawk, Chordeiles minor (V)
- Tschudi's nightjar, Quechuavis decussata
- Band-winged nightjar, Systellura longirostris

== Swifts ==
Order: Apodiformes Family: Apodidae

Swifts are small birds which spend the majority of their lives flying. These birds have very short legs and never settle voluntarily on the ground, perching instead only on vertical surfaces. Many swifts have long swept-back wings which resemble a crescent or boomerang. Three species have been recorded in Chile.

- White-collared swift, Streptoprocne zonaris
- Chimney swift, Chaetura pelagica
- Andean swift, Aeronautes andecolus

== Hummingbirds ==
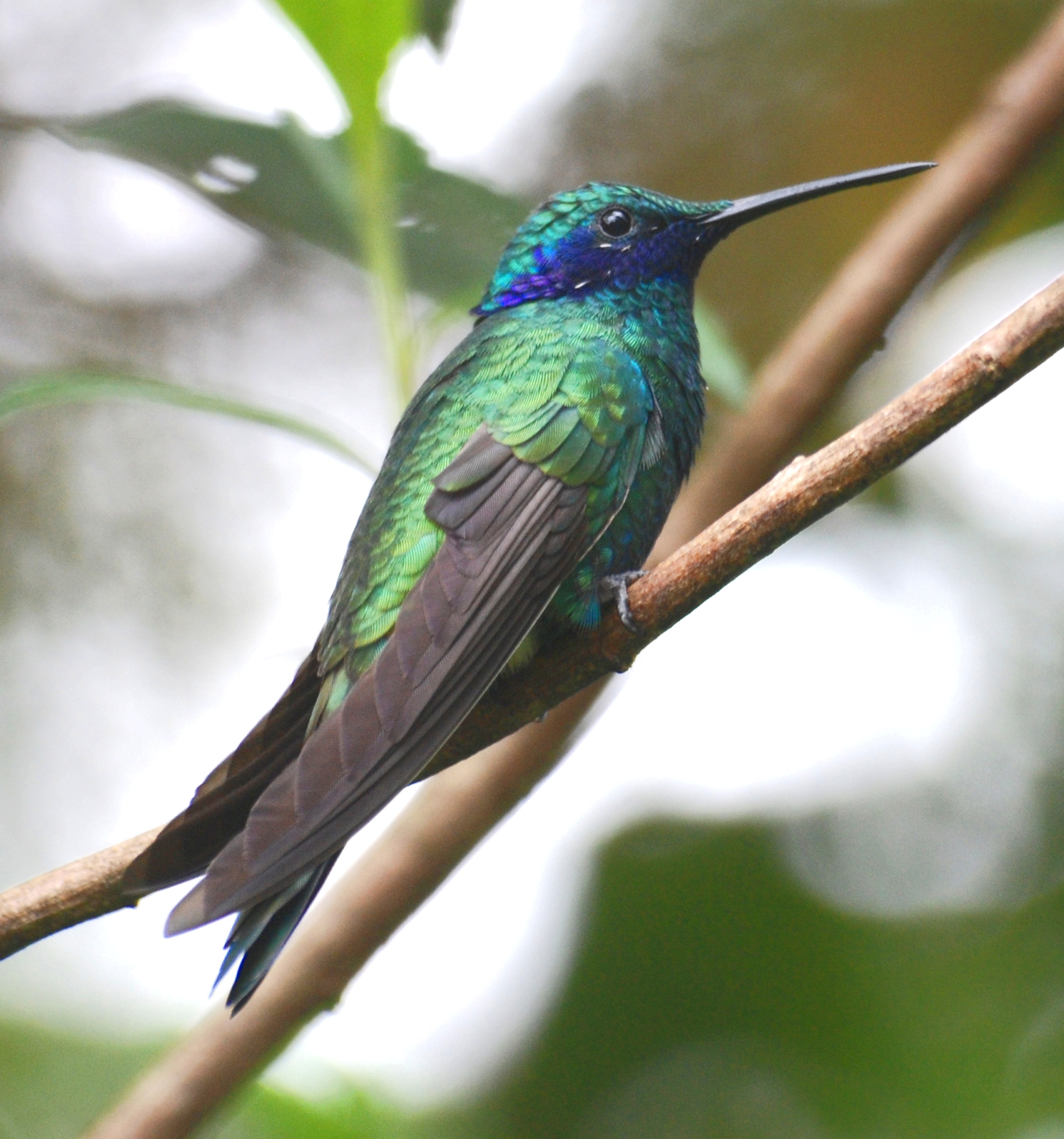
Sparkling violetear, a hummingbird that lives in the north of Chile.

Order: Apodiformes Family: Trochilidae

Hummingbirds are small birds capable of hovering in mid-air due to the rapid flapping of their wings. They are the only birds that can fly backward. Eleven species have been recorded in Chile.

- Sparkling violetear, Colibri coruscans
- Green-backed firecrown, Sephanoides sephaniodes
- Juan Fernandez firecrown, Sephanoides fernandensis (E)
- Andean hillstar, Oreotrochilus estella
- White-sided hillstar, Oreotrochilus leucopleurus
- Northern giant-hummingbird, Patagona peruviana
- Southern giant-hummingbird, Patagona gigas
- Chilean woodstar, Eulidia yarrellii (E)
- Oasis hummingbird, Rhodopis vesper
- Peruvian sheartail, Thaumastura cora
- Glittering-bellied emerald, Chlorostilbon lucidus (V)

== Limpkin ==
Order: Gruiformes Family: Aramidae

The limpkin is an odd bird that looks like a large rail, but is skeletally closer to the cranes. It is found in marshes with some trees or scrub as far north as southern Florida.

- Limpkin, Aramus guarauna (V)

== Rails ==
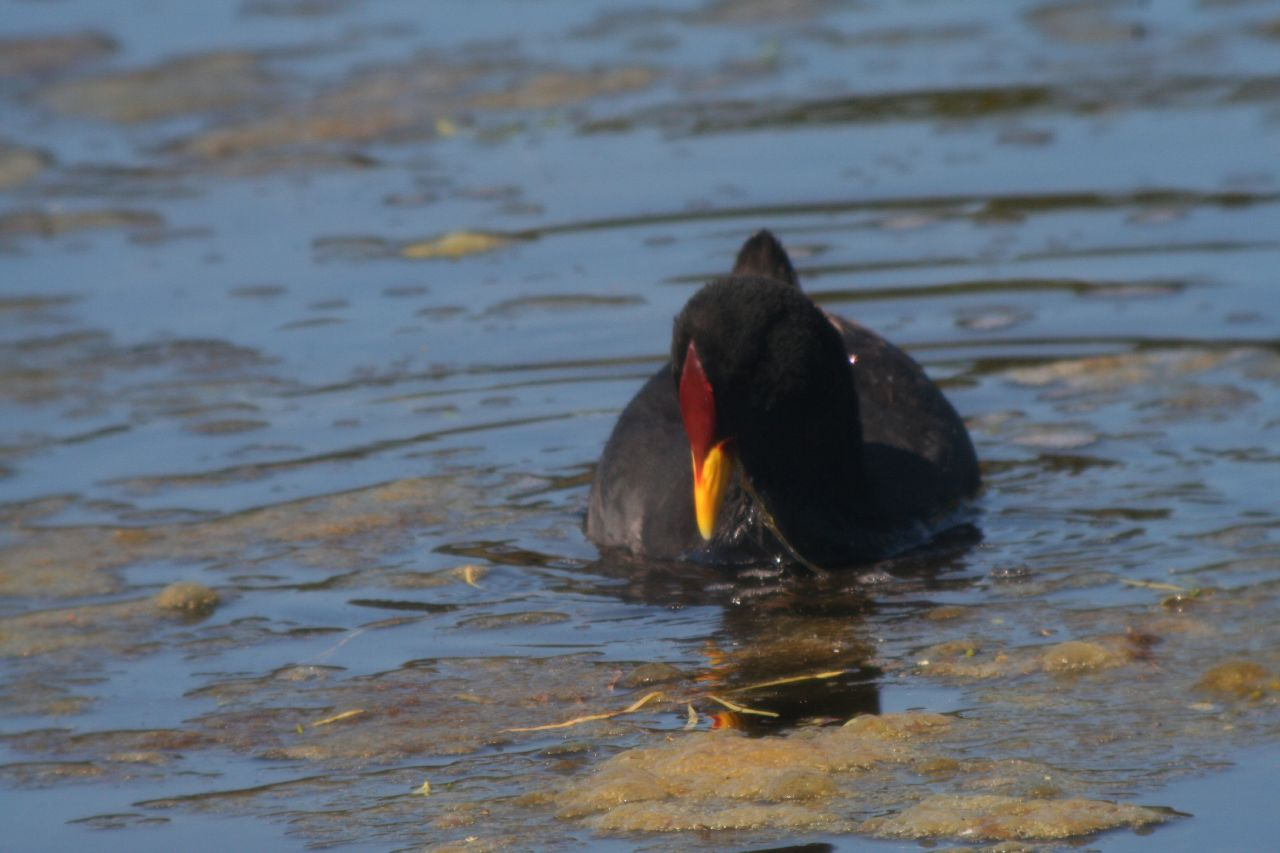
Red-fronted coot, found in well-vegetated lowland wetlands.

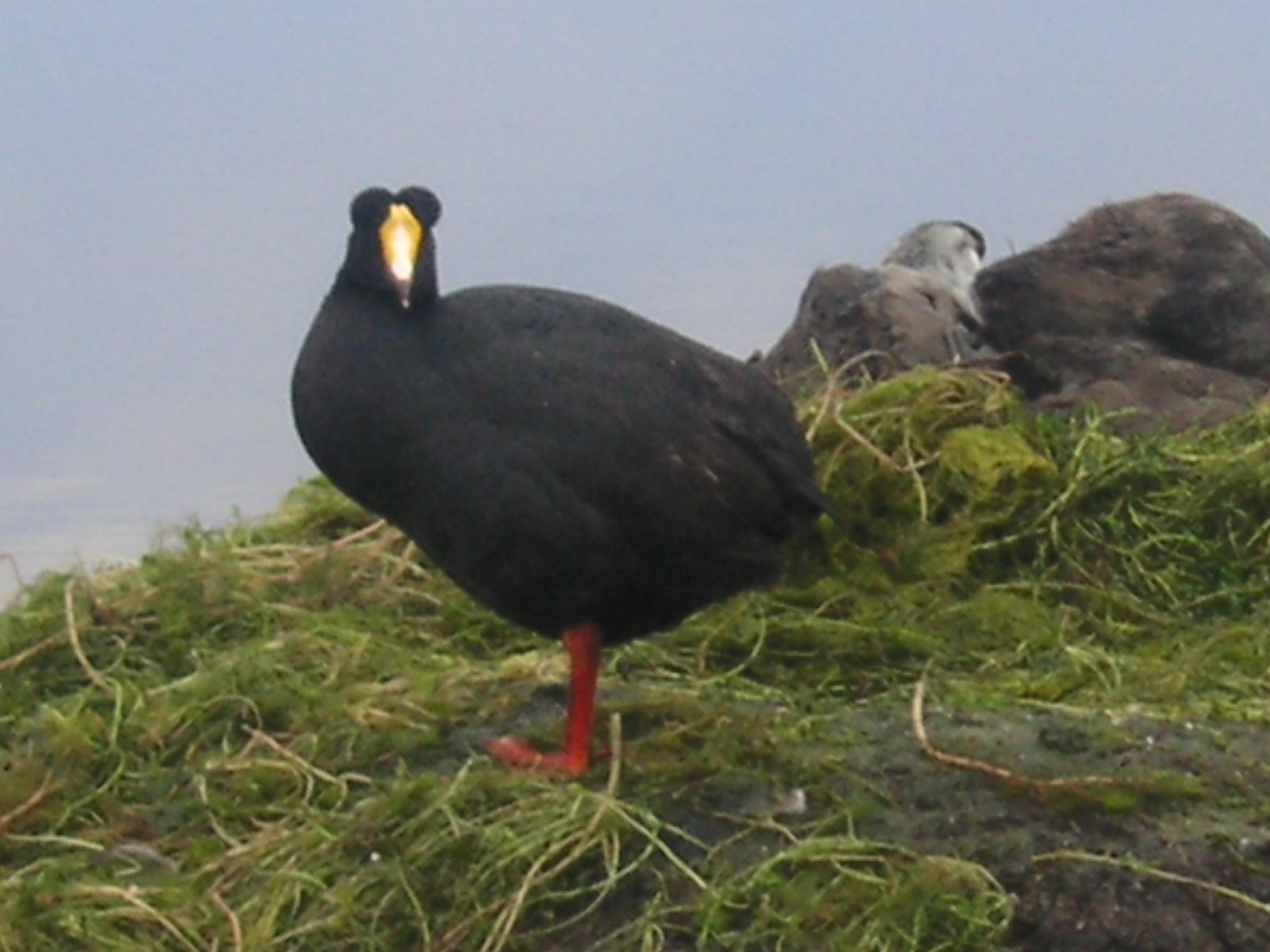
Giant coot at Bofedales de Parinacota, breeds at highland lakes in the north.

Order: Gruiformes Family: Rallidae

Rallidae is a large family of small to medium-sized birds which includes the rails, crakes, coots and gallinules. Typically they inhabit dense vegetation in damp environments near lakes, swamps, or rivers. In general, they are shy and secretive birds, making them difficult to observe. Most species have strong legs and long toes which are well adapted to soft uneven surfaces. They tend to have short, rounded wings and to be weak fliers. Fourteen species have been recorded in Chile.

- Austral rail, Rallus antarcticus
- Purple gallinule, Porphyrio martinica (V)
- Black rail, Laterallus jamaicensis
- Spotted rail, Pardirallus maculatus (V)
- Plumbeous rail, Pardirallus sanguinolentus
- Spot-flanked gallinule, Porphyriops melanops
- Dot-winged crake, Porzana spiloptera
- Common gallinule, Gallinula galeata
- Red-fronted coot, Fulica rufifrons
- Horned coot, Fulica cornuta
- Giant coot, Fulica gigantea
- Red-gartered coot, Fulica armillata
- Slate-colored coot, Fulica ardesiaca
- White-winged coot, Fulica leucoptera

== Plovers ==
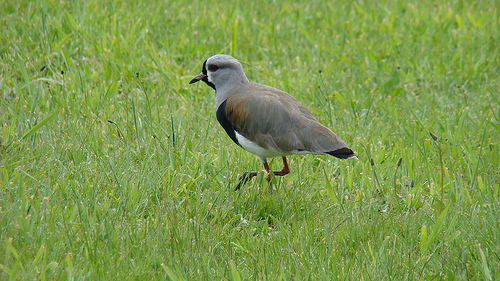
Southern lapwing, a conspicuous bird of open country.

Order: Charadriiformes Family: Charadriidae

The family Charadriidae includes the plovers, dotterels and lapwings. They are small to medium-sized birds with compact bodies, short, thick necks and long, usually pointed, wings. They are found in open country worldwide, mostly in habitats near water. Fourteen species have been recorded in Chile.

- Black-bellied plover, Pluvialis squatarola
- American golden-plover, Pluvialis dominica
- Tawny-throated dotterel, Oreopholus ruficollis
- Diademed sandpiper-plover, Phegornis mitchellii
- Rufous-chested dotterel, Zonibyx modestus
- Killdeer, Charadrius vociferus
- Semipalmated plover, Charadrius semipalmatus
- Southern lapwing, Vanellus chilensis
- Andean lapwing, Vanellus resplendens
- Wilson's plover, Anarynchus wilsonia (V)
- Collared plover, Anarynchus collaris
- Puna plover, Anarynchus alticola
- Two-banded plover, Anarynchus falklandicus
- Snowy plover, Anarynchus nivosus

== Oystercatchers ==
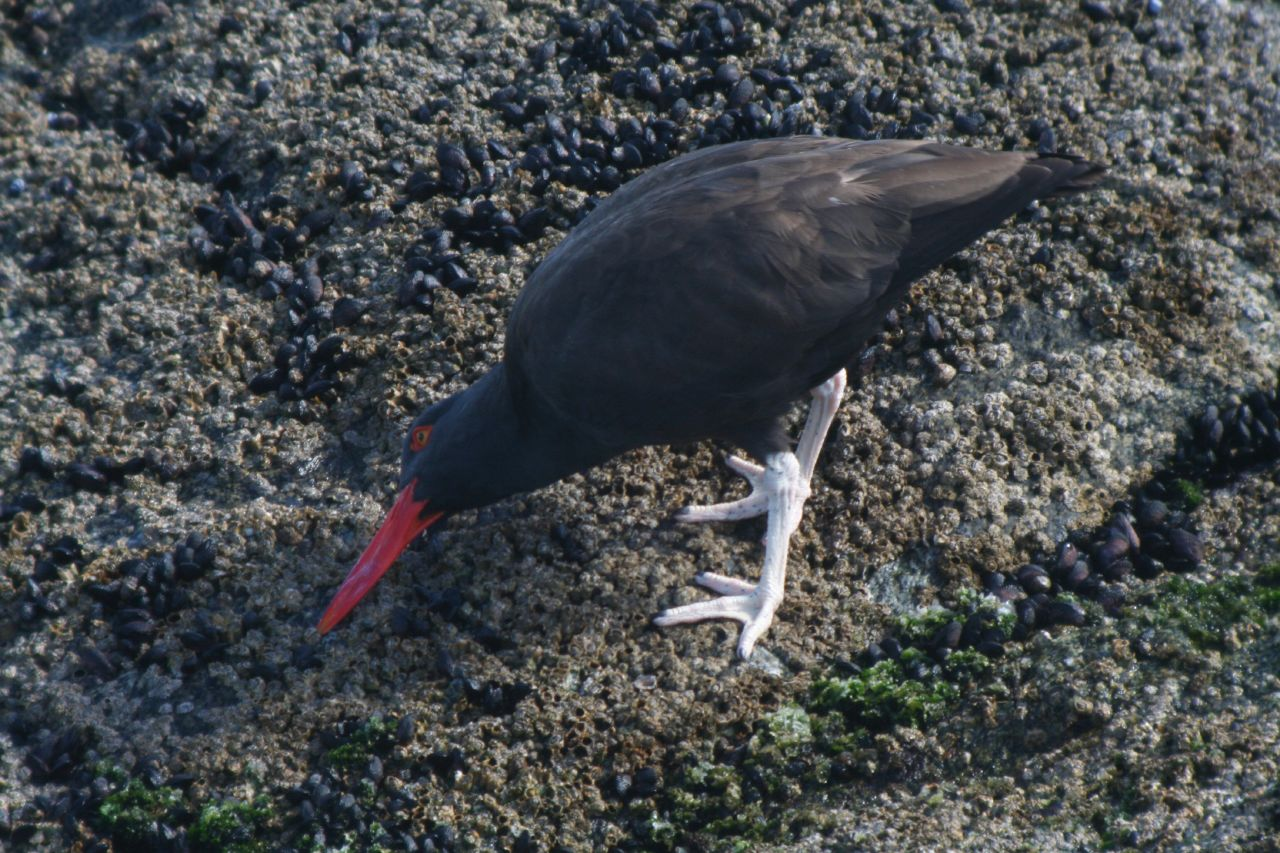
Blackish oystercatcher, restricted to rocky coasts.

Order: Charadriiformes Family: Haematopodidae

The oystercatchers are large and noisy plover-like birds, with strong bills used for smashing or prising open molluscs. Three species have been recorded in Chile.

- American oystercatcher, Haematopus palliatus
- Blackish oystercatcher, Haematopus ater
- Magellanic oystercatcher, Haematopus leucopodus

== Avocets and stilts ==
Order: Charadriiformes Family: Recurvirostridae

Recurvirostridae is a family of large wading birds, which includes the avocets and stilts. The avocets have long legs and long up-curved bills. The stilts have extremely long legs and long, thin, straight bills. Two species have been recorded in Chile.

- Black-necked stilt, Himantopus mexicanus
- Andean avocet, Recurvirostra andina

== Thick-knees ==
Order: Charadriiformes Family: Burhinidae

The thick-knees are a group of largely tropical waders in the family Burhinidae. They are found worldwide within the tropical zone, with some species also breeding in temperate Europe and Australia. They are medium to large waders with strong black or yellow-black bills, large yellow eyes and cryptic plumage. Despite being classed as waders, most species have a preference for arid or semi-arid habitats. One species has been recorded in Chile.

- Peruvian thick-knee, Hesperoburhinus superciliaris

== Sheathbills ==
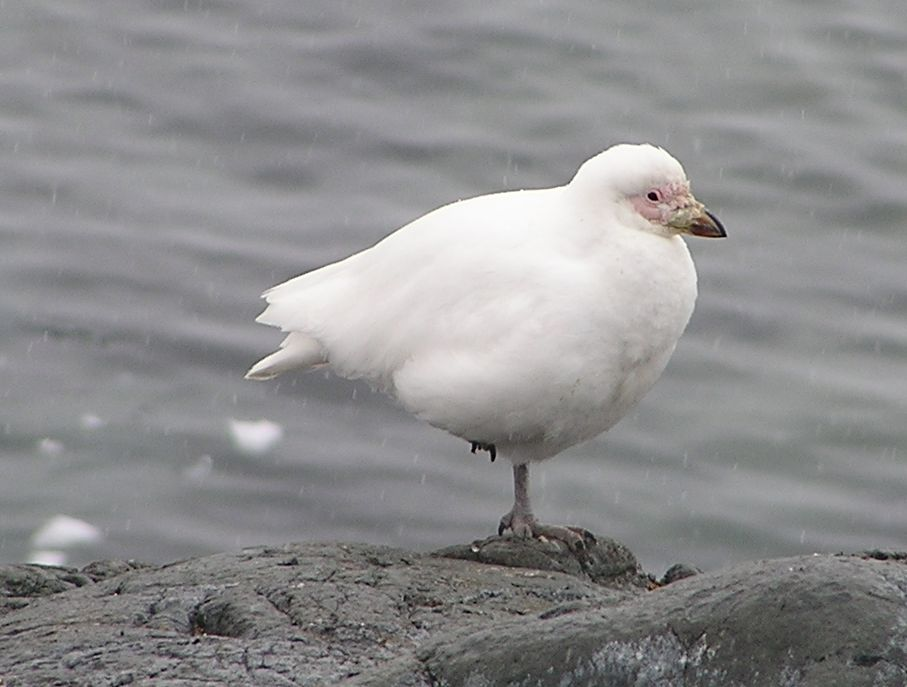
Snowy sheathbill, found along the coasts of southern chile.

Order: Charadriiformes Family: Chionidae

The sheathbills are scavengers of the Antarctic regions. They have white plumage and look plump and dove-like but are believed to be similar to the ancestors of the modern gulls and terns. One species has been recorded in Chile.

- Snowy sheathbill, Chionis alba

== Magellanic plover ==
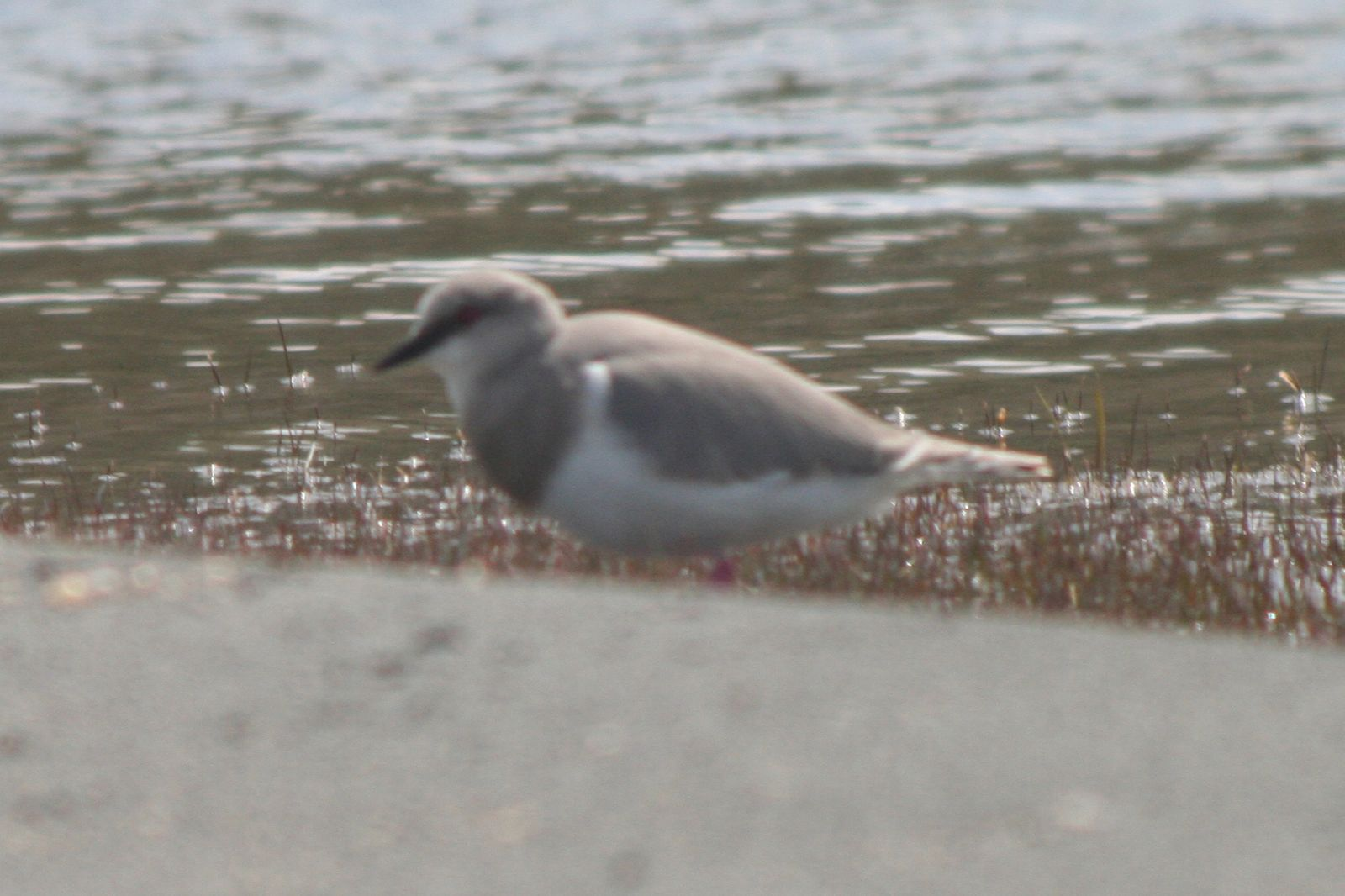
Magellanic plover, breeds by saline lakes in Patagonia.

Order: Charadriiformes Family: Pluvianellidae

The Magellanic plover is a rare wader found only in southernmost South America. In its build and habits it is similar to a turnstone. Its upperparts and breast are pale gray and the rest of the underparts are white. It has short red legs, a black bill and a red eye. In young birds, the eyes and legs are yellowish.

- Magellanic plover, Pluvianellus socialis

== Sandpipers ==
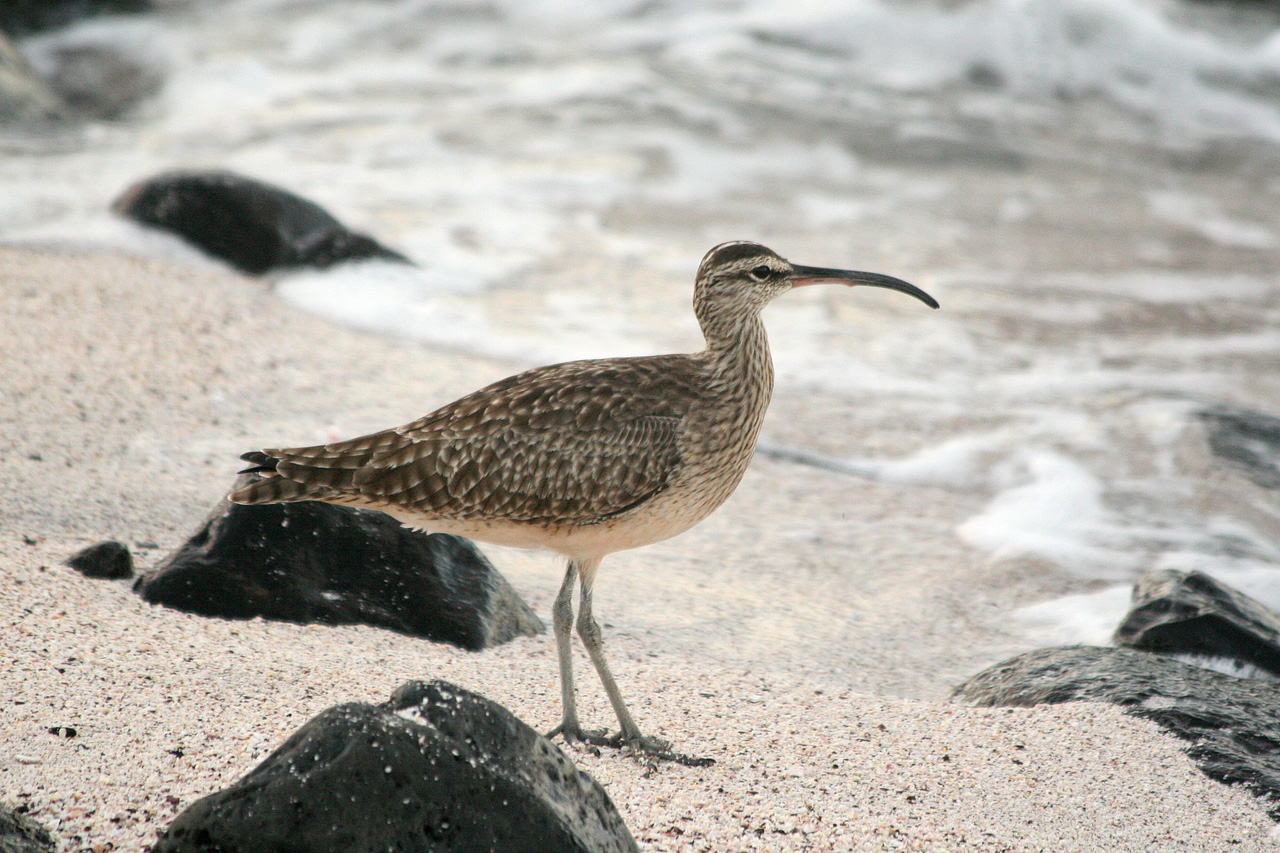
Whimbrel, a migrant from North America.

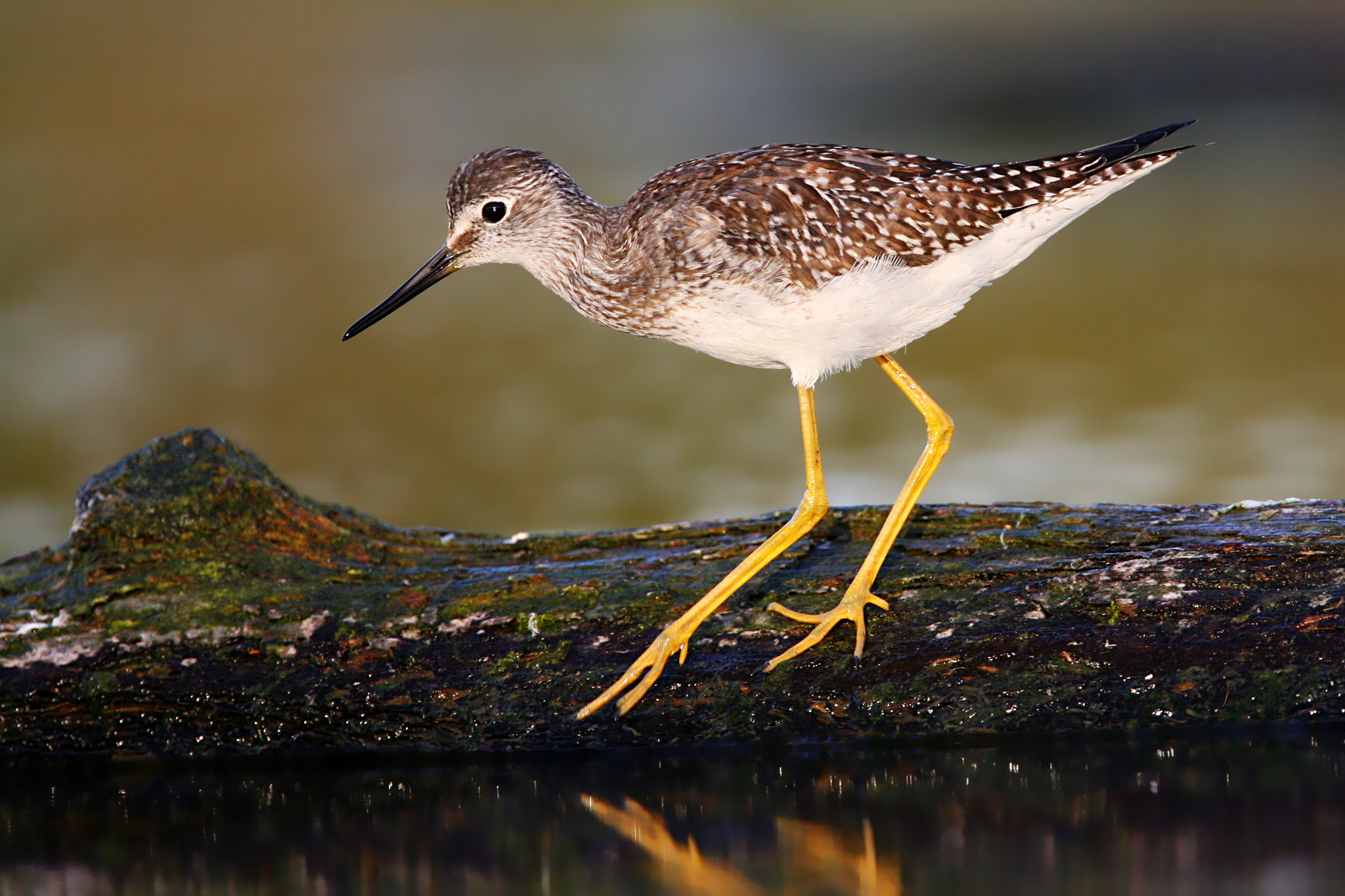
Lesser yellowlegs, a migrant to wetland areas.

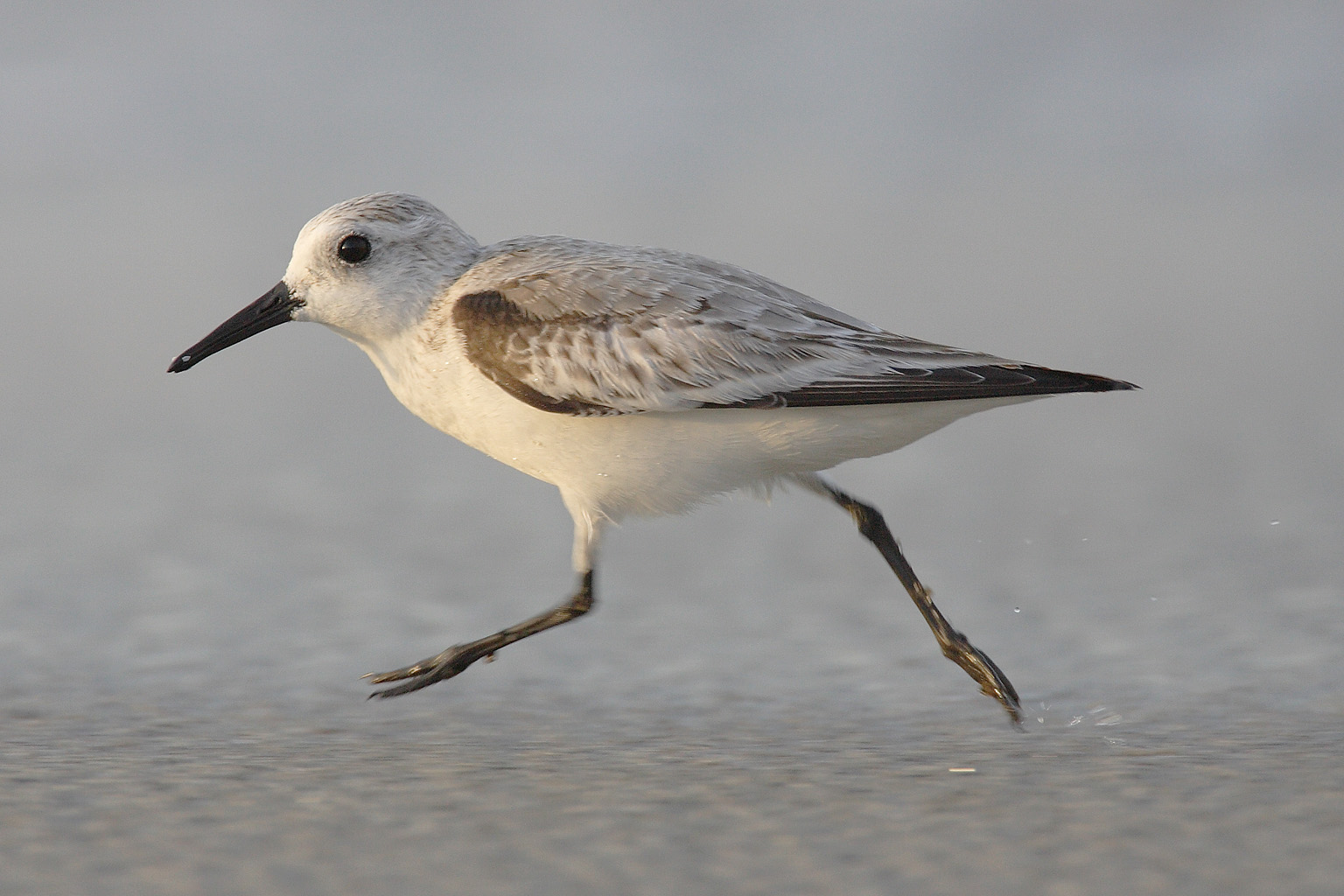
Sanderling, common on sandy beaches.

Order: Charadriiformes Family: Scolopacidae

Scolopacidae is a large diverse family of small to medium-sized shorebirds including the sandpipers, curlews, godwits, shanks, tattlers, woodcocks, snipes, dowitchers, and phalaropes. The majority of these species eat small invertebrates picked out of the mud or soil. Variation in length of legs and bills enables multiple species to feed in the same habitat, particularly on the coast, without direct competition for food. Thirty-two species have been recorded in Chile.

- Upland sandpiper, Bartramia longicauda
- Eskimo curlew, Numenius borealis (extinct)
- Whimbrel, Numenius phaeopus
- Bar-tailed godwit, Limosa lapponica (V)
- Hudsonian godwit, Limosa haemastica
- Marbled godwit, Limosa fedoa (V)
- Ruddy turnstone, Arenaria interpres
- Red knot, Calidris canutus
- Surfbird, Calidris virgata
- Stilt sandpiper, Calidris himantopus
- Curlew sandpiper, Calidris ferruginea (V)
- Sanderling, Calidris alba
- Baird's sandpiper, Calidris bairdii
- Least sandpiper, Calidris minutilla
- White-rumped sandpiper, Calidris fuscicollis
- Buff-breasted sandpiper, Calidris subruficollis (V)
- Pectoral sandpiper, Calidris melanotos
- Semipalmated sandpiper, Calidris pusilla
- Western sandpiper, Calidris mauri
- Short-billed dowitcher, Limnodromus griseus (V)
- Fuegian snipe, Gallinago stricklandii
- Magellanic snipe, Gallinago magellanica
- Puna snipe, Gallinago andina
- Wilson's phalarope, Phalaropus tricolor
- Red-necked phalarope, Phalaropus lobatus (V)
- Red phalarope, Phalaropus fulicarius
- Spotted sandpiper, Actitis macularius
- Solitary sandpiper, Tringa solitaria (V)
- Wandering tattler, Tringa incana (V)
- Greater yellowlegs, Tringa melanoleuca
- Willet, Tringa semipalmata
- Lesser yellowlegs, Tringa flavipes

== Seedsnipes ==
Order: Charadriiformes Family: Thinocoridae

The seedsnipes are a small family of birds that superficially resemble sparrows. They have short legs and long wings and are herbivorous waders. Four species have been recorded in Chile.

- Rufous-bellied seedsnipe, Attagis gayi
- White-bellied seedsnipe, Attagis malouinus
- Gray-breasted seedsnipe, Thinocorus orbignyianus
- Least seedsnipe, Thinocorus rumicivorus

== Jacanas ==
Order: Charadriiformes Family: Jacanidae

The jacanas are a family of waders found throughout the tropics. They are identifiable by their huge feet and claws which enable them to walk on floating vegetation in the shallow lakes that are their preferred habitat. One species has been recorded in Chile.

- Wattled jacana, Jacana jacana (V)

== Painted-snipes ==
Order: Charadriiformes Family: Rostratulidae

Painted-snipes are short-legged, long-billed birds similar in shape to the true snipes, but more brightly colored. One species has been recorded in Chile.

- South American painted-snipe, Nycticryphes semicollaris

== Skuas ==
Order: Charadriiformes Family: Stercorariidae

The family Stercorariidae are, in general, medium to large birds, typically with gray or brown plumage, often with white markings on the wings. They nest on the ground in temperate and arctic regions and are long-distance migrants. Six species have been recorded in Chile.

- Chilean skua, Stercorarius chilensis
- South polar skua, Stercorarius maccormicki
- Brown skua, Stercorarius antarctica (V)
- Pomarine jaeger, Stercorarius pomarinus
- Parasitic jaeger, Stercorarius parasiticus
- Long-tailed jaeger, Stercorarius longicaudus

== Gulls ==
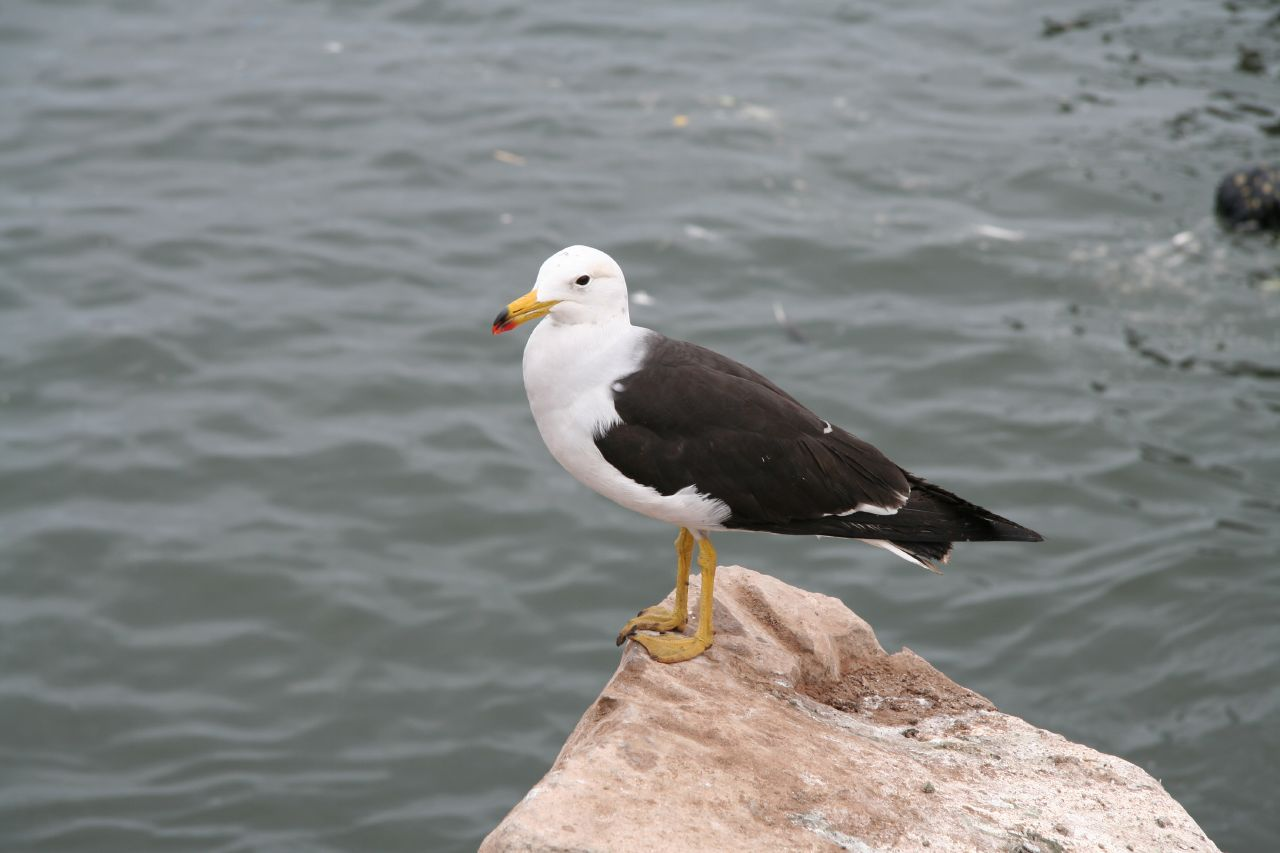
Belcher's gull, common on northern coasts.

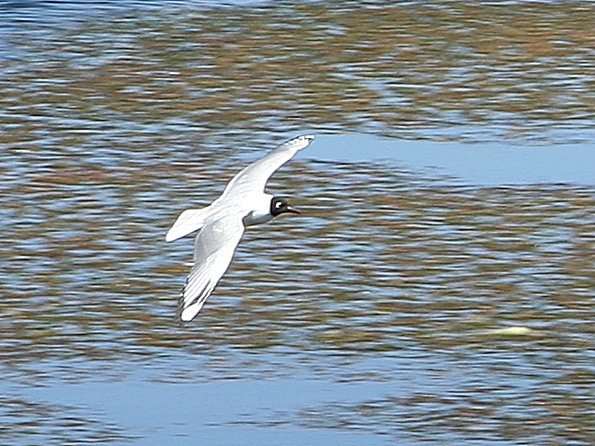
Andean gull, breeds at high-altitude wetlands.

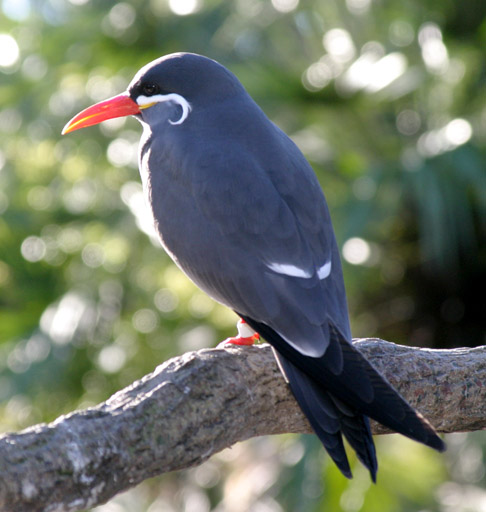
Inca tern, common in the waters of the Humboldt Current.

Order: Charadriiformes Family: Laridae

Laridae is a family of medium to large seabirds and includes gulls, kittiwakes, and terns. Gulls are typically gray or white, often with black markings on the head or wings. They have longish bills and webbed feet. Terns are a group of generally medium to large seabirds typically with gray or white plumage, often with black markings on the head. Most terns hunt fish by diving but some pick insects off the surface of fresh water. Terns are generally long-lived birds, with several species known to live in excess of 30 years. Thirty-three species of Laridae have been recorded in Chile.

- Brown noddy, Anous stolidus
- Black noddy, Anous minutus
- Gray noddy, Anous albivitta
- Black skimmer, Rynchops niger
- Swallow-tailed gull, Creagrus furcatus
- Sabine's gull, Xema sabini
- Bonaparte's gull, Chroicocephalus philadelphia (V)
- Andean gull, Chroicocephalus serranus
- Brown-hooded gull, Chroicocephalus maculipennis
- Gray-hooded gull, Chroicocephalus cirrocephalus
- Dolphin gull, Leucophaeus scoresbii
- Gray gull, Leucophaeus modestus
- Laughing gull, Leucophaeus atricilla (V)
- Franklin's gull, Leucophaeus pipixcan
- Belcher's gull, Larus belcheri
- Kelp gull, Larus dominicanus
- Herring gull, Larus argentatus (V)
- Sooty tern, Onychoprion fuscatus
- Bridled tern, Onychoprion anaethetus (V)
- Least tern, Sternula antillarum (V)
- Peruvian tern, Sternula lorata
- Large-billed tern, Phaetusa simplex (U)
- Gull-billed tern, Gelochelidon nilotica (V)
- Inca tern, Larosterna inca
- Black tern, Chlidonias niger (V)
- Common tern, Sterna hirundo
- Arctic tern, Sterna paradisaea
- South American tern, Sterna hirundinacea
- Antarctic tern, Sterna vittata (U)
- Snowy-crowned tern, Sterna trudeaui
- Elegant tern, Thalasseus elegans
- Sandwich tern, Thalasseus sandvicensis
- Royal tern, Thalasseus maximus (V)

== Tropicbirds ==
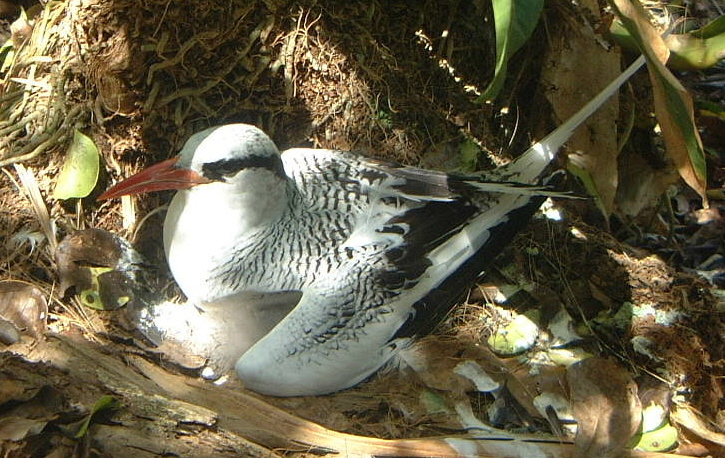
Red-billed tropicbird, a small colony breeds on Chañaral Island.

Order: Phaethontiformes Family: Phaethontidae

Tropicbirds are slender white birds of tropical oceans, with exceptionally long central tail feathers. Their heads and long wings have black markings. Three species have been recorded in Chile.

- Red-billed tropicbird, Phaethon aethereus
- Red-tailed tropicbird, Phaethon rubricauda
- White-tailed tropicbird, Phaethon lepturus

== Penguins ==
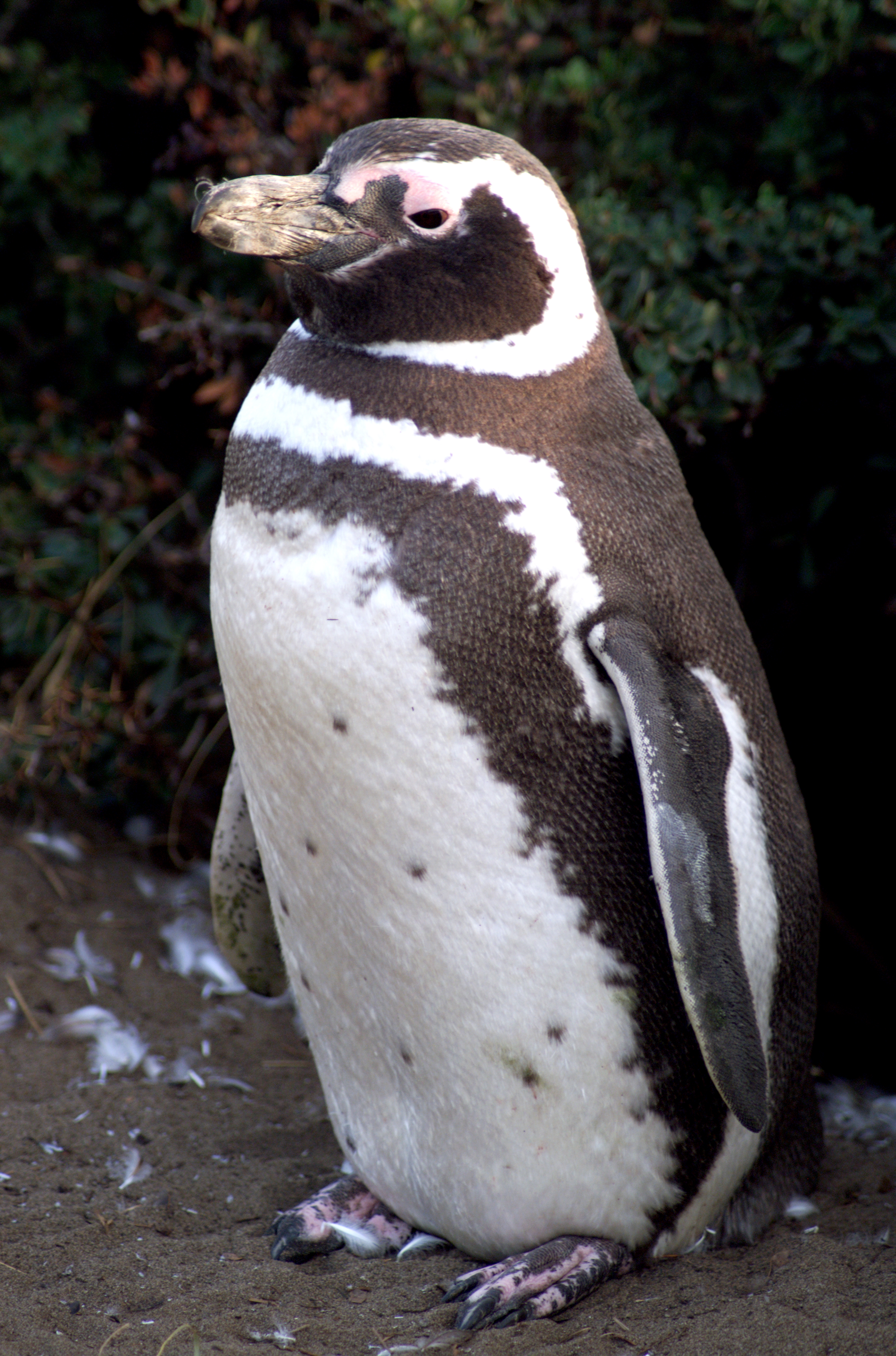
Magellanic penguin, breeds in colonies in the south.

Order: Sphenisciformes Family: Spheniscidae

The penguins are a group of aquatic, flightless birds living almost exclusively in the Southern Hemisphere. Most penguins feed on krill, fish, squid and other forms of sealife caught while swimming underwater. Nine species have been recorded in Chile.

- King penguin, Aptenodytes patagonicus
- Emperor penguin, Aptenodytes forsteri (V)
- Gentoo penguin, Pygoscelis papua
- Chinstrap penguin, Pygoscelis antarctica (V)
- Little penguin, Eudyptula minor (V)
- Humboldt penguin, Spheniscus humboldti
- Magellanic penguin, Spheniscus magellanicus
- Macaroni penguin, Eudyptes chrysolophus
- Rockhopper penguin, Eudyptes chrysocome

== Albatrosses ==
Order: Procellariiformes Family: Diomedeidae

The albatrosses are among the largest of flying birds, and the great albatrosses from the genus Diomedea have the largest wingspans of any extant birds. Eleven species have been recorded in Chile.

- Waved albatross, Phoebastria irrorata (V)
- Royal albatross, Diomedea epomophora
- Wandering albatross, Diomedea exulans
- Sooty albatross, Phoebetria fusca (V)
- Light-mantled albatross, Phoebetria palpebrata
- Black-browed albatross, Thalassarche melanophris
- Gray-headed albatross, Thalassarche chrysostoma
- Buller's albatross, Thalassarche bulleri
- White-capped albatross (also called shy albatross), Thalassarche cauta (V)
- Salvin's albatross, Thalassarche salvini
- Chatham albatross, Thalassarche eremita

== Southern storm-petrels ==
Order: Procellariiformes Family: Oceanitidae

The storm-petrels are the smallest seabirds, relatives of the petrels, feeding on planktonic crustaceans and small fish picked from the surface, typically while hovering. The flight is fluttering and sometimes bat-like. Until 2018, this family's species were included with the other storm-petrels in family Hydrobatidae. Seven species have been recorded in Chile.

- White-bellied storm-petrel, Fregetta grallaria
- Black-bellied storm-petrel, Fregetta tropica (V)
- Wilson's storm-petrel, Oceanites oceanicus
- Pincoya storm-petrel, Oceanites pincoyae
- Elliot's storm-petrel, Oceanites gracilis
- Gray-backed storm-petrel, Garrodia nereis (V)
- White-faced storm-petrel, Pelagodroma marina

== Northern storm-petrels ==
Order: Procellariiformes Family: Hydrobatidae

Though the members of this family are similar in many respects to the southern storm-petrels, including their general appearance and habits, there are enough genetic differences to warrant their placement in a separate family. Three species have been recorded in Chile.

- Wedge-rumped storm-petrel, Hydrobates tethys
- Markham's storm-petrel, Hydrobates markhami
- Hornby's storm-petrel, Hydrobates hornbyi

== Shearwaters ==
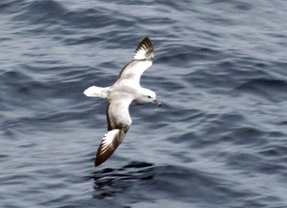
Southern fulmar, common offshore especially in winter.

Order: Procellariiformes Family: Procellariidae

The procellariids are the main group of medium-sized "true petrels", characterized by united nostrils with medium septum and a long outer functional primary. Thirty-seven species have been recorded in Chile.

- Southern giant-petrel, Macronectes giganteus
- Northern giant-petrel, Macronectes halli
- Northern fulmar, Fulmarus glacialis (V)
- Southern fulmar, Fulmarus glacialoides
- Antarctic petrel, Thalassoica antarctica (V)
- Pintado petrel, Daption capense
- Kerguelen petrel, Aphrodroma brevirostris (V)
- Gould's petrel, Pterodroma leucoptera (V)
- Great-winged petrel, Pterodroma macroptera (V)
- Soft-plumaged petrel, Pterodroma mollis (V)
- White-headed petrel, Pterodroma lessonii (U)
- Cook's petrel, Pterodroma cookii (V)
- Black-winged petrel, Pterodroma nigripennis (V)
- Masatierra petrel, Pterodroma defilippiana
- Stejneger's petrel, Pterodroma longirostris
- Murphy's petrel, Pterodroma ultima (V)
- Kermadec petrel, Pterodroma neglecta
- Mottled petrel, Pterodroma inexpectata (U)
- Juan Fernández petrel, Pterodroma externa
- Blue petrel, Halobaena caerulea
- Broad-billed prion, Pachyptila vittata (V)
- Antarctic prion, Pachyptila desolata
- Slender-billed prion, Pachyptila belcheri
- Gray petrel, Procellaria cinerea (V)
- White-chinned petrel, Procellaria aequinoctialis
- Parkinson's petrel, Procellaria parkinsoni
- Westland petrel, Procellaria westlandica
- Buller's shearwater, Ardenna bulleri
- Sooty shearwater, Ardenna griseus
- Great shearwater, Ardenna gravis
- Pink-footed shearwater, Ardenna creatopus
- Flesh-footed shearwater, Ardenna carneipes (V)
- Manx shearwater, Puffinus puffinus
- Little shearwater, Puffinus elegans
- Peruvian diving-petrel, Pelecanoides garnotii
- Common diving-petrel, Pelecanoides urinatrix
- Magellanic diving-petrel, Pelecanoides magellani

== Storks ==
Order: Ciconiiformes Family: Ciconiidae

Storks are large, long-legged, long-necked, wading birds with long, stout bills. Storks are mute, but bill-clattering is an important mode of communication at the nest. Their nests can be large and may be reused for many years. Many species are migratory. Two species have been recorded in Chile.

- Maguari stork, Ciconia maguari (V)
- Wood stork, Mycteria americana (V)

== Frigatebirds ==
Order: Suliformes Family: Fregatidae

Frigatebirds are large seabirds usually found over tropical oceans. They are large, black-and-white or completely black, with long wings and deeply forked tails. The males have colored inflatable throat pouches. They do not swim or walk and cannot take off from a flat surface. Having the largest wingspan-to-body-weight ratio of any bird, they are essentially aerial, able to stay aloft for more than a week. Two species have been recorded in Chile.

- Magnificent frigatebird, Fregata magnificens (V)
- Great frigatebird, Fregata minor

== Boobies ==
Order: Suliformes Family: Sulidae

The sulids comprise the gannets and boobies. Both groups are medium to large coastal seabirds that plunge-dive for fish. Six species have been recorded in Chile.

- Blue-footed booby, Sula nebouxii
- Peruvian booby, Sula variegata
- Masked booby, Sula dactylatra
- Nazca booby, Sula granti (V)
- Red-footed booby, Sula sula (V)
- Brewster's booby, Sula brewsteri (V)

== Cormorants ==
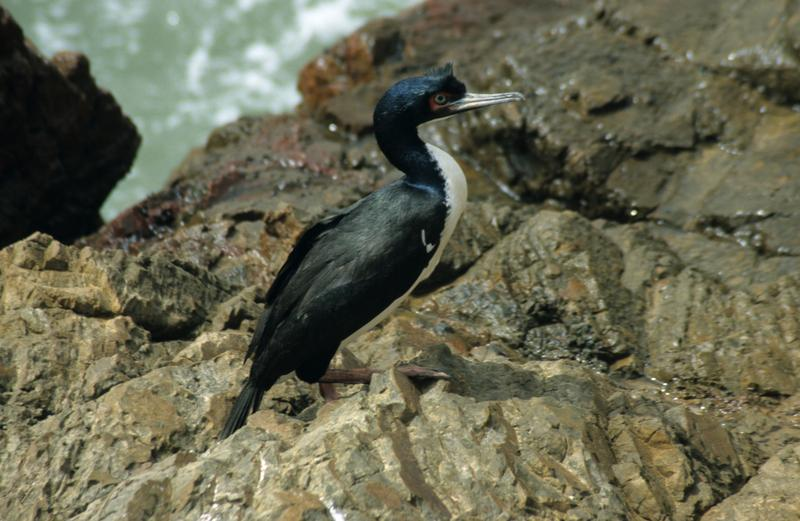
Guanay cormorant nests on islands in large colonies.

Order: Suliformes Family: Phalacrocoracidae

Phalacrocoracidae is a family of medium to large coastal, fish-eating seabirds that includes cormorants and shags. Plumage coloration varies, with the majority having mainly dark plumage, some species being black-and-white and a few being colorful. Five species have been recorded in Chile.

- Red-legged cormorant, Phalacrocorax gaimardi
- Neotropic cormorant, Phalacrocorax brasilianus
- Magellanic cormorant, Phalacrocorax magellanicus
- Guanay cormorant, Phalacrocorax bougainvillii
- Imperial cormorant (shag), Phalacrocorax atriceps

== Pelicans ==
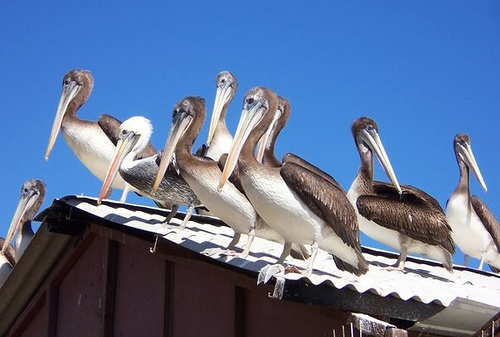
Peruvian pelicans, common in the Humboldt Current area.

Order: Pelecaniformes Family: Pelecanidae

Pelicans are large water birds with a distinctive pouch under their beak. As with other members of the order Pelecaniformes, they have webbed feet with four toes. Two species have been recorded in Chile.

- Brown pelican, Pelecanus occidentalis (V)
- Peruvian pelican, Pelecanus thagus

== Herons ==
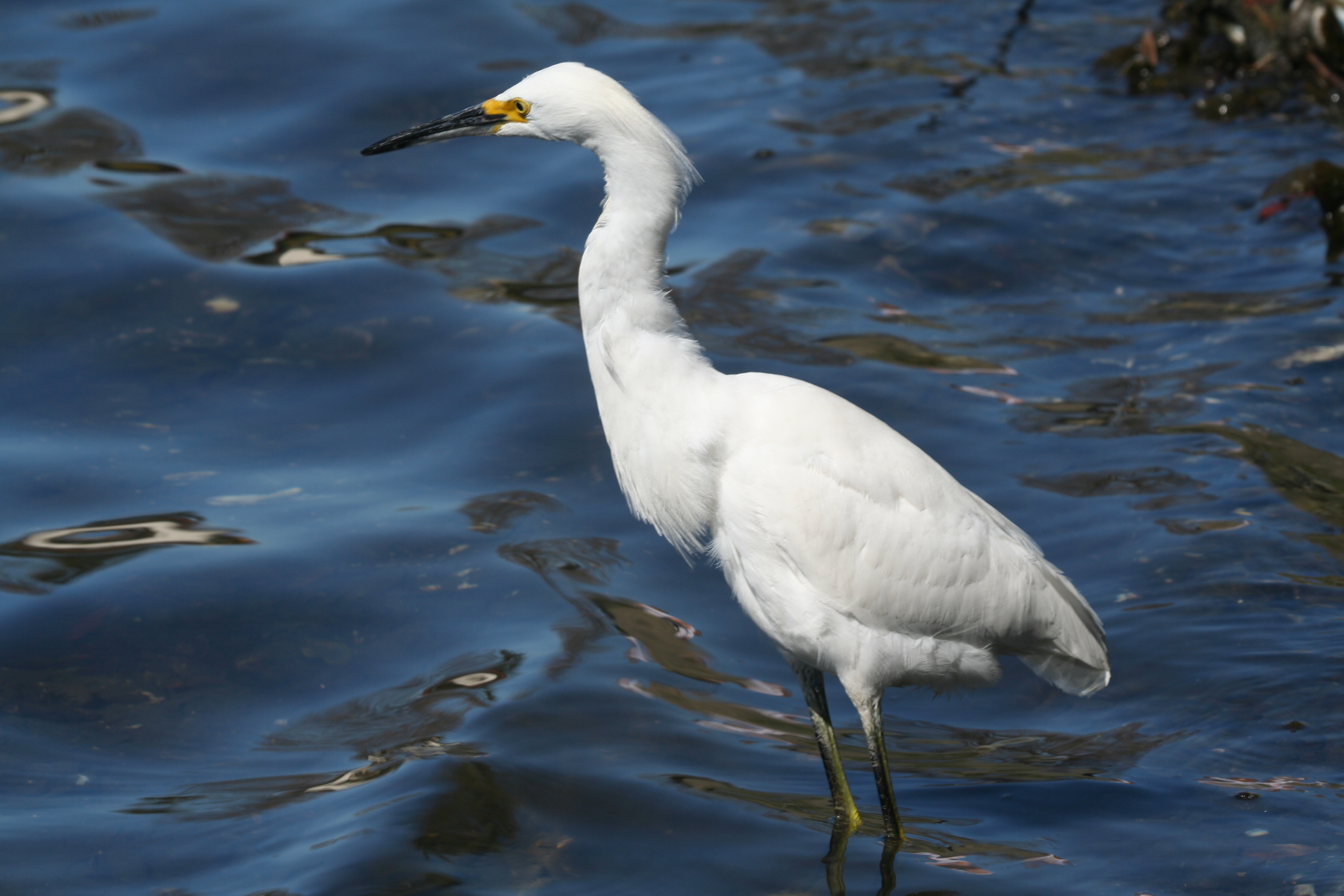
Snowy egret, widespread near water.

Order: Pelecaniformes Family: Ardeidae

The family Ardeidae contains the bitterns, herons, and egrets. Herons and egrets are medium to large wading birds with long necks and legs. Bitterns tend to be shorter necked and more wary. Unlike other long-neeecked birds such as storks, ibises, and spoonbills, members of Ardeidae fly with their necks retracted. Twelve species have been recorded in Chile.

- Stripe-backed bittern, Ixobrychus involucris
- Least bittern, Ixobrychus exilis (V)
- Whistling heron, Syrigma sibilatrix (V)
- Little blue heron, Egretta caerulea
- Tricolored heron, Egretta tricolor (V)
- Snowy egret, Egretta thula
- Yellow-crowned night-heron, Nyctanassa violacea (V)
- Black-crowned night-heron, Nycticorax nycticorax
- Striated heron, Butorides striata (V)
- Cattle egret, Ardea ibis
- Great egret, Ardea alba
- Cocoi heron, Ardea cocoi

== Ibises ==
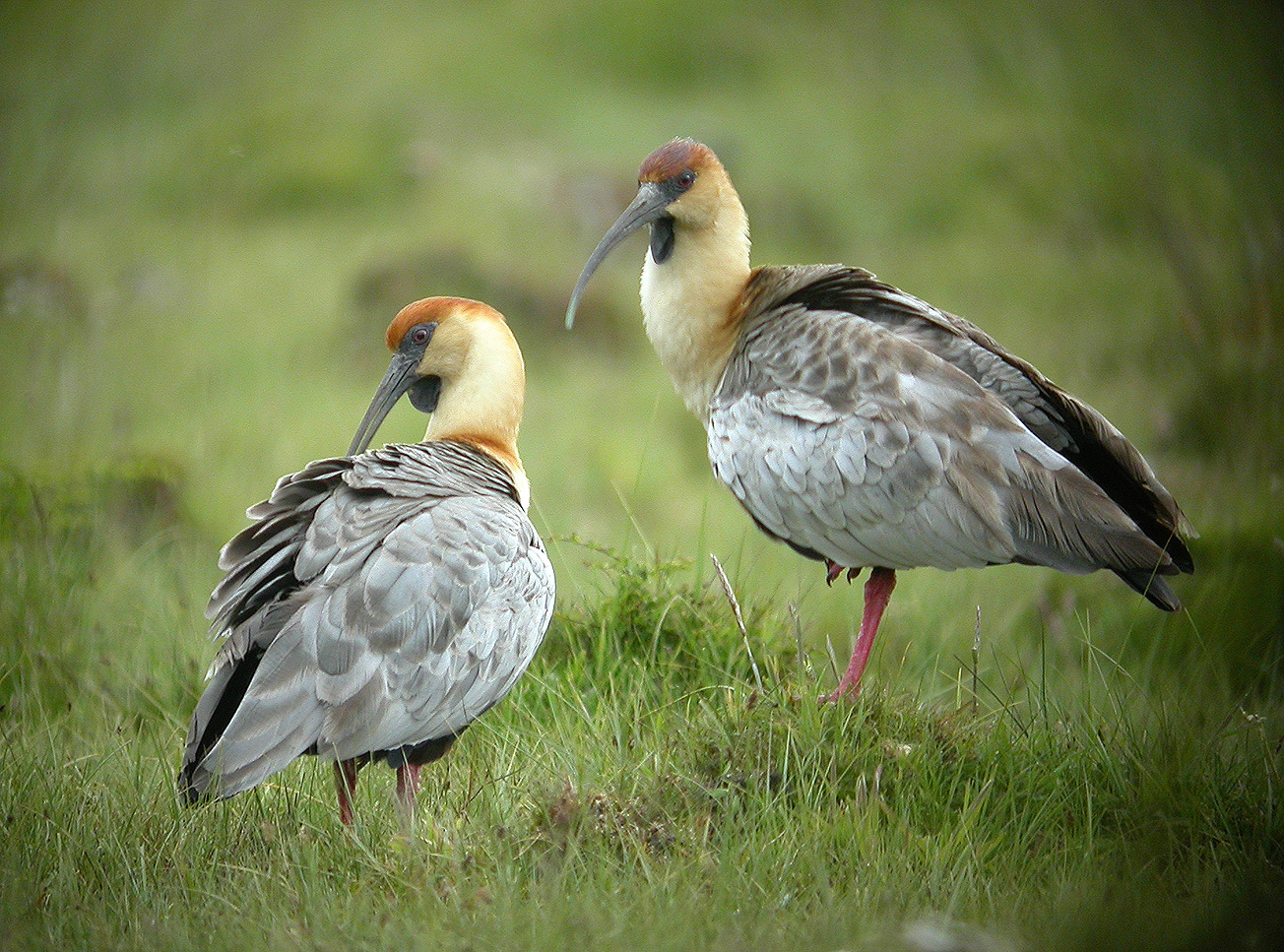
Black-faced ibises, often seen in flocks in open country

Order: Pelecaniformes Family: Threskiornithidae

Threskiornithidae is a family of large terrestrial and wading birds which includes the ibises and spoonbills. They have long, broad wings with 11 primary and about 20 secondary feathers. They are strong fliers and despite their size and weight, very capable soarers. Six species have been recorded in Chile.

- White-faced ibis, Plegadis chihi
- Puna ibis, Plegadis ridgwayi
- Bare-faced ibis, Phimosus infuscatus (V)
- Andean ibis, Theristicus branickii
- Black-faced ibis, Theristicus melanopis
- Roseate spoonbill, Platalea ajaja (V)

== New World vultures ==
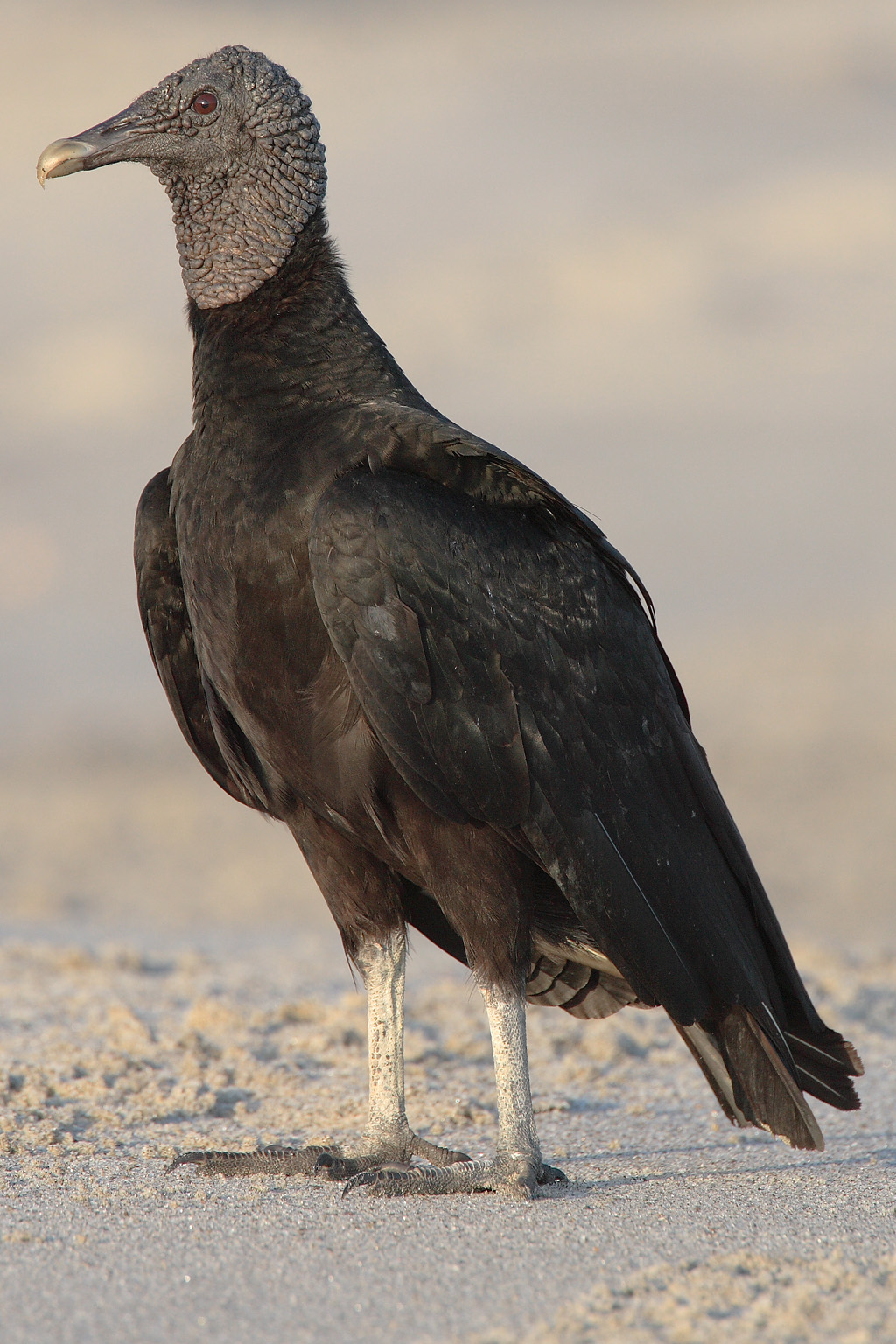
Black vulture, often scavenges in cities.

Order: Cathartiformes Family: Cathartidae

The New World vultures are not closely related to Old World vultures, but superficially resemble them because of convergent evolution. Like the Old World vultures, they are scavengers. However, unlike Old World vultures, which find carcasses by sight, New World vultures have a good sense of smell with which they locate carrion. Three species have been recorded in Chile.

- Andean condor, Vultur gryphus
- Black vulture, Coragyps atratus
- Turkey vulture, Cathartes aura

== Osprey ==
Order: Accipitriformes Family: Pandionidae

The family Pandionidae contains only one species, the osprey. The osprey is a medium-large raptor which is a specialist fish-eater with a worldwide distribution.

- Osprey, Pandion haliaetus

== Hawks ==
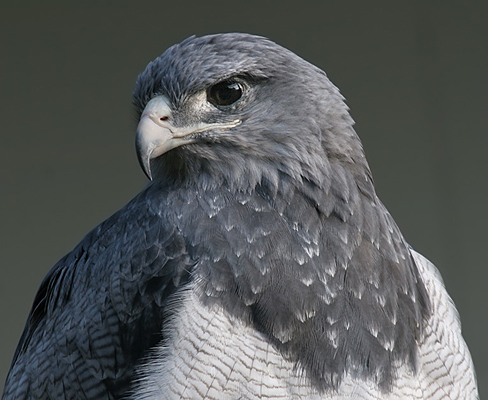
Black-chested buzzard-eagle, a large and widespread bird of prey.

Order: Accipitriformes Family: Accipitridae

Accipitridae is a family of birds of prey, which includes hawks, eagles, kites, harriers and Old World vultures. These birds have powerful hooked beaks for tearing flesh from their prey, strong legs, powerful talons and keen eyesight. Eleven species have been recorded in Chile.

- White-tailed kite, Elanus leucurus
- Bicolored hawk, Astur bicolor
- Cinereous harrier, Circus cinereus
- Long-winged harrier, Circus buffoni (V)
- Roadside hawk, Rupornis magnirostris (V)
- Harris's hawk, Parabuteo unicinctus
- Variable hawk, Geranoaetus polyosoma
- Black-chested buzzard-eagle, Geranoaetus melanoleucus
- White-throated hawk, Buteo albigula
- Swainson's hawk, Buteo swainsoni (V)
- Rufous-tailed hawk, Buteo ventralis

== Barn owls ==
Order: Strigiformes Family: Tytonidae

Barn owls are medium to large owls with large heads and characteristic heart-shaped faces. They have long strong legs with powerful talons. One species has been recorded in Chile.

- American barn owl, Tyto furcata

== Owls ==
Order: Strigiformes Family: Strigidae

The typical owls are small to large solitary nocturnal birds of prey. They have large forward-facing eyes and ears, a hawk-like beak and a conspicuous circle of feathers around each eye called a facial disk. Six species have been recorded in Chile.

- Magellanic horned owl, Bubo magellanicus
- Rufous-legged owl, Strix rufipes
- Peruvian pygmy-owl, Glaucidium peruanum
- Austral pygmy-owl, Glaucidium nanum
- Burrowing owl, Athene cunicularia
- Short-eared owl, Asio flammeus

== Kingfishers ==
Order: Coraciiformes Family: Alcedinidae

Kingfishers are medium-sized birds with large heads, long pointed bills, short legs, and stubby tails. Two species have been recorded in Chile.

- Ringed kingfisher, Megaceryle torquata
- Green kingfisher, Chloroceryle americana (V)

== Woodpeckers ==
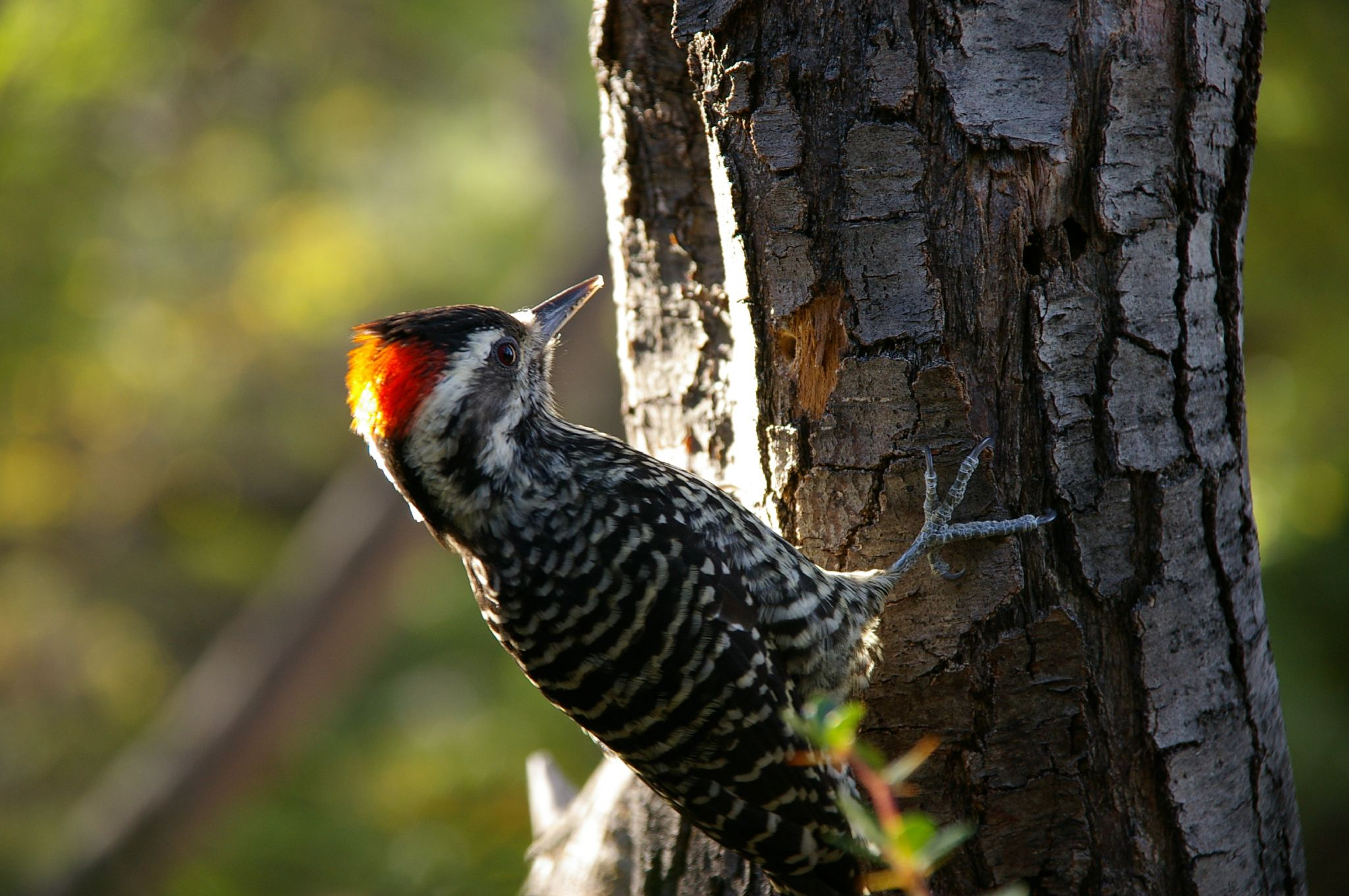
Striped woodpecker, often feeds on the ground as well as in trees.

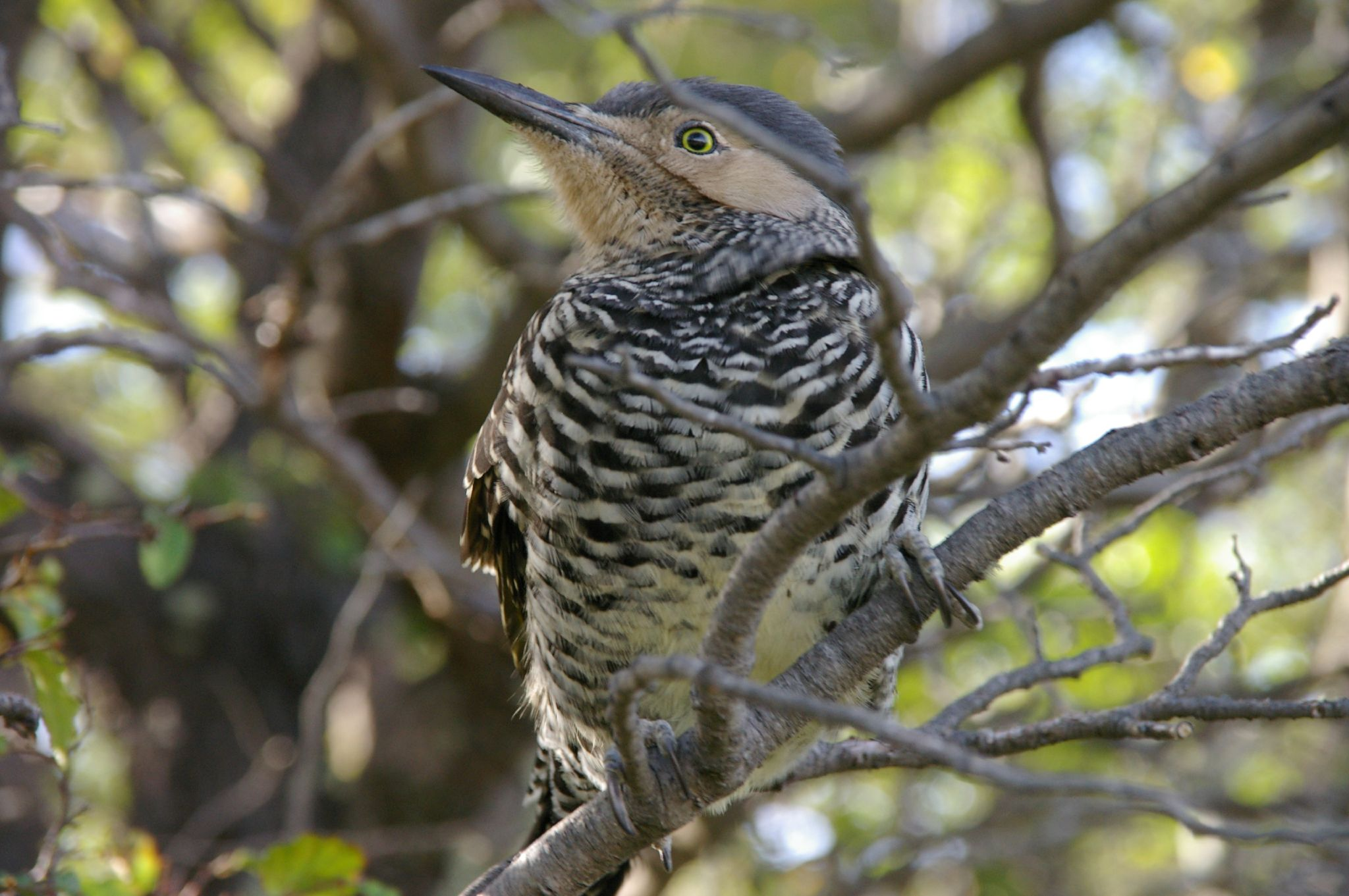
Chilean flicker in Torres del Paine National Park.

Order: Piciformes Family: Picidae

Woodpeckers are small to medium-sized birds with chisel-like beaks, short legs, stiff tails and long tongues used for capturing insects. Some species have feet with two toes pointing forward and two backward, while several species have only three toes. Many woodpeckers have the habit of tapping noisily on tree trunks with their beaks. Four species have been recorded in Chile.

- Striped woodpecker, Dryobates lignarius
- Magellanic woodpecker, Campephilus magellanicus
- Chilean flicker, Colaptes pitius
- Andean flicker, Colaptes rupicola

== Falcons ==
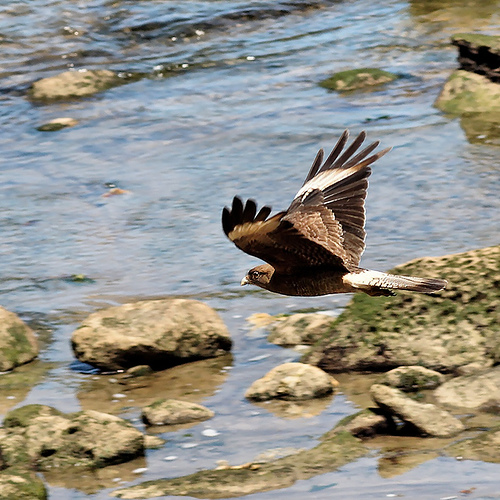
Chimango caracara, often common around human settlements.

Order: Falconiformes Family: Falconidae

Falconidae is a family of diurnal birds of prey. They differ from hawks, eagles and kites in that they kill with their beaks instead of their talons. Nine species have been recorded in Chile.

- Crested caracara, Caracara plancus
- Mountain caracara, Phalcoboenus megalopterus
- White-throated caracara, Phalcoboenus albogularis
- Striated caracara, Phalcoboenus australis
- Chimango caracara, Milvago chimango
- American kestrel, Falco sparverius
- Orange-breasted falcon, Falco deiroleucus (V)
- Aplomado falcon, Falco femoralis
- Peregrine falcon, Falco peregrinus

== New World and African parrots ==
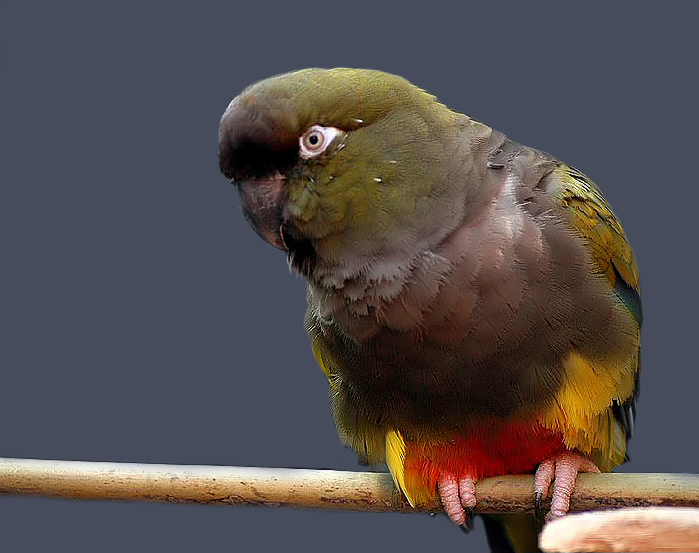
Burrowing parakeet, now rare and endangered in Chile.

Order: Psittaciformes Family: Psittacidae

Parrots are small to large birds with a characteristic curved beak. Their upper mandibles have slight mobility in the joint with the skull and they have a generally erect stance. All parrots are zygodactyl, having the four toes on each foot placed two at the front and two to the back. Five species have been recorded in Chile.

- Mountain parakeet, Psilopsiagon aurifrons
- Monk parakeet, Myiopsitta monachus (I)
- Austral parakeet, Enicognathus ferrugineus
- Slender-billed parakeet, Enicognathus leptorhynchus (E)
- Burrowing parakeet, Cyanoliseus patagonus

== Tapaculos ==
Order: Passeriformes Family: Rhinocryptidae

The tapaculos are small suboscine passeriform birds with numerous species in South and Central America. They are terrestrial species that fly only poorly on their short wings. They have strong legs, well-suited to their habitat of grassland or forest undergrowth. The tail is cocked and pointed. Eight species have been recorded in Chile.

- Chestnut-throated huet-huet, Pteroptochos castaneus
- Black-throated huet-huet, Pteroptochos tarnii
- Moustached turca, Pteroptochos megapodius (E)
- White-throated tapaculo, Scelorchilus albicollis (E)
- Chucao tapaculo, Scelorchilus rubecula
- Ochre-flanked tapaculo, Eugralla paradoxa
- Dusky tapaculo, Scytalopus fuscus (E)
- Magellanic tapaculo, Scytalopus magellanicus

== Ovenbirds ==
Order: Passeriformes Family: Furnariidae

Ovenbirds comprise a large family of small sub-oscine passerine bird species found in Central and South America. They are a diverse group of insectivores which gets its name from the elaborate "oven-like" clay nests built by some species, although others build stick nests or nest in tunnels or clefts in rock. Thirty-four species have been recorded in Chile.

- Common miner, Geositta cunicularia
- Puna miner, Geositta punensis
- Rufous-banded miner, Geositta rufipennis
- Grayish miner, Geositta maritima
- Short-billed miner, Geositta antarctica
- Creamy-rumped miner, Geositta isabellina
- White-throated treerunner, Pygarrhichas albogularis
- Rock earthcreeper, Ochetorhynchus andaecola (V)
- Straight-billed earthcreeper, Ochetorhynchus ruficaudus
- Band-tailed earthcreeper, Ochetorhynchus phoenicurus
- Crag chilia, Ochetorhynchus melanurus (E)
- Wren-like rushbird, Phleocryptes melanops
- Patagonian forest earthcreeper, Upucerthia saturatior
- Scale-throated earthcreeper, Upucerthia dumetaria
- White-throated earthcreeper, Upucerthia albigula
- Buff-breasted earthcreeper, Upucerthia validirostris
- Buff-winged cinclodes, Cinclodes fuscus
- Blackish cinclodes, Cinclodes antarcticus
- Cream-winged cinclodes, Cinclodes albiventris
- Gray-flanked cinclodes, Cinclodes oustaleti
- White-winged cinclodes, Cinclodes atacamensis
- Dark-bellied cinclodes, Cinclodes patagonicus
- Seaside cinclodes, Cinclodes nigrofumosus (E)
- Thorn-tailed rayadito, Aphrastura spinicauda
- Masafuera rayadito, Aphrastura masafuerae (E)
- Des Murs's wiretail, Sylviorthorhynchus desmursii
- Plain-mantled tit-spinetail, Leptasthenura aegithaloides
- Streaked tit-spinetail, Leptasthenura striata
- Creamy-breasted canastero, Asthenes dorbignyi
- Austral canastero, Asthenes anthoides
- Cordilleran canastero, Asthenes modesta
- Sharp-billed canastero, Asthenes pyrrholeuca
- Canyon canastero, Asthenes pudibunda
- Dusky-tailed canastero, Asthenes humicola (E)

== Cotingas ==
Order: Passeriformes Family: Cotingidae

The cotingas are birds of forests or forest edges in tropical South America. Comparatively little is known about this diverse group, although all have broad bills with hooked tips, rounded wings and strong legs. The males of many of the species are brightly colored or decorated with plumes or wattles. Two species have been recorded in Chile.

- White-tipped plantcutter, Phytotoma rutila (V)
- Rufous-tailed plantcutter, Phytotoma rara

== Tyrant flycatchers ==
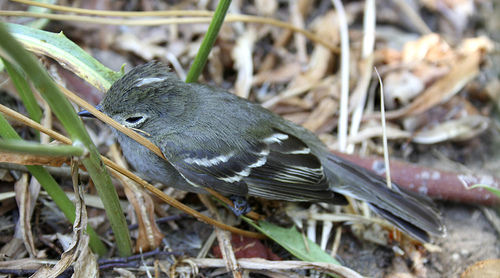
White-crested elaenia, a common summer visitor in much of Chile.

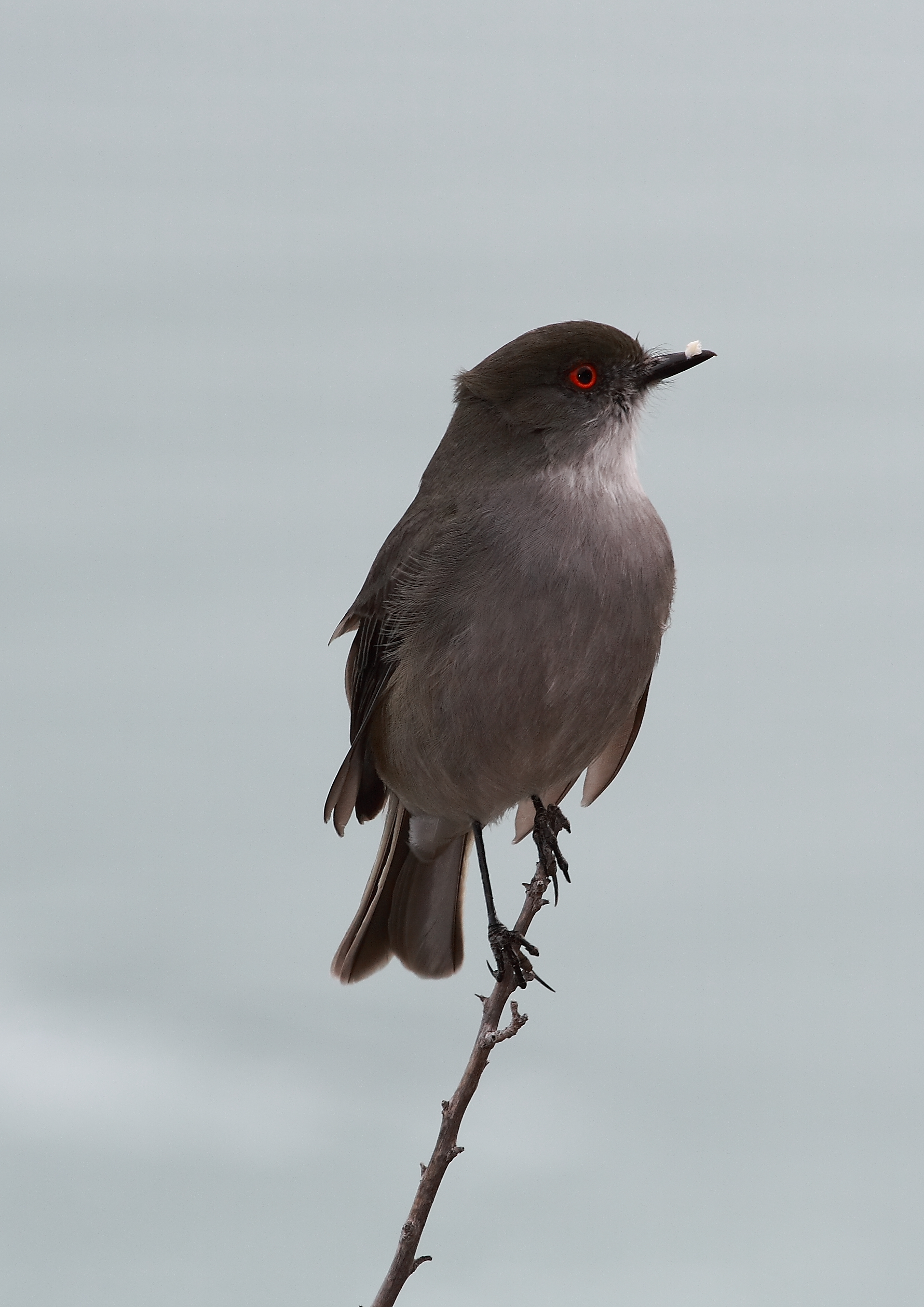
Fire-eyed diucon, often perches conspicuously on wires or the tops of bushes.

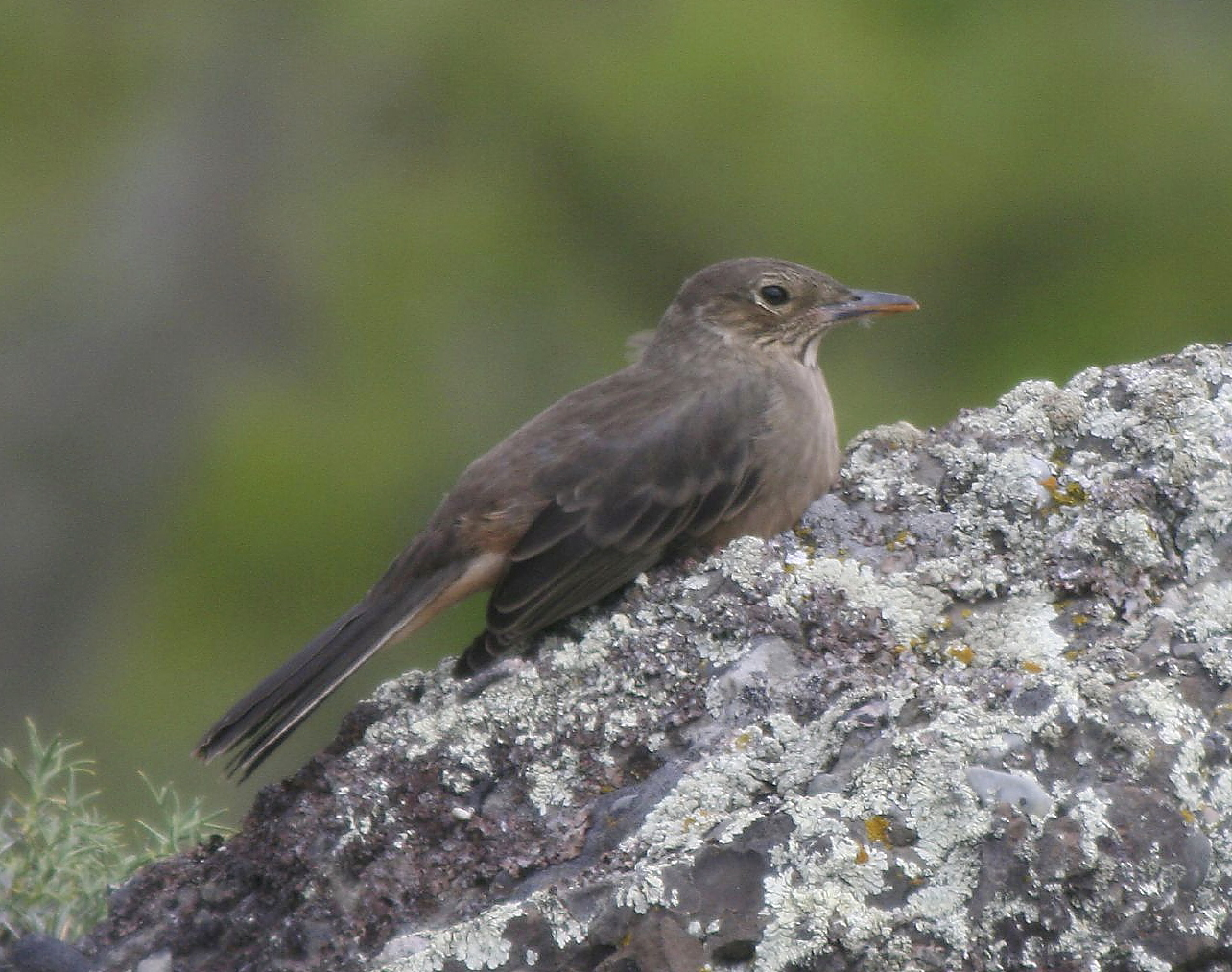
Great shrike-tyrant, a large flycatcher of scrub and open forest.

Order: Passeriformes Family: Tyrannidae

Tyrant flycatchers are passerine birds which occur throughout North and South America. They superficially resemble the Old World flycatchers, but are more robust and have stronger bills. They do not have the sophisticated vocal capabilities of the songbirds. Most, but not all, have plain coloring. As the name implies, most are insectivorous. Forty-nine species have been recorded in Chile.

- Cliff flycatcher, Hirundinea ferruginea (U)
- White-crested elaenia, Elaenia albiceps
- Pied-crested tit-tyrant, Anairetes reguloides
- Yellow-billed tit-tyrant, Anairetes flavirostris
- Tufted tit-tyrant, Anairetes parulus
- Juan Fernandez tit-tyrant, Anairetes fernandezianus (E)
- Ticking doradito, Pseudocolopteryx citreola
- Short-tailed field tyrant, Muscigralla brevicauda (V)
- Great kiskadee, Pitangus sulphuratus (V)
- Cattle tyrant, Machetornis rixosa (V)
- Boat-billed flycatcher, Megarynchus pitangua (V)
- Sulphur-bellied flycatcher, Myiodynastes luteiventris (V)
- Streaked flycatcher, Myiodynastes maculatus (V)
- Crowned slaty flycatcher, Empidonomus aurantioatrocristatus (V)
- Tropical kingbird, Tyrannus melancholicus (V)
- Fork-tailed flycatcher, Tyrannus savana (V)
- Eastern kingbird, Tyrannus tyrannus (V)
- Rufous casiornis, Casiornis rufus (V)
- Rufescent flycatcher, Myiophobus rufescens
- Patagonian tyrant, Colorhamphus parvirostris
- d'Orbigny's chat-tyrant, Ochthoeca oenanthoides
- White-browed chat-tyrant, Ochthoeca leucophrys
- Vermilion flycatcher, Pyrocephalus rubinus
- Austral negrito, Lessonia rufa
- Andean negrito, Lessonia oreas
- Spectacled tyrant, Hymenops perspicillatus
- White-winged black-tyrant, Knipolegus aterrimus (V)
- Spot-billed ground-tyrant, Muscisaxicola maculirostris
- Puna ground-tyrant, Muscisaxicola juninensis
- Cinereous ground-tyrant, Muscisaxicola cinereus
- White-fronted ground-tyrant, Muscisaxicola albifrons
- Ochre-naped ground-tyrant, Muscisaxicola flavinucha
- Rufous-naped ground-tyrant, Muscisaxicola rufivertex
- Dark-faced ground-tyrant, Muscisaxicola maclovianus
- White-browed ground-tyrant, Muscisaxicola albilora
- Cinnamon-bellied ground-tyrant, Muscisaxicola capistratus
- Black-fronted ground-tyrant, Muscisaxicola frontalis
- Rufous-webbed bush-tyrant, Cnemarchus rufipennis
- Fire-eyed diucon, Pyrope pyrope
- Black-crowned monjita, Neoxolmis coronatus (V)
- Chocolate-vented tyrant, Neoxolmis rufiventris
- Rusty-backed monjita, Neoxolmis rubetra (V)
- Black-billed shrike-tyrant, Agriornis montanus
- White-tailed shrike-tyrant, Agriornis albicauda
- Great shrike-tyrant, Agriornis lividus
- Gray-bellied shrike-tyrant, Agriornis micropterus
- Lesser shrike-tyrant, Agriornis murinus (V)
- Western wood-pewee, Contopus sordidulus (V)
- Many-colored rush tyrant, Tachuris rubrigastra

== Vireos ==
Order: Passeriformes Family: Vireonidae

The vireos are a group of small to medium-sized passerine birds. They are typically greenish in color and resemble wood warblers apart from their heavier bills. Two species have been recorded in Chile.

- Red-eyed vireo, Vireo olivaceus (V)
- Chivi vireo, Vireo chivi (V)

== Swallows ==
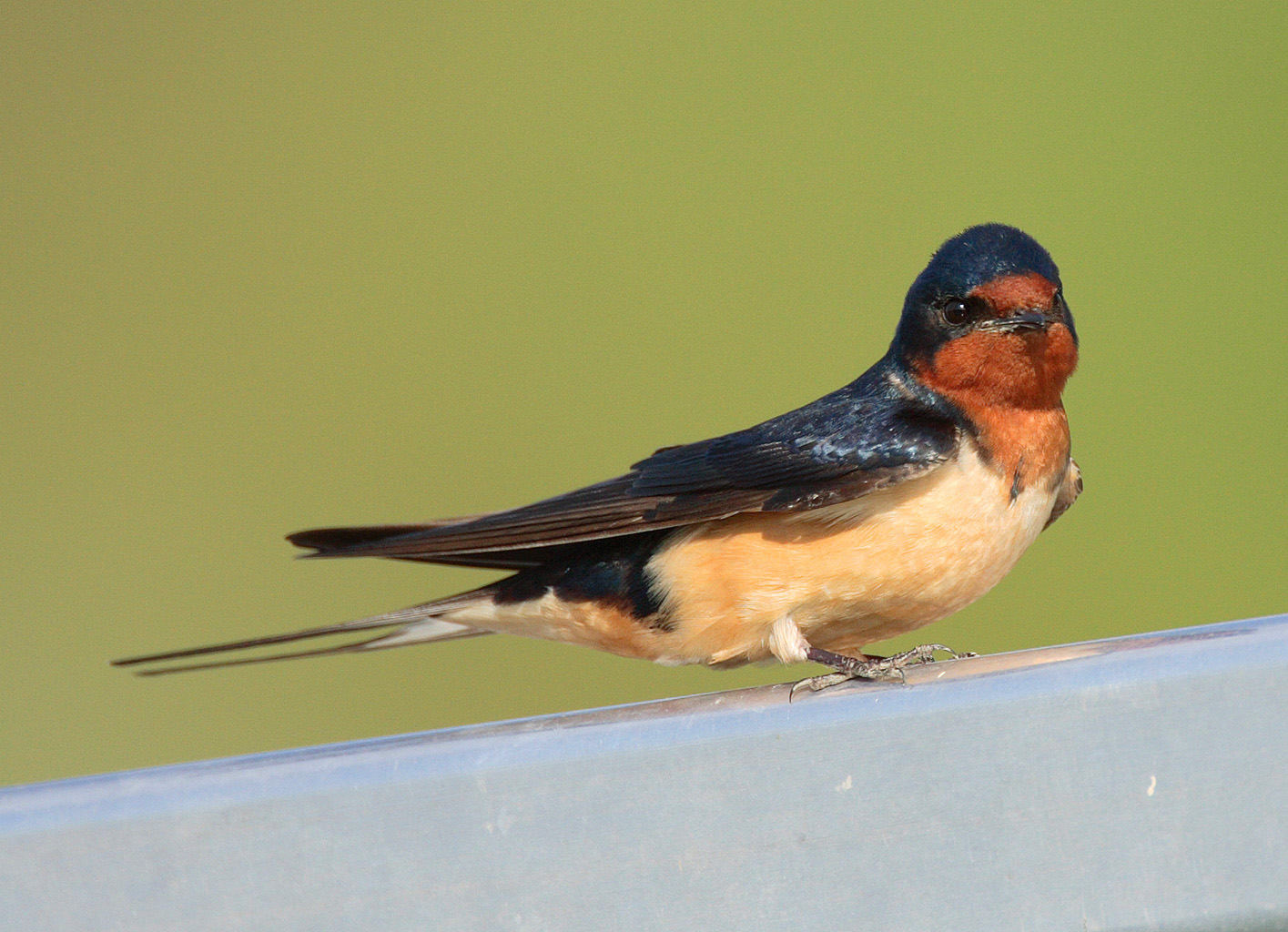
Barn swallow, a migrant from North America

Order: Passeriformes Family: Hirundinidae

The family Hirundinidae is adapted to aerial feeding. They have a slender streamlined body, long pointed wings and a short bill with a wide gape. The feet are adapted to perching rather than walking, and the front toes are partially joined at the base. Eleven species have been recorded in Chile.

- Blue-and-white swallow, Pygochelidon cyanoleuca
- Tawny-headed swallow, Alopochelidon fucata (V)
- Andean swallow, Orochelidon andecola
- Brown-chested martin, Progne tapera (V)
- Gray-breasted martin, Progne chalybea (V)
- Southern martin, Progne elegans
- Peruvian martin, Progne murphyi
- Chilean swallow, Tachycineta leucopyga
- Bank swallow, Riparia riparia
- Barn swallow, Hirundo rustica
- Cliff swallow, Petrochelidon pyrrhonota

== Wrens ==
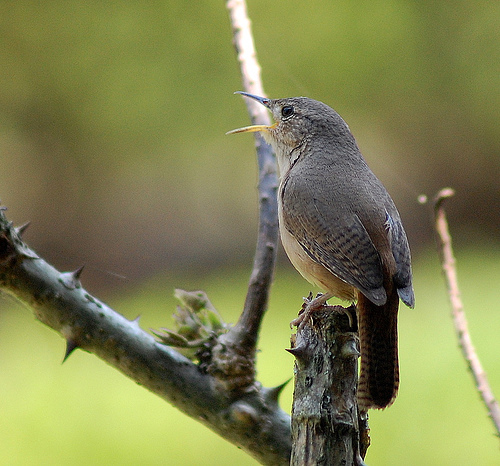
Southern house-wren, widespread in a variety of habitats.

Order: Passeriformes Family: Troglodytidae

The wrens are mainly small and inconspicuous except for their loud songs. These birds have short wings and thin down-turned bills. Several species often hold their tails upright. All are insectivorous. Two species have been recorded in Chile.

- Southern house-wren, Troglodytes musculus
- Grass wren, Cistothorus platensis

== Thrushes ==
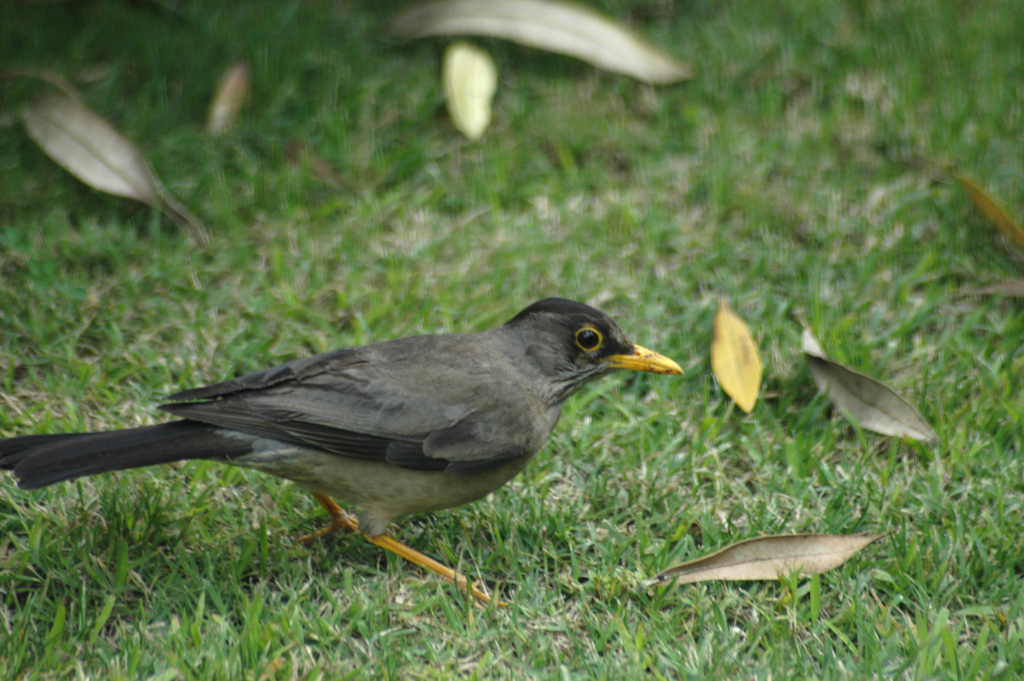
Austral thrush in Santiago, often seen in parks and gardens.

Order: Passeriformes Family: Turdidae

The thrushes are a group of passerine birds that occur mainly in the Old World. They are plump, soft plumaged, small to medium-sized insectivores or sometimes omnivores, often feeding on the ground. Many have attractive songs. Five species have been recorded in Chile.

- Veery, Catharus fuscescens (V)
- Swainson's thrush, Catharus ustulatus (V)
- Austral thrush, Turdus falcklandii
- Creamy-bellied thrush, Turdus amaurochalinus (V)
- Chiguanco thrush, Turdus chiguanco

== Mockingbirds ==
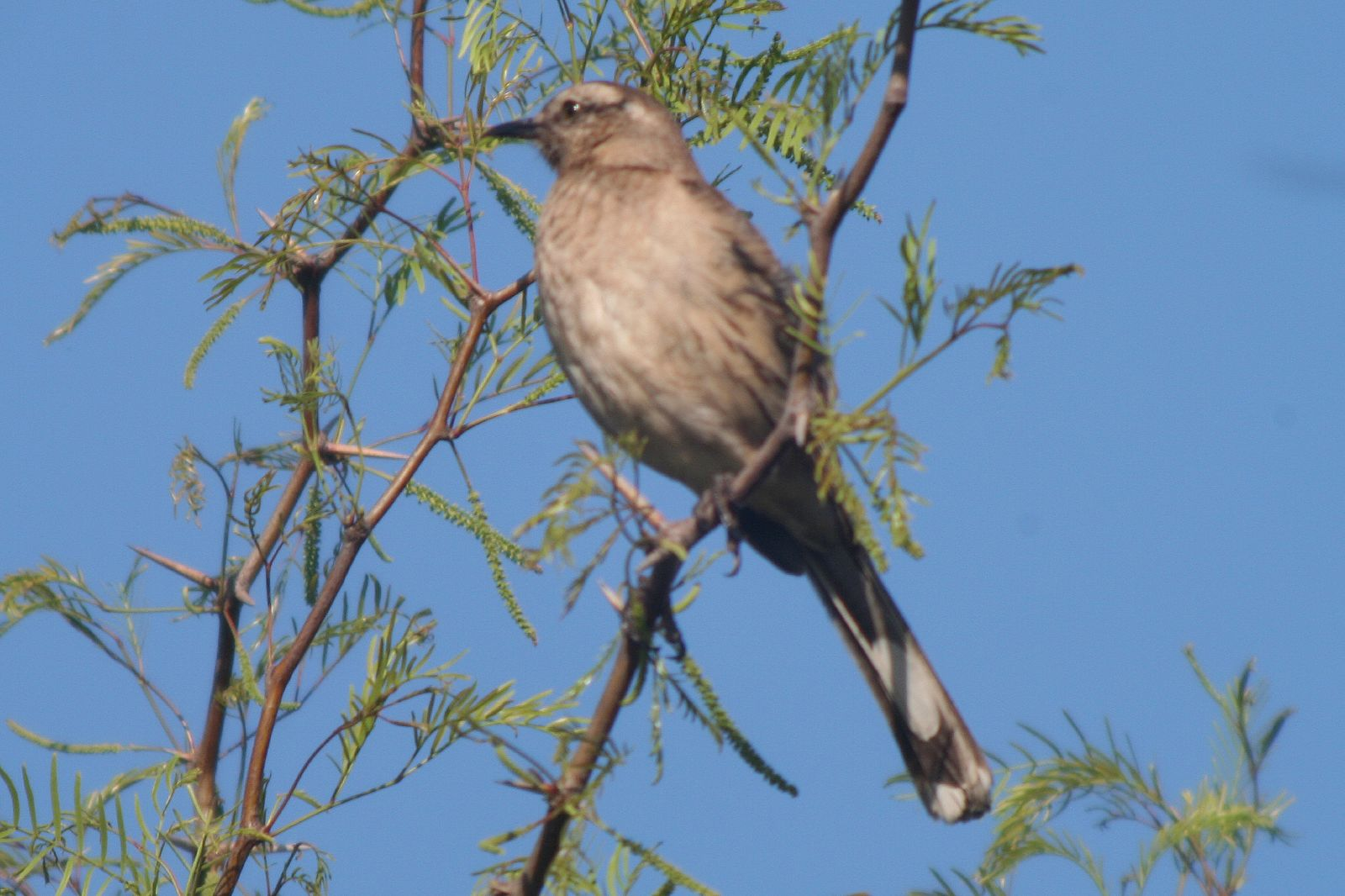
Chilean mockingbird, a near-endemic bird of Chile.

Order: Passeriformes Family: Mimidae

The mimids are a family of passerine birds that includes thrashers, mockingbirds, tremblers and the New World catbirds. These birds are notable for their vocalizations, especially their ability to mimic a wide variety of birds and other sounds heard outdoors. Their coloring tends towards dull-grays and browns. Five species have been recorded in Chile.

- Long-tailed mockingbird, Mimus longicaudatus (U)
- Chilean mockingbird, Mimus thenca
- Patagonian mockingbird, Mimus patagonicus
- Chalk-browed mockingbird, Mimus saturninus (V)
- White-banded mockingbird, Mimus triurus

== Starlings ==
Order: Passeriformes Family: Sturnidae

Starlings are small to medium-sized passerine birds. Their flight is strong and direct and they are very gregarious. Their preferred habitat is fairly open country. They eat insects and fruit. Plumage is typically dark with a metallic sheen. One species has been recorded in Chile.

- European starling, Sturnus vulgaris (I) (V)

== Old World sparrows ==
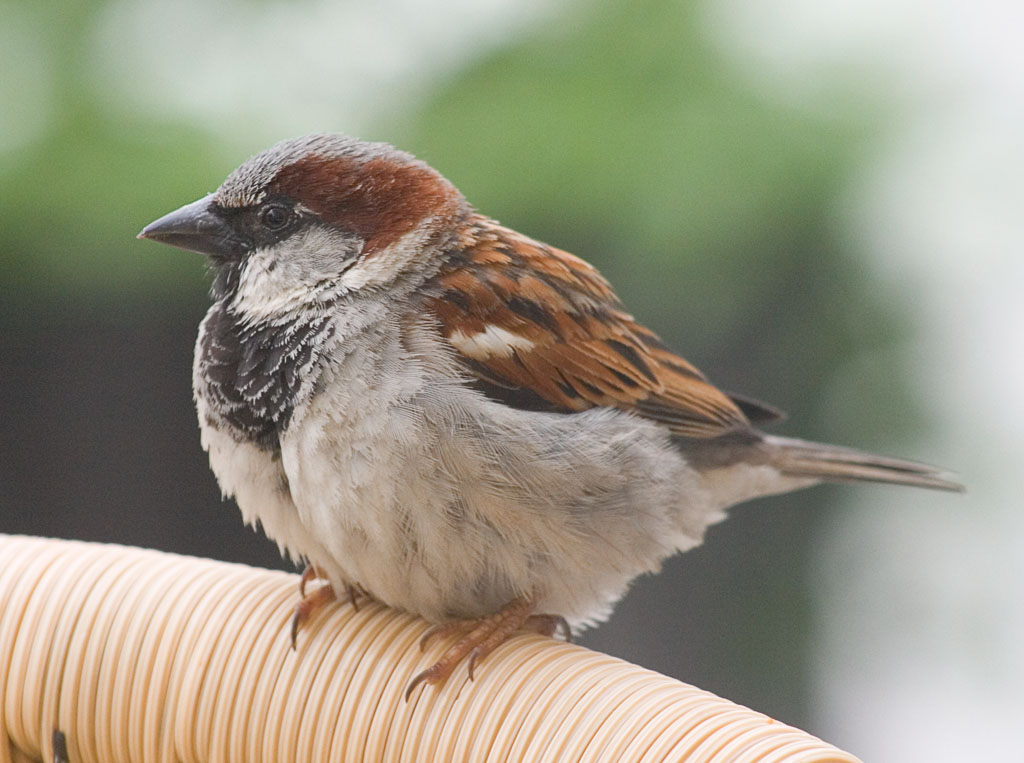
House sparrow, introduced in 1904.

Order: Passeriformes Family: Passeridae

Sparrows are small passerine birds. In general, sparrows tend to be small, plump, brown or gray birds with short tails and short powerful beaks. Sparrows are seed eaters, but they also consume small insects. One species has been recorded in Chile.

- House sparrow, Passer domesticus (I)

== Pipits and wagtails ==
Order: Passeriformes Family: Motacillidae

Motacillidae is a family of small passerine birds with medium to long tails. They include the wagtails, longclaws, and pipits. They are slender ground-feeding insectivores of open country. Three species have been recorded in Chile.

- Peruvian pipit, Anthus peruvianus
- Correndera pipit, Anthus correndera
- Hellmayr's pipit, Anthus hellmayri

== Finches ==
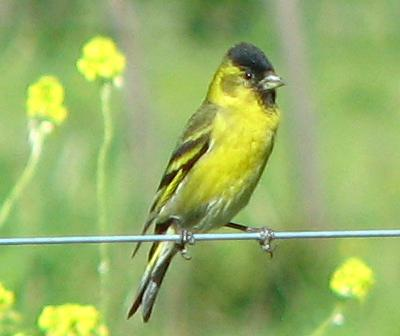
Black-chinned siskin, common in southern and central Chile.

Order: Passeriformes Family: Fringillidae

Finches are seed-eating passerine birds, that are small to moderately large and have a strong beak, usually conical and in some species very large. All have twelve tail feathers and nine primaries. These birds have a bouncing flight with alternating bouts of flapping and gliding on closed wings, and most sing well. Five species have been recorded in Chile.

- Thick-billed siskin, Spinus crassirostris
- Hooded siskin, Spinus magellanica
- Black siskin, Spinus atrata
- Yellow-rumped siskin, Spinus uropygialis
- Black-chinned siskin, Spinus barbata

== Sparrows ==
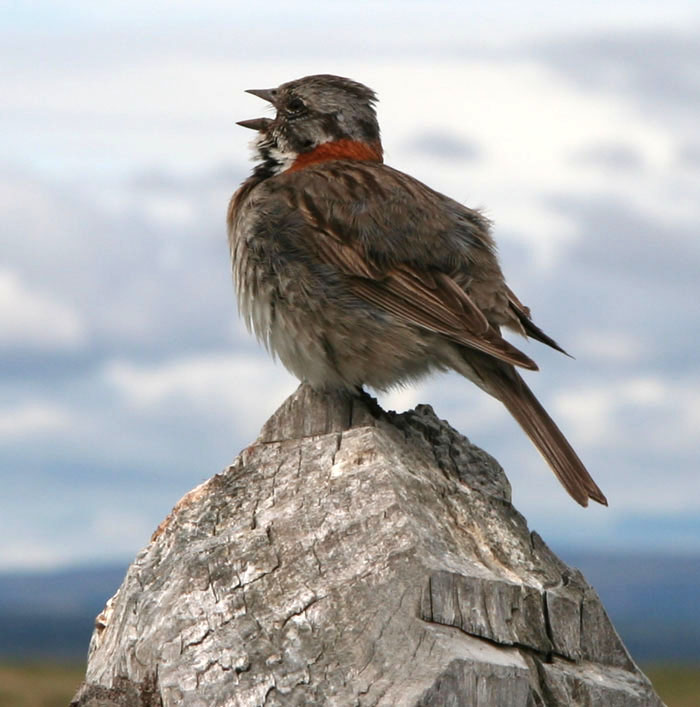
Rufous-collared sparrow near Punta Arenas, one of Chile's commonest birds.

Order: Passeriformes Family: Passerellidae

Most of the species are known as sparrows, but these birds are not closely related to the Old World sparrows which are in the family Passeridae. Many of these have distinctive head patterns. One species has been recorded in Chile.

- Rufous-collared sparrow, Zonotrichia capensis

== Blackbirds ==
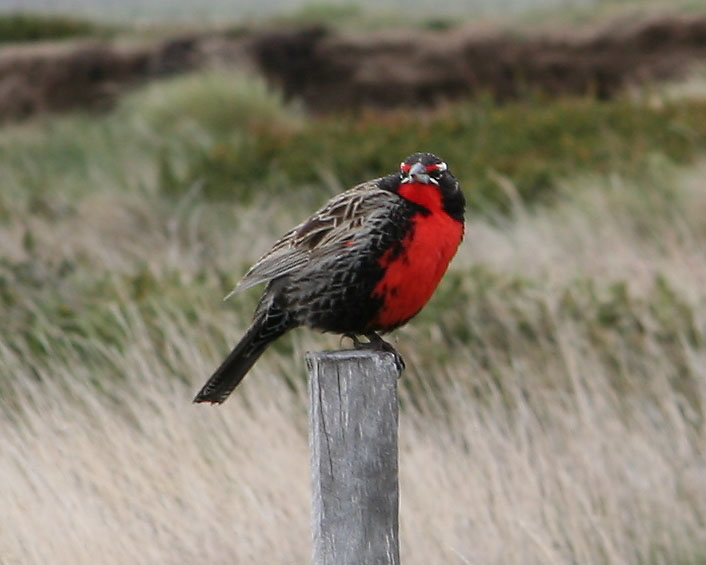
Long-tailed meadowlark, a common bird of open country.

Order: Passeriformes Family: Icteridae

The icterids are a group of small to medium-sized, often colorful, passerine birds restricted to the New World and include the grackles, New World blackbirds and New World orioles. Most species have black as the predominant plumage color, often enlivened by yellow, orange or red. Eleven species have been recorded in Chile.

- Bobolink, Dolichonyx oryzivorus (V)
- White-browed meadowlark, Leistes superciliaris (V)
- Peruvian meadowlark, Leistes bellicosus
- Long-tailed meadowlark, Leistes loyca
- Variable oriole, Icterus pyrrhopterus (V)
- Baltimore oriole, Icterus galbula (V)
- Screaming cowbird, Molothrus rufoaxillaris
- Shiny cowbird, Molothrus bonariensis (I)
- Austral blackbird, Curaeus curaeus
- Grayish baywing, Agelaioides badius (U)
- Yellow-winged blackbird, Agelasticus thilius

== Wood-warblers ==
Order: Passeriformes Family: Parulidae

The wood-warblers are a group of small, often colorful, passerine birds restricted to the New World. Most are arboreal, but some are terrestrial. Most members of this family are insectivores. Nine species have been recorded in Chile.

- Northern waterthrush, Parkesia noveboracensis (V)
- Tennessee warbler, Leiothlypis peregrina (V)
- Masked yellowthroat, Geothlypis aequinoctialis (V)
- American redstart, Setophaga ruticilla (V)
- Tropical parula, Setophaga pitiayumi (V)
- Blackburnian warbler, Setophaga fusca (V)
- Blackpoll warbler, Setophaga striata (V)
- Black-throated green warbler, Setophaga virens (V)
- Canada warbler, Cardellina canadensis (V)

== Cardinals ==
Order: Passeriformes Family: Cardinalidae

The cardinals are a family of robust, seed-eating birds with strong bills. They are typically associated with open woodland. The sexes usually have distinct plumages. Two species have been recorded in Chile.

- Summer tanager, Piranga rubra (V)
- Black-backed grosbeak, Pheucticus aureoventris (V)

== Tanagers ==
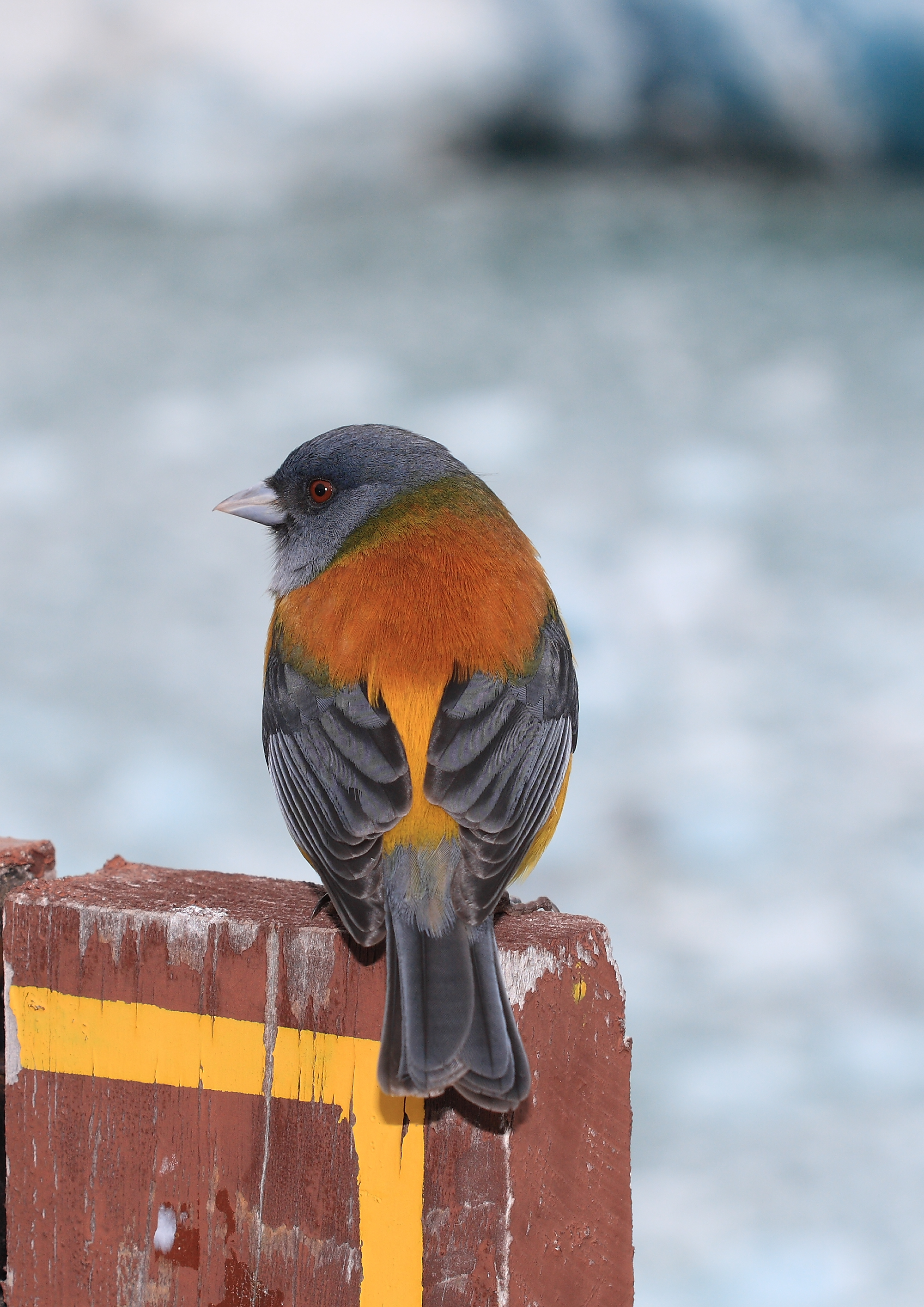
Patagonian sierra finch, found in forest and forest edge in the south.

Order: Passeriformes Family: Thraupidae

The tanagers are a large group of small to medium-sized passerine birds restricted to the New World, mainly in the tropics. Many species are brightly colored. As a family they are omnivorous, but individual species specialize in eating fruits, seeds, insects, or other types of food. Thirty-six species have been recorded in Chile.

- Giant conebill, Conirostrum binghami
- Tamarugo conebill, Conirostrum tamarugense
- Cinereous conebill, Conirostrum cinereum
- Puna yellow-finch, Sicalis lutea
- Bright-rumped yellow-finch, Sicalis uropygialis
- Greater yellow-finch, Sicalis auriventris
- Greenish yellow-finch, Sicalis olivascens
- Patagonian yellow-finch, Sicalis lebruni
- Saffron finch, Sicalis flaveola
- Grassland yellow-finch, Sicalis luteola
- Raimondi's yellow-finch, Sicalis raimondii
- Black-hooded sierra finch, Phrygilus atriceps
- Gray-hooded sierra finch, Phrygilus gayi
- Patagonian sierra finch, Phrygilus patagonicus
- Mourning sierra finch, Phrygilus fruticeti
- Red-backed sierra finch, Phrygilus dorsalis
- White-throated sierra finch, Phrygilus erythronotus
- Band-tailed sierra finch, Phrygilus alaudinus
- Plumbeous sierra finch, Geospizopsis unicolor
- Ash-breasted sierra finch, Geospizopsis plebejus
- White-bridled finch, Melanodera melanodera
- Yellow-bridled finch, Melanodera xanthogramma
- Band-tailed seedeater, Catamenia analis
- Black-throated flowerpiercer, Diglossa brunneiventris
- Blue-black grassquit, Volatinia jacarina
- Swallow tanager, Tersina viridis (V)
- Lined seedeater, Sporophila lineola (V)
- Chestnut-throated seedeater, Sporophila telasco
- Double-collared seedeater, Sporophila caerulescens (V)
- Golden-billed saltator, Saltator aurantiirostris
- Slender-billed finch, Xenospingus concolor
- Ringed warbling finch, Microspingus torquatus (V)
- Glacier finch, Diuca speculifer
- Diuca finch, Diuca diuca
- Blue-and-yellow tanager, Rauenia bonariensis
- Sayaca tanager, Thraupis sayaca (V)

== See also ==
- Wildlife of Chile
- List of birds
- Lists of birds by region
