= Spinetail =

Spinetail can refer to birds of several genera:

- Family Apodidae (swifts):
  - Mearnsia
  - Zoonavena
  - Telacanthura
  - Rhaphidura
  - Neafrapus
- Family Furnariidae (ovenbirds):
  - Schoeniophylax
  - Synallaxis
  - Siptornopsis
  - Gyalophylax
  - Hellmayrea
  - Cranioleuca
  - Certhiaxis
