= Reedhaunters =

Group of birds

The reedhaunters are two species of marsh-dwelling Furnariid birds found in south-eastern Brazil, north-eastern Argentina and Uruguay. They occupy a similar ecological niche to some reed warblers.

The two species are superficially similar, and often included in the same genus, Limnornis, but evidence suggests the straight-billed reedhaunter is closer to the Cranioleuca spinetails than it is to the curve-billed reedhaunter.

== Species ==
- Curve-billed reedhaunter (Limnornis curvirostris).
- Straight-billed reedhaunter (Limnoctites rectirostris).
