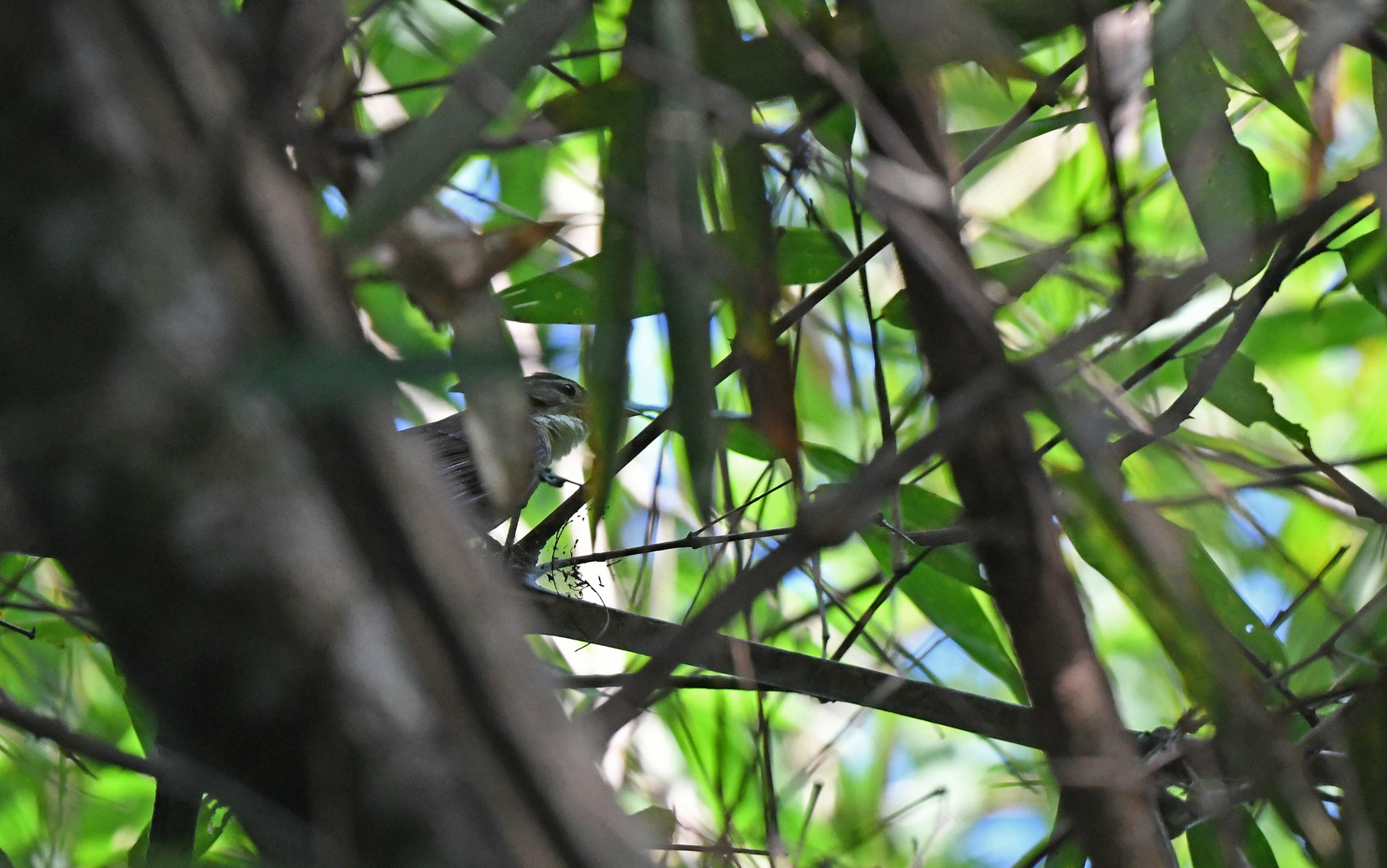

Conservation status
- Least Concern (IUCN 3.1)

Scientific classification
- Kingdom: Animalia
- Phylum: Chordata
- Class: Aves
- Order: Passeriformes
- Family: Furnariidae
- Genus: Anabazenops
- Species: A. dorsalis

Binomial name
- Anabazenops dorsalis (Sclater, PL & Salvin, 1880)

Synonyms
- Automolus dorsalis; Philydor dorsalis

= Bamboo foliage-gleaner =

Species of bird

The bamboo foliage-gleaner (Anabazenops dorsalis), also known as the crested foliage-gleaner or dusky-cheeked foliage-gleaner, is a species of bird in the Furnariinae subfamily of the ovenbird family Furnariidae. It is found in Bolivia, Brazil, Colombia, Ecuador, and Peru.

== Taxonomy and systematics ==
The bamboo foliage-gleaner has been placed by different authors in genera Automolus and Philydor but genetic data support its placement in Anabazenops. It shares the genus with the white-collared foliage-gleaner (A. fuscus) and is monotypic.

== Description ==
The bamboo foliage-gleaner is about 19 cm (7.5 in) long. It has a thick medium-length bill. The sexes' plumages are alike. Adults have a narrow grayish buff supercilium, grayish lores, and a creamy white malar area on an otherwise grayish brown face. Their crown, nape, back, and rump are dull reddish brown, with no markings except faint scalloping on the crown. Their uppertail coverts are dull chestnut and their tail dark chestnut. Their wings are dull brown with some dull tawny at the bend. Their throat is creamy white, their breast and belly gray, their flanks olive-brownish, and their undertail coverts grayish with dull rufescent mixed in. Their iris is brown to dark brown, their maxilla dusky horn to gray, their mandible ivory to olive-gray, and their legs and feet olive to yellowish olive. Juveniles are similar to adults with more rufous upperparts and a tawny-buff tinge to the supercilium and underparts.

== Distribution and habitat ==
The bamboo foliage-gleaner is found from Caquetá Department in southern Colombia south in the extreme western Amazon Basin through Ecuador, Peru, and a bit of western Brazil into Bolivia as far as La Paz Department. It also occurs disjunctly in central Brazil's Rondônia and Mato Grosso states. It is a bird of the lowlands and Andean foothills, where it inhabits the interior and edges of humid primary forest and also secondary forest. It is almost always found near rivers and streams. In most areas it favors stands of Guadua bamboo and in Ecuador also thickets of Gynerium cane. In elevation it mostly occurs between 200 and 1,000 m (700 and 3,300 ft) but reaches 1,200 m (3,900 ft) in Colombia and 1,300 m (4,300 ft) locally in Ecuador.

== Behavior ==
=== Movement ===
The bamboo foliage-gleaner is a year-round resident throughout its range.

=== Feeding ===
The bamboo foliage-gleaner feeds on arthropods. It usually forages singly or in pairs but will occasionally join mixed-species feeding flocks. It forages almost entirely in the understory of bamboo or cane, typically between 4 and 8 m (13 and 26 ft) above the ground, where it hitches up and along vertical and horizontal stems. It typically gleans its prey from branches, dead leaves, and suspended debris; even when not in bamboo it forages among dead leaves.

=== Breeding ===
The bamboo foliage-gleaner's breeding season has not been defined, but in Peru includes August. It is assumed to be monogamous. One nest was described as a deep cup of thin dry plant fibers in a natural cavity in a dead bamboo stem. Nothing else is known about the species' breeding biology.

=== Vocalization ===
The bamboo foliage-gleaner's song is "a measured 'tcho-tcho-tcho-tcho-tcho...' " with a variable number of notes. Pairs sometimes sing an antiphonal duet. The species' contact call is "a harsh 'klek' or 'cheff' ".

== Status ==
The IUCN has assessed the bamboo foliage-gleaner as being of Least Concern. It has a very large range; its population size is not known but is believed to be stable. No immediate threats have been identified. It is considered rare to uncommon. It occurs in a few protected sites but its "[r]estriction to bamboo naturally limits its global population size".
