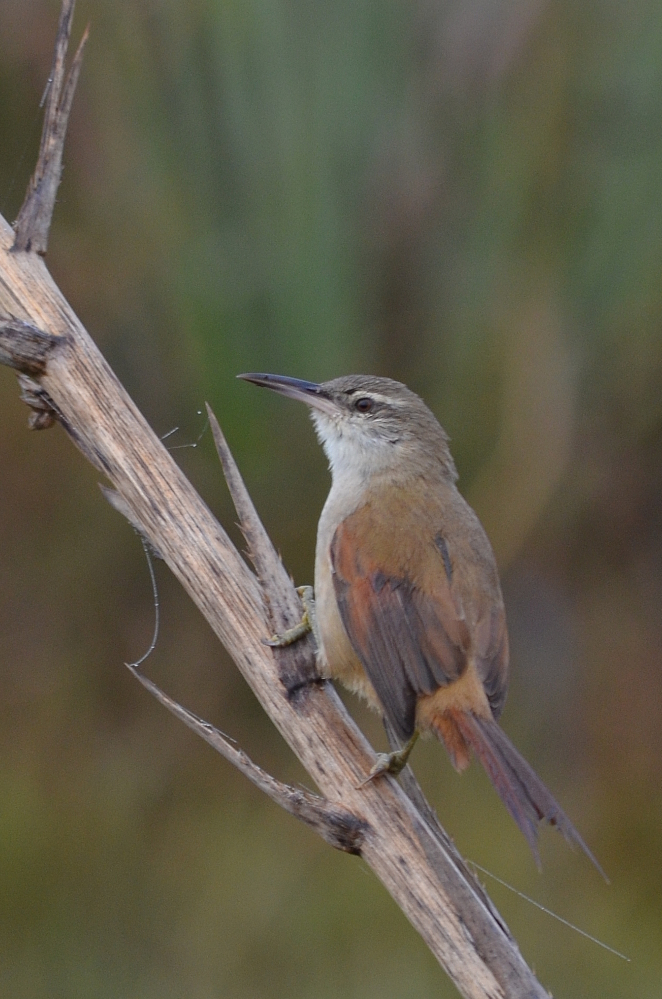

Conservation status
- Near Threatened (IUCN 3.1)

Scientific classification
- Kingdom: Animalia
- Phylum: Chordata
- Class: Aves
- Order: Passeriformes
- Family: Furnariidae
- Genus: Limnoctites
- Species: L. rectirostris

Binomial name
- Limnoctites rectirostris (Gould, 1839)

Synonyms
- Limnornis rectirostris

= Straight-billed reedhaunter =

Species of bird

The straight-billed reedhaunter (Limnoctites rectirostris) is a South American bird species in the family Furnariidae.

== Taxonomy ==
Formerly it was placed in Limnornis with the curve-billed reedhaunter (Limnornis curvirostris) which lives in the same general region and habitat, and thus shares some adaptations with L. rectirostris. But L. rectirostris is closer to the typical spinetails (Cranioleuca) than to the curve-billed reedhaunter, and is the sister species of the sulphur-bearded reedhaunter.

== Behaviour ==
As with many of its relatives, rather little is known about its reproductive habits. In southern Uruguay, a juvenile was observed in mid-January (i.e. midsummer).

== Distribution and habitat ==
This bird is found in north-eastern Argentina, south-eastern Brazil and Uruguay. In its range, it is essentially limited to marshy areas in pampas and campos from coastal lowlands to highlands. In Brazil, it is found in Rio Grande do Sul and Santa Catarina States. In Argentina, it occurs in Entre Ríos and the extreme north-east of Buenos Aires Provinces. In Uruguay, it is limited to the eastern and southern part of the country. In recent years, it has been recorded in Cerro Largo, Canelones, Maldonado – where Charles Darwin found it in 1833 at Laguna José Ignacio and Laguna del Diario, where it can still be found –, Rocha, San José and Treinta y Tres Departments (especially at the Quebrada de los Cuervos). From Lavalleja Department, there are only records from 1994, but the bird probably is still found there.

This species prefers marshy and swampy areas between sea level and 1,100 m ASL. A key feature of prime habitat is an abundant growth of caraguata (spiny eryngos, Eryngium spp.), such as E. pandanifolium which it utilizes particularly in upland localities. It is sometimes claimed that the two reedhaunters differ in microhabitat preference, occurring sympatrically in the same region but not within the same locality, but this seems to be incorrect.

== Status and conservation ==
The straight-billed reedhaunter may be common in suitable habitat, but globally its numbers are decreasing and is becoming rare due to habitat loss. Significant threats are pollution and the draining of wetlands, particularly for construction on the outskirts of larger towns. Invasive willows (Salix spp.) as well as plantations of eucalypt (Eucalyptus spp.) and pine (Pinus spp.) are also detrimental to habitat quality. The species occurs in some protected areas, such as Área Protegida Quebrada de los Cuervos in Uruguay's Treinta y Tres Department.
