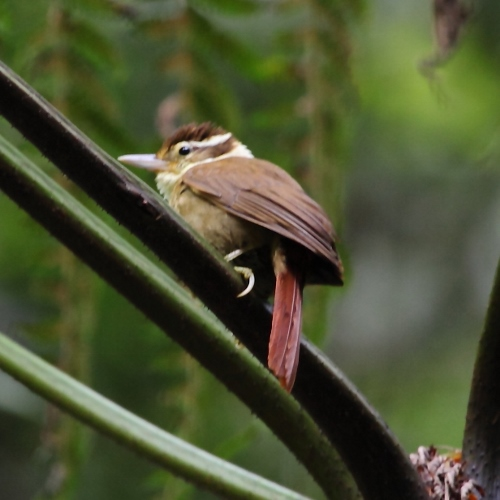
- at Intervales State Park, São Paulo State, Brazil

Conservation status
- Least Concern (IUCN 3.1)

Scientific classification
- Kingdom: Animalia
- Phylum: Chordata
- Class: Aves
- Order: Passeriformes
- Family: Furnariidae
- Genus: Anabazenops
- Species: A. fuscus

Binomial name
- Anabazenops fuscus (Vieillot, 1816)

= White-collared foliage-gleaner =

Species of bird

The white-collared foliage-gleaner (Anabazenops fuscus) is a species of bird in the Furnariinae subfamily of the ovenbird family Furnariidae. It is endemic to eastern Brazil.

== Taxonomy and systematics ==
The white-collared foliage-gleaner shares its genus with the bamboo foliage-gleaner (A. dorsalis). It is monotypic.

== Description ==
The white-collared foliage-gleaner is about 20 cm (7.9 in) long. It has a large wedge-shaped bill. The sexes' plumages are alike. Adults have a well-defined whitish supercilium, grayish white lores, and a white malar area on an otherwise dark brown face. Their crown is a rich dark brown with a faint scalloped appearance. Their throat is white and their entire neck is circled with a wide white band. Their back and rump are a lighter brown than the crown and their uppertail coverts and tail are dark rufous. Their wings are the same brown as the back with a bright yellowish brown bend. Their upper breast is grayish buff with a tawny tinge that becomes a darker tawny-brownish lower breast and belly. Their flanks and undertail coverts are darker and browner than the breast and belly. Their iris is dark brown or dark reddish brown, their maxilla dusky brown with a pale horn edge, their mandible pale horn or pale gray, and their legs and feet olive-gray, brownish gray, or dark olive-brown. Juveniles are similar to adults with a tawny-buff tinge to the supercilium and underparts.

== Distribution and habitat ==
The white-collared foliage-gleaner is found in southeastern Brazil from Bahia and Minas Gerais south into Santa Catarina. It inhabits montane evergreen forest, both primary and secondary, and is closely associated with large thickets of bamboo. In elevation it ranges between 350 and 1,200 m (1,100 and 3,900 ft).

== Behavior ==
=== Movement ===
The white-collared foliage-gleaner is a year-round resident throughout its range.

=== Feeding ===
The white-collared foliage-gleaner feeds on arthropods. It usually forages in pairs and will occasionally join mixed-species feeding flocks. It forages mostly in the forest's middle levels; it will forage in the understory but only rarely does so on the ground. It acrobatically climbs vertical stems and gleans and probes for prey on them and among green and dead leaves. Much of its feeding is on bamboo.

=== Breeding ===
The white-collared foliage-gleaner is assumed to be monogamous. It nests in a natural cavity in a branch. Nothing else is known about its breeding biology.

=== Vocalization ===
The white-collared foliage-gleaner's song has been described as a "high, musical, slightly lowered 'djepdjep---' " and as "low-pitched, evenly spaced 'tchook' notes...becoming louder after first few notes. It also makes a "distinctive high-pitched, squeaky 'chek, jééurr-jééurr-jééurr-jééurr-jééurr'...and [a] hoarse, syncopated 'wrr-jek, wrjejek, wrrjejek' ". Its alarm call is "a piercing 'ghéé-eh' ".

== Status ==
The IUCN originally assessed the white-collared foliage-gleaner as Near Threatened but since 2004 has classed it as being of Least Concern. It has a somewhat limited range and an unknown population size that is believed to be decreasing. No immediate threats have been identified. It is considered fairly common and occurs in several protected areas. However, "[e]xtensive deforestation within its relatively small range has dramatically reduced [the] area of available habitat".
