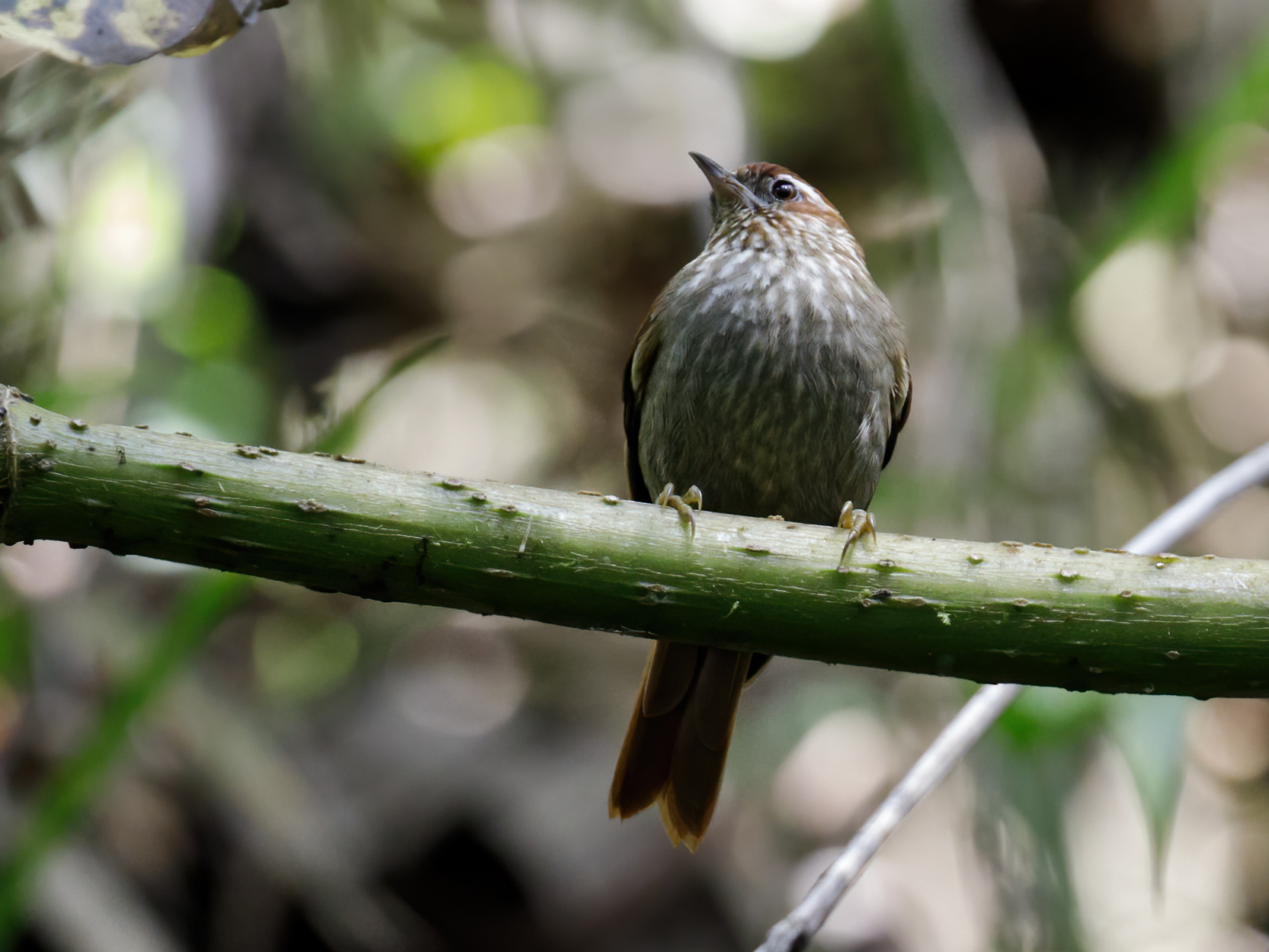

Conservation status
- Least Concern (IUCN 3.1)

Scientific classification
- Kingdom: Animalia
- Phylum: Chordata
- Class: Aves
- Order: Passeriformes
- Family: Furnariidae
- Genus: Siptornis; Reichenbach, 1853
- Species: S. striaticollis

Binomial name
- Siptornis striaticollis (Lafresnaye, 1843)

= Spectacled prickletail =

Species of bird

The spectacled prickletail (Siptornis striaticollis) is a species of bird in the Furnariinae subfamily of the ovenbird family Furnariidae. It is found in Colombia, Ecuador, and Peru.

== Taxonomy and systematics ==
The spectacled prickletail's taxonomy is unsettled. It has traditionally been thought most closely related to the greytails of genus Xenerpestes but there is some evidence that its closest relatives are genera Roraimia, Cranioleuca, and Thripophaga.

The spectacled prickletail is the only member of its genus. The International Ornithological Committee and BirdLife International's Handbook of the Birds of the World assign it two subspecies, the nominate S. s. striaticollis (Lafresnaye, 1843) and S. s. nortoni (Graves, GR & Robbins, MB, 1987). The Clements taxonomy treats it as monotypic. This article follows the two-subspecies model.

== Description ==
The spectacled prickletail is 11 to 12 cm (4.3 to 4.7 in) long and weighs 12 to 13 g (0.42 to 0.46 oz). It is a tiny furnariid that resembles a xenops. The sexes have the same plumage. Adults of the nominate subspecies have dull fuscous lores, a whitish supercilium and partial eyering, rufescent ear coverts with tawny streaks, and brown malars with pale buff streaks. Their crown is dark reddish brown with a hint of pale streaks. Their upperparts are rich rufescent brown that becomes redder to the chestnut-tinged uppertail coverts. Their tail is reddish chestnut; the central feathers lack barbs at the end giving a spiny appearance. Their wing coverts are dark chestnut and their primary coverts blackish brown. Their inner flight feathers are brown with rufescent edges and the outer ones mostly dark fuscous. The bend of the wing is pale cinnamon. Their chin is grizzled buff, their throat and upper breast grayish olive-brown with thin pale buff streaks and pale cinnamon on the edges, and the rest of their underparts grayish olive-brown. Their iris is brown, their maxilla dark brown, their mandible pinkish with a grayish tip, and their legs and feet grayish green to olive-yellow. Juveniles have a rufescent brown crown and more and wider streaks on the underparts than adults. Subspecies S. s. nortoni has paler lores than the nominate, with less white on the face and more obvious buff-whitish streaks on the throat and breast.

== Distribution and habitat ==
The spectacled prickletail is found locally in the Andes from southeastern Colombia south along the east slope in Ecuador and slightly into northern Peru. The nominate subspecies occurs in Colombia and S. s. nortoni in Ecuador and Peru. The species inhabits subtropical montane evergreen forest. In Colombia it ranges at elevations between 1,200 and 2,500 m (3,900 and 8,200 ft); in Ecuador it ranges between 1,300 and 2,300 m (4,300 and 7,500 ft).

== Behavior ==
=== Movement ===
The spectacled prickletail is a year-round resident throughout its range.

=== Feeding ===
The spectacled prickletail feeds on arthropods. It forages singly or in pairs, frequently in mixed-species feeding flocks, and usually in the forest's mid-storey or above. It feeds acrobatically, climbing and hitching along branches and hanging upside down as it probes moss, epiphytes, bark crevices, dead leaves, and the underside of large live leaves such as those of Cecropia.

=== Breeding ===
The spectacled prickletail is thought to be monogamous. Its nest is a ball of moss and other plant material with the entrance at the bottom, and suspended from near the end of a branch. Nothing else is known about its breeding biology.

=== Vocalization ===
What is thought to be the spectacled prickletail's song is a high-pitched trill.

== Status ==
The IUCN has assessed the spectacled prickletail as being of Least Concern. It has a limited range and an unknown population size but the latter is believed to be stable. No immediate threats have been identified. It is considered rare to uncommon and is found locally rather than continuously.
