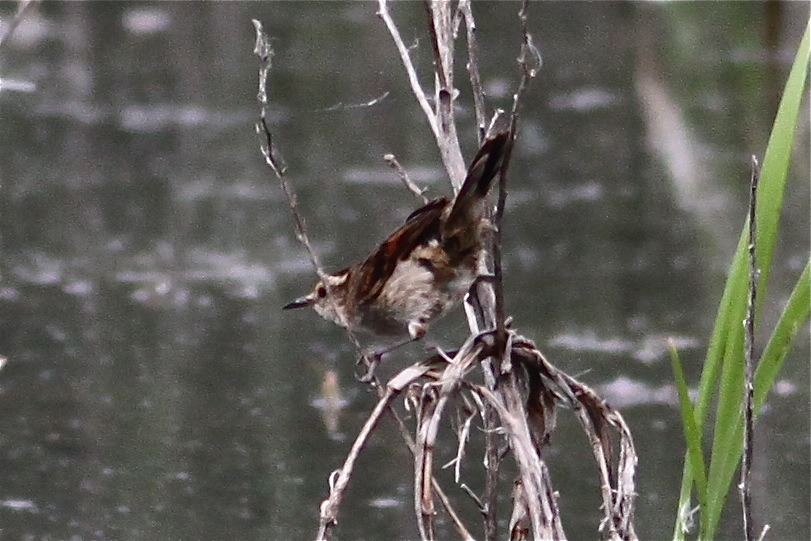

Conservation status
- Least Concern (IUCN 3.1)

Scientific classification
- Kingdom: Animalia
- Phylum: Chordata
- Class: Aves
- Order: Passeriformes
- Family: Furnariidae
- Genus: Phleocryptes; Cabanis & Heine, 1860
- Species: P. melanops

Binomial name
- Phleocryptes melanops (Vieillot, 1817)

= Wren-like rushbird =

Species of bird

The wren-like rushbird (Phleocryptes melanops) is a species of bird in the Furnariinae subfamily of the ovenbird family Furnariidae. It is found in Argentina, Bolivia, Brazil, Chile, Paraguay, Peru, and Uruguay.

== Taxonomy and systematics ==
The wren-like rushbird is the only member of its genus and has these four subspecies:

- P. m. brunnescens Zimmer, JT, 1935
- P. m. schoenobaenus Cabanis & Heine, 1860
- P. m. loaensis Philippi Bañados & Goodall, 1946
- P. m. melanops (Vieillot, 1817)

The wren-like rushbird is genetically most closely related to the curve-billed reedhaunter (Limnornis curvirostris).

== Description ==
The wren-like rushbird is 13 to 14 cm (5.1 to 5.5 in) long and weighs 11 to 16 g (0.39 to 0.56 oz). It is a small furnariid whose plumage closely resembles that of the wholly unrelated marsh wren (Cistothorus palustris). It has a longish slightly decurved bill. The sexes' plumages are essentially alike though females are slightly paler than males. Adults of the nominate subspecies P. m. melanops have a wide buff supercilium, grayish lores, a dark brown band behind the eye, mottled dark brown ear coverts, and a buff malar area. Their crown is blackish with wide brown streaks. They have a buff-brown collar with few streaks. Their back is blackish with rich brown streaks and obvious white feather shafts. Their rump and uppertail coverts are also rich brown, with some blackish inclusions in the latter. Their tail's innermost pair of feathers are rich brown and the rest blackish brown with buffy to tawny tips; the last few centimeters of the innermost two pairs have bare shafts. Their wing coverts and wings are blackish; the former have wide chestnut tips and the latter chestnut and rufous edges that together form a wide band on the closed wing. Their throat is white, their breast and belly buffy whitish, their sides and flanks dull brown, and their undertail coverts a mix of tawny-buff and white. Their iris is brown to dark brown, their bill blackish to dark horn whose mandible sometimes has a paler base, and their legs and feet grayish horn. Juveniles are similar to adults but with narrow dark edges on their underparts' feathers.

Subspecies P. m. schoenobaenus is significantly larger than the nominate and has a longer bill. It also has brighter upperparts and whiter underparts. P. m. brunnescens has a paler but more heavily streaked crown than the nominate. Its back is browner, its wingband paler, and its underparts paler and duller. P. m. loaensis is similar to brunnescens but has a somewhat darker and more chestnut wingband, and darker rump, sides, and flanks.

== Distribution and habitat ==
The subspecies of the wren-like rushbird are found thus:

- P. m. brunnescens: coastal western Peru between the Piura and Ica departments
- P. m. schoenobaenus: departments of Junín and Puno in central and southern Peru, departments of La Paz and Oruro in western Bolivia, and Jujuy Province in far northwestern Argentina
- P. m. loaensis: coastal in southern Peru's Department of Arequipa and northern Chile south to the Antofagasta Region
- P. m. melanops: from southern Brazil's Rio de Janeiro state south and west through Uruguay, central Chile, and most of Argentina; northern Argentina and Paraguay in the non-breeding season.

The wren-like rushbird inhabits freshwater and brackish marshes and the edges of lakes, all with emergent aquatic vegetation. It especially favors beds of Scirpus sedges. In elevation it ranges from sea level to 4,300 m (14,100 ft).

== Behavior ==
=== General ===
In addition to looking much like the marsh wren, the wren-like rushbird also behaves like one. In particular, both habitually perch in vegetation with each foot gripping a different stalk.

=== Movement ===
The wren-like rushbird is a partial migrant. Some part of the southern population, but apparently not all, moves north in the austral winter. Northern Argentina and Paraguay are occupied at that time.

=== Feeding ===
The wren-like rushbird feeds on arthropods. It forages by gleaning from floating or emergent vegetation and also from mud in the marsh.

=== Breeding ===
The wren-like rushbird breeds during the austral spring and summer, in general between September and January with some regional variation. It is thought to be monogamous. It weaves a ball-shaped nest of wet grass and other fibers cemented with mud and lines it with feathers and hair. The nest has a side entrance, usually with an overhanging "awning". It attaches the nest to several reeds or stems of a shrub, usually within 1 m (3 ft) above water. The clutch size is one to four eggs. In a limited number of studies, the incubation period was 16 to 18 days and fledging occurred about 16 days after hatch. The details of parental care are not known.

=== Vocalization ===
In much of its range, the wren-like rushbird's song is a "repeated mechanical ticking, repeated several times per second, sometimes for several minutes, often ending with trill like that of cicada". One author describes it as sounding "like an idling motor, with the throttle occasionally opened". The song of the Andean population is "similar but with more strident tones". The species' calls include "buzzy 'zzt', nasal 'ik' or 'eh', and various squeaky notes".

== Status ==
The IUCN has assessed the wren-like rushbird as being of Least Concern. It has a very large range, but its population size is not known and is believed to be decreasing. No immediate threats have been identified. It is thought to be generally common in appropriate habitat. However, its "[d]ependence on wetlands with emergent vegetation renders it somewhat vulnerable; many local populations [have been] greatly reduced or extirpated by habitat destruction. [The] Andean and coastal Pacific races [are] particularly vulnerable.
