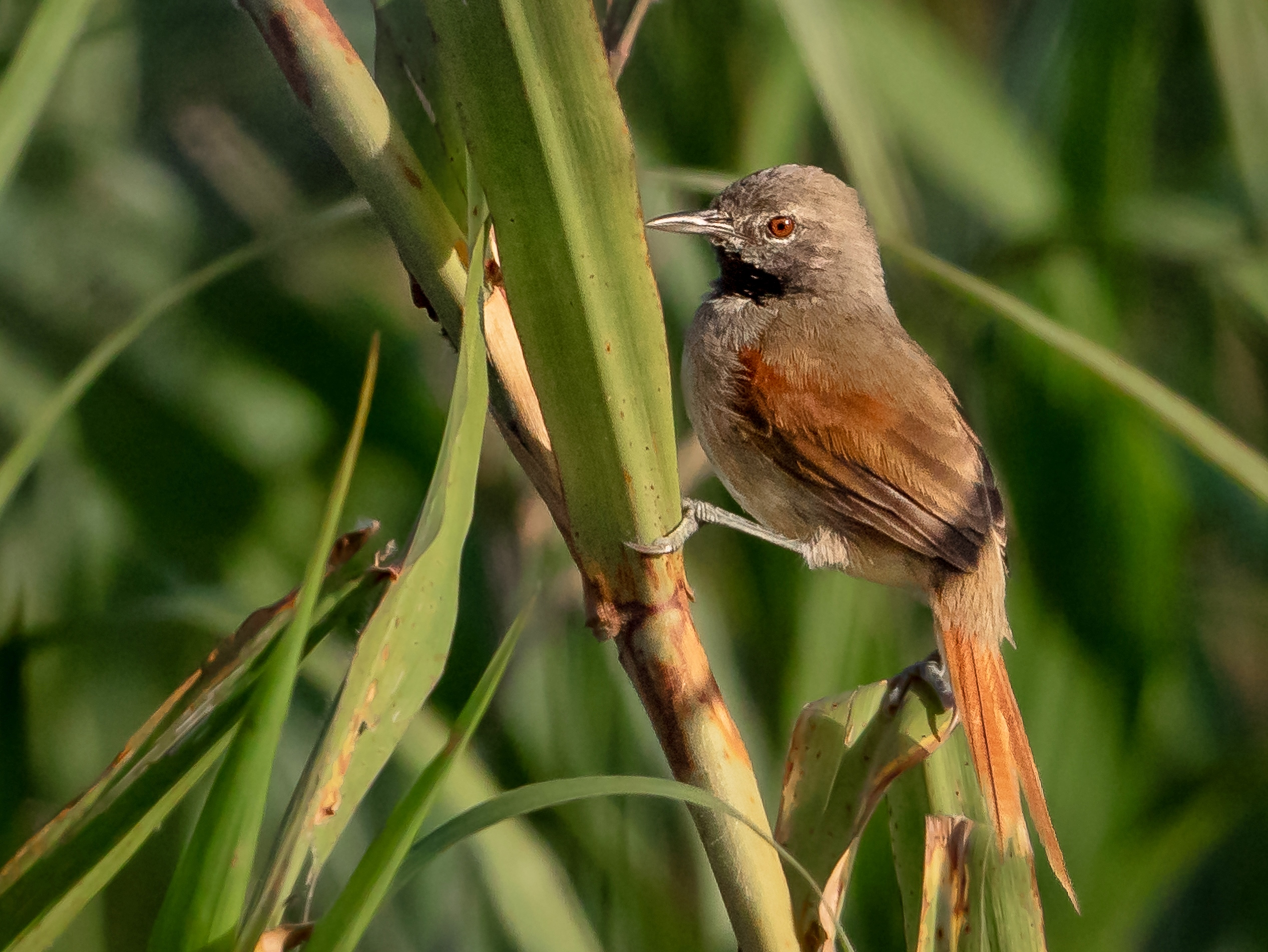

Conservation status
- Least Concern (IUCN 3.1)

Scientific classification
- Kingdom: Animalia
- Phylum: Chordata
- Class: Aves
- Order: Passeriformes
- Family: Furnariidae
- Genus: Mazaria; Claramunt, 2014
- Species: M. propinqua

Binomial name
- Mazaria propinqua (Pelzeln, 1859)

Synonyms
- Synallaxis propinqua

= White-bellied spinetail =

Species of bird

The white-bellied spinetail (Mazaria propinqua) is a species of bird in the Furnariinae subfamily of the ovenbird family Furnariidae. It is found in Bolivia, Brazil, Colombia, Ecuador, French Guiana, and Peru.

== Taxonomy and systematics ==
The white-bellied spinetail was originally described in genus Synallaxis. Much later, molecular phylogenetic studies found that it is not closely related to the other members of the genus and it was moved to its own genus Mazaria. It and the chotoy spinetail (Schoeniophylax phryganophilus) are sister species.

The white-bellied spinetail is monotypic: No subspecies are recognized.

== Description ==
The white-bellied spinetail is 14.5 to 16 cm (5.7 to 6.3 in) long and weighs 16 to 22 g (0.56 to 0.78 oz). The sexes have the same plumage. Adults have gray lores on an otherwise grayish brown face. Their crown, back, rump, and uppertail coverts are also grayish brown. Their flight feathers are mostly dusky with pale rufous edges on the primaries. Their tail is dull rufous; the feathers are pointed. Their chin and upper throat are white or black with white fringes on the feathers. Their lower throat is black with white on the feather tips. Their breast is gray or pale brownish gray, their belly white, and their flanks pale brown. Their iris is brown, their maxilla black, their mandible gray or pale gray, and their legs and feet olive or olive gray. Juveniles have whiter underparts than adults, with no black on their throat and tawny rather than rufous wings.

== Distribution and habitat ==
The white-bellied spinetail is found along rivers in the western Amazon Basin of extreme southeastern Colombia, eastern Ecuador, northeastern and east-central Peru, northern Bolivia, southern French Guiana, and western Brazil. (It is known in French Guiana from a single specimen.) The South American Classification Committee of the American Ornithological Society calls the species hypothetical in Colombia. Major rivers in addition to the upper Amazon itself are the Napo, Pastaza, Ucayali, Madre de Díos, Jurua, and Tocantins. The white-bellied spinetail inhabits early successional growth on river islands, where it favors grassy areas with scattered bushes and small trees. It is a bird of the lowlands, reaching only 200 m (700 ft) in Colombia and Bolivia and 300 m (1,000 ft) in Ecuador.

== Behavior ==
=== Movement ===
The white-bellied spinetail appears to be resident on river islands year-round. Despite that some islands flood during the rainy season, the species has never been documented on the "mainland".

=== Feeding ===
The white-bellied spinetail is insectivorous but its diet has not been examined in detail. It typically forages singly or in pairs, gleaning prey from grasses, small branches, and foliage within about 2 m (7 ft) of the ground. It has also been observed making short sally flights.

=== Breeding ===
Nothing is known about the white-bellied spinetail's breeding biology.

=== Vocalization ===
The white-bellied spinetail's song is "a strange, low-pitched, and nasal churring, ch-r-r-r-r-r-r-r-r" that is also described as "a harsh, grating chatter: djr djr-djr'djr'djr'djr'djr'djr'djr'djr'djr-djr". Other vocalizations include "a slower and scratchy krreenh-krreenh-hre-kre-kre-kre-kre" and "a low, drawn out, raspy snarl rrhhhhh; a dry, scratchy gri-grrreh; and a longer, descending series of growls: ri-gri-gri-gri-grreh.

== Status ==
The IUCN has assessed the white-bellied spinetail as being of Least Concern. It has a large range and an unknown population size that is believed to be stable. No immediate threats have been identified. It is considered uncommon to locally fairly common. "Human activity has little short-term direct effect on White-bellied Spinetail, other than the local effects of habitat destruction. In the longer term, White-bellied Spinetail potentially is vulnerable to widespread habitat loss, as might occur through perturbations of the Amazonian hydrological regime stemming from widespread deforestation, dam construction, or global climate change."
