= Pseudoseisuropsis =

Pseudoseisuropsis Temporal range: Pleistocene

Scientific classification
- Kingdom: Animalia
- Phylum: Chordata
- Class: Aves
- Order: Passeriformes
- Family: Furnariidae
- Genus: †Pseudoseisuropsis; Noriega, 1991

Species
- Pseudoseisuropsis nehuen (type); Pseudoseisuropsis cuelloi Pseudoseisuropsis wintu

Genus of birds

Pseudoseisuropsis is a genus of extinct birds in the ovenbird family from the Pleistocene of Argentina and Uruguay. The genus was described in 1991 based on disarticulated skeletal elements and a nearly-complete skull. Although originally believed to be closely related to the extant genus Pseudoseisura, phylogenetic analyses suggested a more basal origin within the family.

== Species ==
- Pseudoseisuropsis nehuen Noriega, 1991
- Pseudoseisuropsis cuelloi Claramunt & Rinderknecht, 2005
- Pseudoseisuropsis wintu Stefanini et al., 2016
