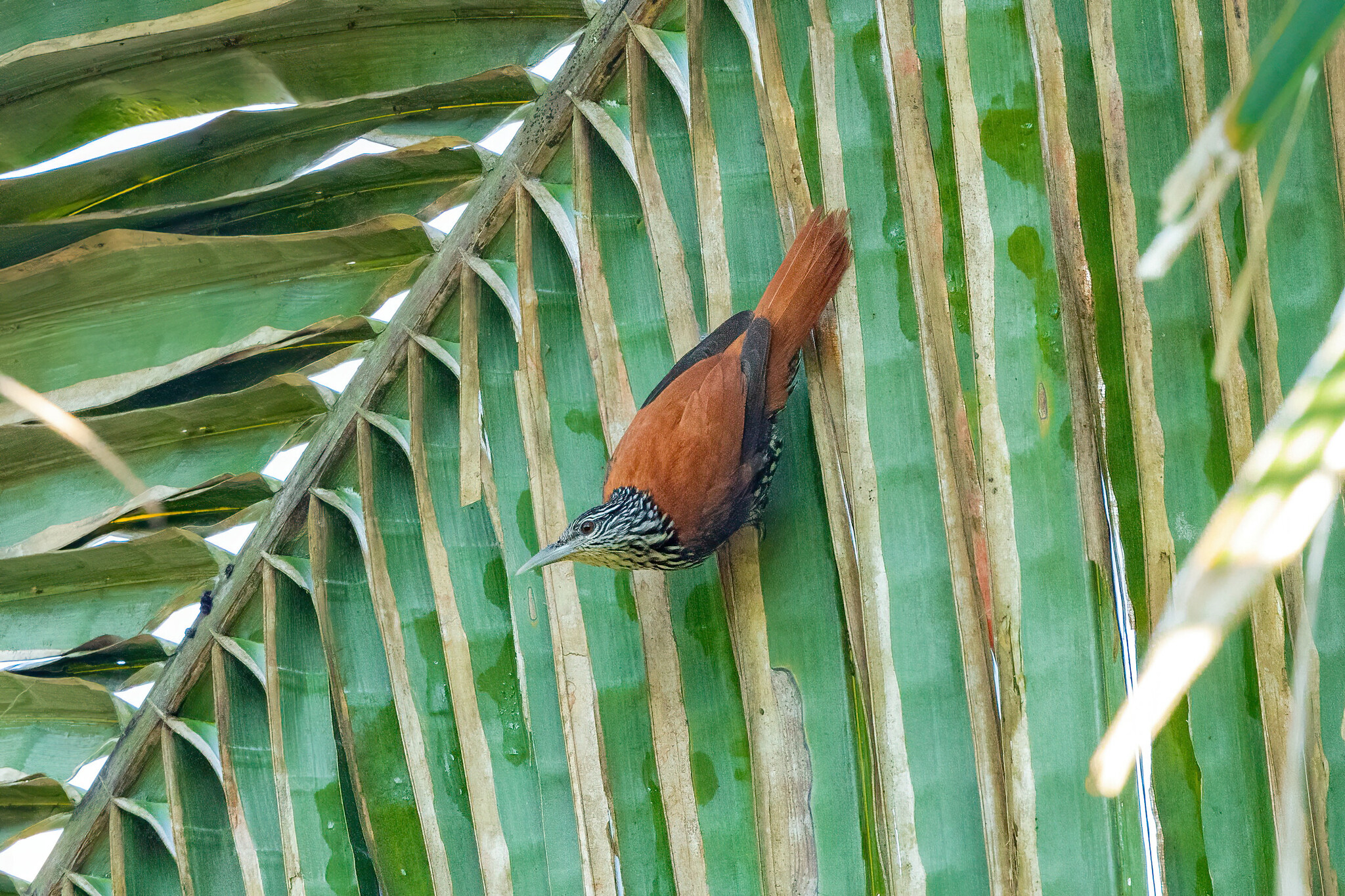

Conservation status
- Least Concern (IUCN 3.1)

Scientific classification
- Kingdom: Animalia
- Phylum: Chordata
- Class: Aves
- Order: Passeriformes
- Family: Furnariidae
- Genus: Berlepschia; Ridgway, 1887
- Species: B. rikeri

Binomial name
- Berlepschia rikeri (Ridgway, 1887)
- The range on this map is incomplete; it does not extend far enough west. See that in xeno-canto .

= Point-tailed palmcreeper =

Species of bird

The point-tailed palmcreeper or simply palmcreeper (Berlepschia rikeri) is a species of bird in the Furnariinae subfamily of the ovenbird family Furnariidae. It is found in Bolivia, Brazil, Colombia, Ecuador, French Guiana, Guyana, Peru, Suriname, and Venezuela.

== Taxonomy and systematics ==
The point-tailed palmcreeper is the only member of its genus and has no subspecies.

Robert Ridgway initially placed it in genus Picolaptes and later created its current genus. With it Ridgway honors the ornithologist Hans von Berlepsch, who pointed out to him the significant differences of the species with the others of genus Picolaptes. The specific epithet rikeri honors C.B. Riker, who collected the type specimen that Ridgway used to describe the species.

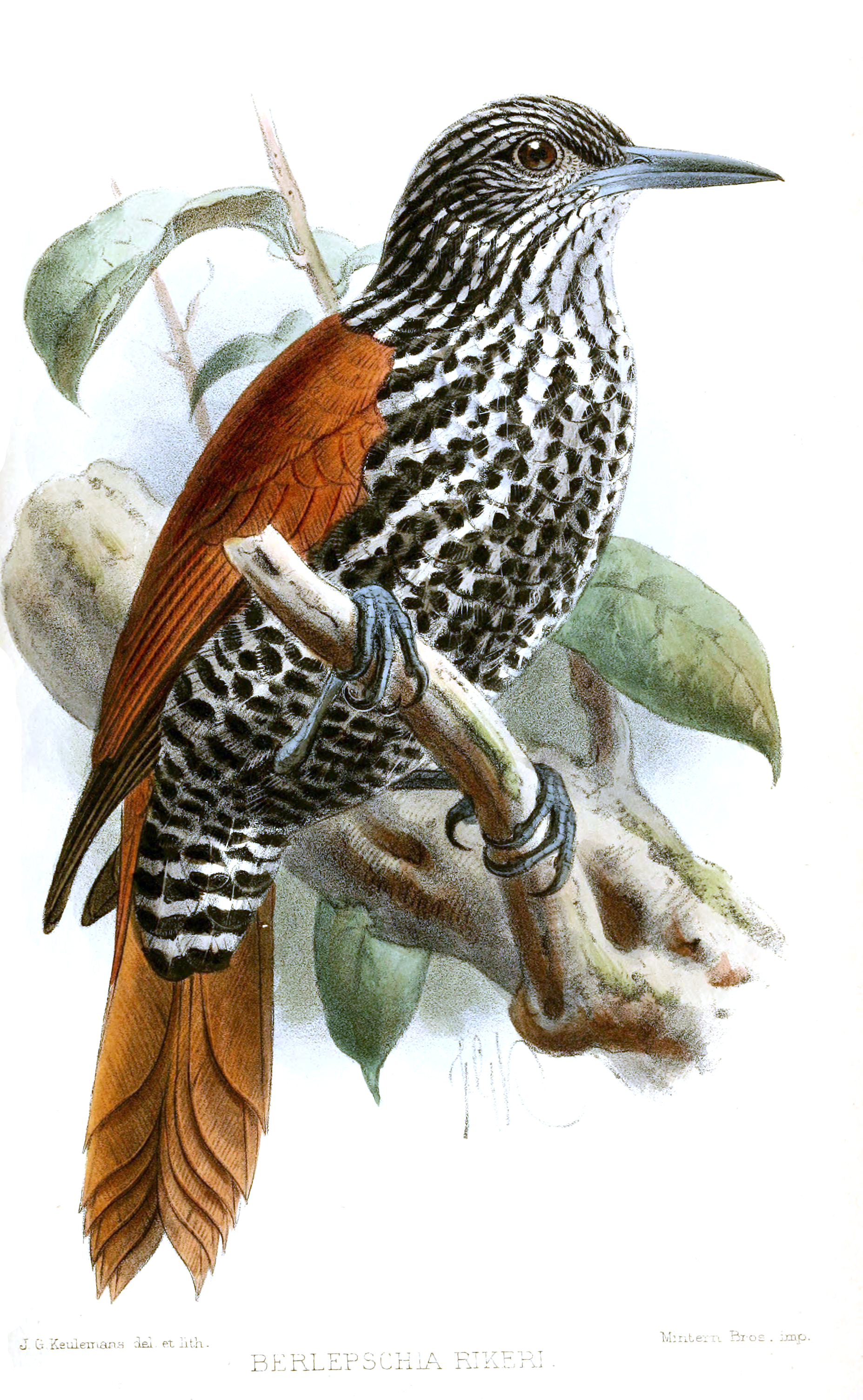
Berlepschia rikeri Keulemans 1889

== Description ==
Ridway says of the point-tailed palmcreeper, "This handsome species, of very striking appearance, is entirely different in coloration from any Dendrocolaptine bird with which I am acquainted".

The point-tailed palmcreeper is 18 to 22 cm (7.1 to 8.7 in) long and weighs 32 to 37 g (1.1 to 1.3 oz). The sexes are alike. Adults have a face with thin black and white streaks. Its crown and upper back are also streaked black and white; the streaks become "teardrops" on the back. Its lower back, rump, and uppertail coverts are bright chestnut. Its tail is also bright chestnut; its pointed feathers have stiffened bases. Its wing coverts are chestnut and its flight feathers are blackish fuscous; the secondaries have rufous edges. Its throat is white with long black streaks. Its breast has wide black and white streaks that fade and lose crispness on the belly. Its undertail coverts are barred black and white. Its iris is orange-brown, its maxilla gray to dark gray, its mandible gray to light gray, and its legs and feet gray to dark gray. Juveniles have only small black dots on the white throat and their breast is spotted instead of streaked.

== Distribution and habitat ==
The point-tailed palmcreeper is found from southern Venezuela east through the Guianas into northeastern Brazil; south through southeastern Colombia, eastern Ecuador, and eastern Peru into northern Bolivia; and across Amazonian Brazil to the Atlantic and as far south as Mato Grosso and Goiás states. It primarily inhabits Mauritia palm swamps and forest, and occasionally areas of other palms. The swamps may be in evergreen forest or savanna. In elevation it occurs below 400 m (1,300 ft) in most of its range. It does reach 650 m (2,100 ft) in Ecuador.

== Behavior ==
=== Movement ===
The point-tailed palmcreeper is a year-round resident throughout its range.

=== Feeding ===
The point-tailed palmcreeper's diet is arthropods; members of Coleoptera, Hemiptera, Formicidae, and Araneae have been documented as prey. It almost always forages in pairs. It is acrobatic as it gleans from palm branches and fronds, especially at their bases; it uses its tail as a brace and often hangs upside down.

=== Breeding ===
The point-tailed palmcreeper is thought to be monogamous. Its breeding season has not been defined but appears to span July to November in parts of Brazil. One nest was constructed of sticks within dead fronds of a Mauritia palm. The clutch size, incubation period, time to fledging, and details of parental care are not known.

=== Vocalization ===
The point-tailed palmcreepers song is "a loud series of 20–30 staccato, strident notes, on same pitch or ascending slightly and then descending at end". It has been put into words as "ka-koo, didididididididididi", "dedede-kee!-kee!-kee!-kee!-kee!-kee!-kee!-kee!", and "weet-weet-witwitwit---".

== Status ==
The IUCN has assessed the point-tailed palmcreeper as being of Least concern. It has a very large range, and though its population size is not known it is believed to be stable. No immediate threats have been identified. It is considered rare to uncommon. "Although [its] global population [is] certainly small, because of [the species'] restriction to palm swamps, this habitat is relatively immune to most anthropogenic disturbance." It occurs in several protected areas.
