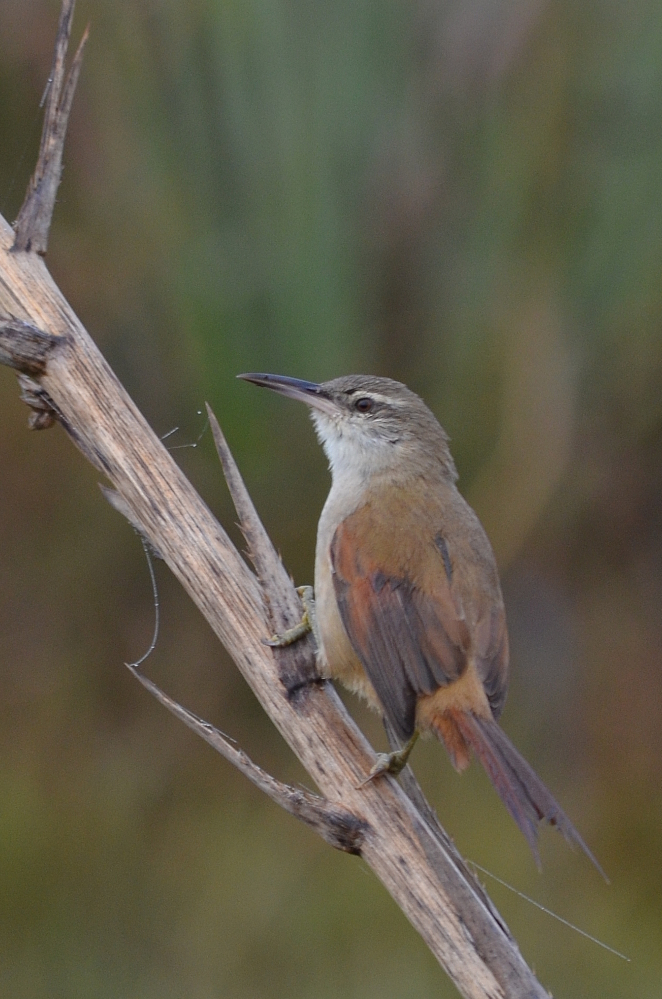
- Straight-billed reedhaunter, Limnoctites rectirostris

Scientific classification
- Kingdom: Animalia
- Phylum: Chordata
- Class: Aves
- Order: Passeriformes
- Family: Furnariidae
- Genus: Limnoctites; Hellmayr, 1925

Type species
- Limnornis rectirostris Gould, 1839

Species
- Limnoctites rectirostris Limnoctites sulphuriferus

= Limnoctites =

Genus of birds

Limnoctites is the genus of reedhaunters, birds in the family Furnariidae. It contains the following species:

- Straight-billed reedhaunter, Limnoctites rectirostris
- Sulphur-bearded reedhaunter, Limnoctites sulphuriferus
