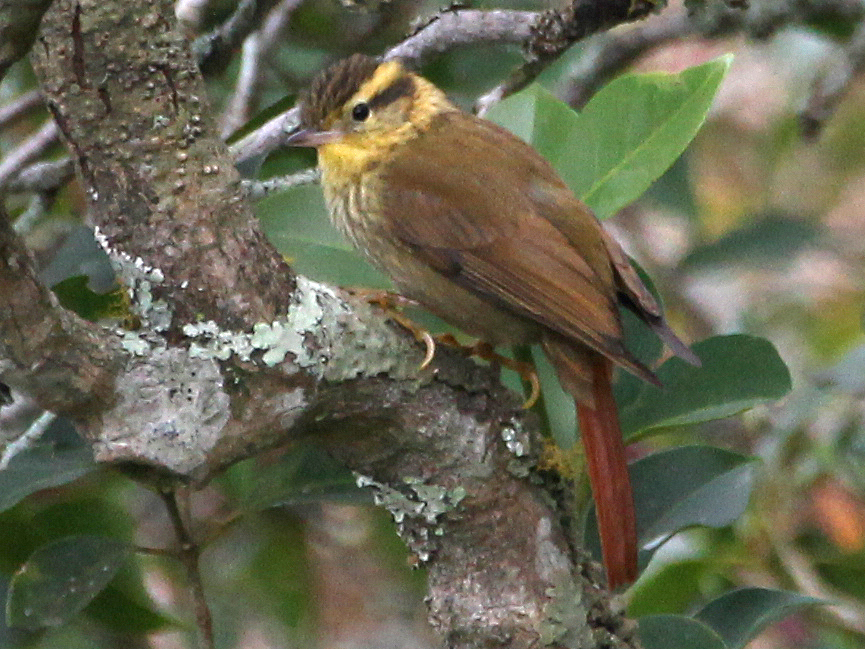
- Subspecies camargoi

Conservation status
- Least Concern (IUCN 3.1)

Scientific classification
- Kingdom: Animalia
- Phylum: Chordata
- Class: Aves
- Order: Passeriformes
- Family: Furnariidae
- Genus: Heliobletus; Reichenbach, 1853
- Species: H. contaminatus

Binomial name
- Heliobletus contaminatus Berlepsch, 1885

= Sharp-billed treehunter =

Species of bird

The sharp-billed treehunter (Heliobletus contaminatus), sometimes called the sharp-billed xenops, is a species of bird in the Furnariinae subfamily of the ovenbird family Furnariidae. It is found in Argentina, Brazil, Paraguay, and Uruguay.

== Taxonomy and systematics ==
The sharp-billed treehunter is assigned two subspecies, the nominate H. c. contaminatus (Berlepsch, 1885) and (as of 2023) H. c. camargoi (Cardoso da Silva & Stotz, 1992). However, there is some confusion about the subspecific epithets of the subspecies, and one or both might be changed. In recognition of that possibility, BirdLife International's Handbook of the Birds of the World gives H. c. camargoi the trinomial "Heliobletus contaminatus [new name]".

One author included genus Heliobletus within Xenops, as the sharp-billed treehunter's plumage is very similar to those of some Xenops species. Genetic data refute this treatment and find that it belongs in Heliobletus and is sister to genus Philydor.

The sharp-billed treehunter is the only member of genus Heliobletus. However, one author states that "[a]n undescribed ''Heliobletus sp. occurs in SE Bahia [Brazil]". Recordings of this undescribed taxon have been made, and it has been found in the Serra do Lontras.

== Description ==
The sharp-billed treehunter is 12 to 13 cm (4.7 to 5.1 in) long and weighs 13 to 15 g (0.46 to 0.53 oz). It has a short, pointed, and slightly downturned bill, and male and female plumages are alike. Adults of the nominate subspecies have a wide golden-buff supercilium, a blackish brown band behind the eye, dark brownish and ochraceous lores, and dull buff ear coverts. Their crown is blackish brown with wide golden-olive streaks. They have a buff partial collar. Their back, rump, and uppertail coverts are dull olive-brown with rufous tips on the coverts. Their tail is dark rufous and the very end of the feathers have no barbs. Their wings are olive-brown with darker primary coverts. Their throat is pale yellowish buff, their breast a paler yellowish buff with dull olive-brown streaks, their belly plain dull olive-brown, and their undertail coverts dull brownish with very wide rufous streaks. Their iris is dark brown, their maxilla brown to black, their mandible pinkish gray, and their legs and feet greenish gray to dull yellow-green. Juveniles are much like adults but with a more ochraceous supercilium and streaks; the streaks are less distinct. Subspecies H. c. camargoi has wide pale golden-buff streaks on its back, and more and wider streaks on the breast and belly.

== Distribution and habitat ==
The nominate subspecies of the sharp-billed treehunter is found in southeastern Brazil from Minas Gerais and Espírito Santo south to São Paulo and Rio de Janeiro states. H. c. camargoi is found from São Paulo south through Rio Grande do Sul and eastern Paraguay into northeastern Argentina's Misiones Province and extreme northeastern Uruguay. The species inhabits humid lowland and montane evergreen forest. In elevation it ranges from sea level to 1,830 m (6,000 ft). The nominate subspecies tends to be more numerous at the higher elevations.

== Behavior ==
=== Movement ===
The sharp-billed treehunter is a year-round resident throughout its range.

=== Feeding ===
The sharp-billed treehunter feeds on arthropods. It forages singly and in pairs, usually as members of a mixed-species feeding flock. It feeds primarily from the forest's mid-storey to its canopy, though it will feed in the understory. It climbs and hangs acrobatically, gleaning, pulling, and pecking for its prey on branches, foliage, and epiphytes.

=== Breeding ===
Nothing is known about the sharp-billed treehunter's breeding biology.

=== Vocalization ===
The sharp-billed treehunter's song is "a short, harsh, metallic slow trill on one pitch, sometimes interspersed with squeaky notes or tinkling overtones". Its call is a soft "tick".

== Status ==
The IUCN has assessed the sharp-billed treehunter as being of Least Concern. It has a large range but its population size is not known and is believed to be decreasing. No immediate threats have been identified. It is considered uncommon to locally fairly common in most of its range but rare in Paraguay. It occurs in several protected areas. However, "[e]xtensive deforestation within its relatively small range has dramatically reduced [the] area of available habitat".
