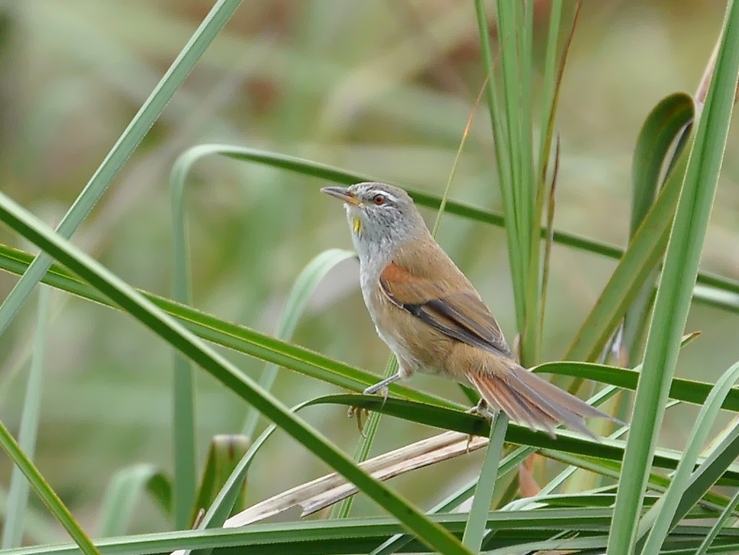

Conservation status
- Least Concern (IUCN 3.1)

Scientific classification
- Kingdom: Animalia
- Phylum: Chordata
- Class: Aves
- Order: Passeriformes
- Family: Furnariidae
- Genus: Limnoctites
- Species: L. sulphuriferus

Binomial name
- Limnoctites sulphuriferus (Burmeister, 1869)

Synonyms
- Cranioleuca sulphurifera

= Sulphur-bearded reedhaunter =

Species of bird

The sulphur-bearded reedhaunter or sulphur-throated spinetail (Limnoctites sulphuriferus) is a species of bird in the Furnariinae subfamily of the ovenbird family Furnariidae. It is found in Argentina, Brazil, and Uruguay.

== Taxonomy and systematics ==
The sulphur-bearded reedhaunter was long placed in genus Cranioleuca, and for a time by itself in genus Limnornis, but a study published in 2011 placed it in genus Limnoctites. There it joined its sister species the straight-billed reedhaunter (L. rectirostris). The South American Classification Committee of the American Ornithological Society, the International Ornithological Committee, and the Clements taxonomy adopted the new genus starting in about 2019. However, as of November 2023 BirdLife International's Handbook of the Birds of the World retains it as Cranioleuca sulphurifera with the English name sulphur-throated spinetail.

The sulphur-bearded reedhaunter is monotypic.

== Description ==
The sulphur-bearded reedhaunter is 15 to 16 cm (5.9 to 6.3 in) long and weighs 12 to 14 g (0.42 to 0.49 oz). The sexes have the same plumage. Adults have a buffish white supercilium on an otherwise grayish-streaked whitish face. Their crown, back, rump, and uppertail coverts are olive-brown. Their tail feathers are sharply pointed; the central pair are brownish and longer than the others, which are more rufous. Their greater and median wing coverts are rufous, the primary coverts and secondaries dark fuscous, and the primaries rufous with rich tawny bases. Their chin and center of their throat are yellow, their breast whitish with thin grayish streaks, their belly whitish, and their flanks and undertail coverts tawny-buff. Their iris is whitish red to orange-pink, their maxilla blackish brown to black, their mandible pinkish white to whitish, and their legs and feet greenish gray to pale olive-green. Juveniles have darker upperparts and more ochraceous underparts than adults, with no yellow on the chin and no streaks on the breast.

== Distribution and habitat ==
The sulphur-bearded reedhaunter is found from far southern Brazil's Rio Grande do Sul south through Uruguay into eastern Argentina as far south as northern Río Negro Province, but passing south of far northeastern Misiones Province. It inhabits freshwater marshes with tall grasses or reeds and adjacent scrublands. In elevation it ranges from near sea level to 300 m (1,000 ft).

== Behavior ==
=== Movement ===
The sulphur-bearded reedhaunter is a year-round resident throughout its range.

=== Feeding ===
The sulphur-bearded reedhaunter's diet is not known but is probably mostly arthropods. It forages mostly singly or in pairs. Nothing else is known about the species' prey or feeding behavior.

=== Breeding ===
The sulphur-bearded reedhaunter breeds during the austral spring and summer. It is thought to be monogamous. Its nest is an oval ball of reed fragments and other plant fibers lined with grasses and feathers. It is attached to reed stems, usually not far above water but sometimes above mud or drier ground. The clutch size ranges from two to four and is usually three. The incubation period, time to fledging, and details of parental care are not known.

=== Vocalization ===
The sulphur-bearded reedhaunter's song is "a slightly rising trill c. 2·5–3·5 seconds long, followed by rapid series of harsh notes that fade towards end, 'd-d-d-r-r-i-i-, dirip, dirip, dirip, drip-drip-dreeuw-dreeuw', sometimes followed by upslurred trill". Members of a pair often sing in duet.

== Status ==
The IUCN has assessed the sulphur-bearded reedhaunter as being of Least Concern. It has a large range and an unknown population size that is believed to be decreasing. No immediate threats have been identified. It is considered uncommon to locally fairly common but rare in the southern part of its range. It occurs in two protected areas in Argentina. Its "[r]estriction to wetlands makes it susceptible to the usual suite of conservation problems that afflict wetland species".
