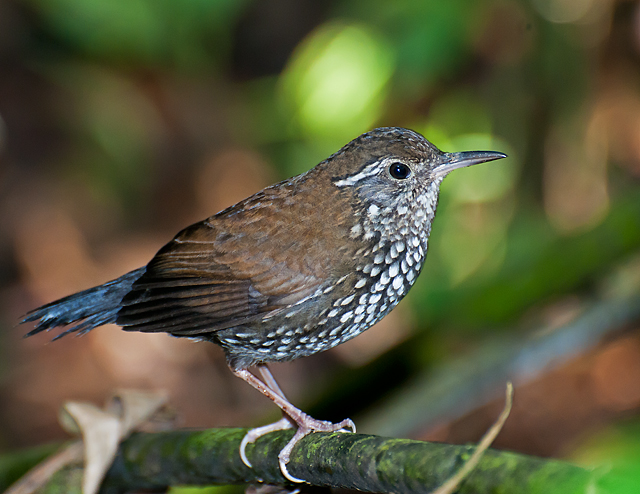
- In São Paulo, Brazil

Conservation status
- Least Concern (IUCN 3.1)

Scientific classification
- Kingdom: Animalia
- Phylum: Chordata
- Class: Aves
- Order: Passeriformes
- Family: Furnariidae
- Genus: Lochmias; Swainson, 1827
- Species: L. nematura

Binomial name
- Lochmias nematura (Lichtenstein, MHC, 1823)

Subspecies
- See text

= Sharp-tailed streamcreeper =

Species of bird

The sharp-tailed streamcreeper (Lochmias nematura) is a passerine bird of South America in the Furnariinae subfamily of the ovenbird family Furnariidae. Alternate names include streamside Lochmias, sharp-tailed creeper, and simply streamcreeper. It is found in Panama and every mainland South American country except Chile, French Guiana, and Suriname.

== Taxonomy and systematics ==
The sharp-tailed streamcreeper is the only member of its genus and has these six subspecies:

- L. n. nelsoni Aldrich, 1945
- L. n. chimantae Phelps, WH & Phelps, WH Jr, 1947
- L. n. castanonotus Chubb, C, 1918
- L. n. sororius Cabanis, 1873
- L. n. obscuratus Sclater, PL & Salvin, 1873
- L. n. nematura (Lichtenstein, MHC, 1823)

Subspecies L. n. obscuratus might be a separate species, but this idea is complicated by L. n. sororius, whose characteristics are intermediate between obscuratus and the nominate subspecies L. n. nematura.

== Description ==
The sharp-tailed streamcreeper is 13 to 14 cm (5.1 to 5.5 in) long and weighs 20 to 38 g (0.71 to 1.3 oz). It is a rather dark furnariid with a long and slightly decurved bill. The sexes' plumages are alike. Adults of the nominate subspecies have a narrow ragged white supercilium, blackish lores, dull brownish ear coverts with rufescent shafts, and a whitish malar area. Their crown is dark brown with faint spots on the forehead. Their back is rich reddish brown that blends to a blackish rump and uppertail coverts. Their tail is sooty blackish and has a "spiny" appearance because the feather tips have bare shafts. Their wings are a similar reddish brown to the back. Their chin is whitish, their throat feathers whitish with dark brown tips, their breast dull dark brown heavily spotted white, and their belly colored like the breast but with white streaks. Their undertail coverts are blackish brown with pale shafts. Their iris is dark brown to brown, their maxilla black to brownish, their mandible black to grayish horn, and their legs and feet highly variable from dull pink to dark brown. Juveniles are similar to adults but with less well defined, somewhat buffy, spots on their underparts.

The other subspecies of the sharp-tailed streamcreeper differ from the nominate and each other thus:

- L. n. obscuratus, little or no supercilium, duller brown less reddish back, throat and breast darker with oblong or diamond-shaped spots, belly and flanks darker and unspotted
- L. n. sororius, back and rump color more reddish than obscuratus' but less than nominate's, underparts' pattern also intermediate between them
- L. n. nelsoni, darker less rufescent upperparts and more grayish underparts with less spotting than nominate
- L. n. chimantae, much like nominate with darker, more brownish back
- L. n. castanonotus, chestnut-brown upperparts, less spotting and streaking on underparts than nominate

== Distribution and habitat ==
The sharp-tailed streamcreeper has several widely separated ranges. The subspecies are found thus:

- L. n. nelsoni: individual mountains in far eastern Panama's Darién Province
- L. n. chimantae: tepui region of Venezuela's Amazonas and Bolívar states
- L. n. castanonotus: southeastern Venezuela and adjoining western Guyana
- L. n. sororius: Venezuelan Coastal Range; all three Andean branches in Colombia south in the Andes through Ecuador into Peru as far as Department of San Martín
- L. n. obscuratus: Andes from Peru's Department of Huánuco south through Bolivia into northwestern Argentina's Jujuy and Salta provinces
- L. n. nematura: Brazil from Mato Grosso to Bahia and south through eastern Paraguay into northeastern Argentina to Entre Ríos Province and much of Uruguay

The sharp-tailed streamcreeper was first seen in Guyana in 2002 and a specimen was collected there in 2004. It is not positively known which of the Venezuelan subspecies the Guyanese records belong to, though they are attributed to L. n. castanonotus.

The sharp-tailed streamcreeper is always found near streams and small rivers with dense undergrowth. In the mountains of Panama and Venezuela and south through the Andes it inhabits montane evergreen forest at elevations between 700 and 2,800 m (2,300 and 9,200 ft). In its southeastern range it inhabits lowland evergreen forest and mature secondary forest.

== Behavior ==
=== Movement ===
The sharp-tailed streamcreeper is a year-round resident throughout its range.

=== Feeding ===
The sharp-tailed streamcreeper's diet includes a wide variety of arthropods and also tadpoles; there is a record of one eating an adult frog. It forages singly or in pairs, walking and hopping on the ground, among leaf litter and moss on rocks, and shallow streambeds to glean, probe, and toss aside leaves for prey.

=== Breeding ===
The sharp-tailed streamcreeper's breeding season has not been fully defined. In Venezuela it nests during the wet season; in southeastern Brazil the nesting season includes September. The species is believed to be monogamous. Its nest is a ball of roots and twigs with a lining of leaves constructed in a chamber at the end of a tunnel in an earthen bank. The clutch size is two eggs. The incubation period, time to fledging, and details of parental care are not known.

=== Vocalization ===
The sharp-tailed streamcreeper's song appears to vary little among its disjunct populations. The song is "a series of dry notes that gradually accelerate and ascend, then stay on same pitch, then descend abruptly". Its calls have been written as "sea-sick", "seesee-sik", "tsiterit", and "tsitit". Its alarm call is "chet-chet-chet".

== Status ==
The IUCN has assessed the sharp-tailed streamcreeper as being of Least Concern. It has a very large range and an estimated population of at least 500,000 mature individuals. The population, however, is believed to be decreasing. No immediate threats have been identified. It is found locally in Panama. It is considered rare to uncommon in the Andes (though locally common in southern Bolivia) and uncommon to locally fairly common in the southeast. It occurs in several protected areas.
