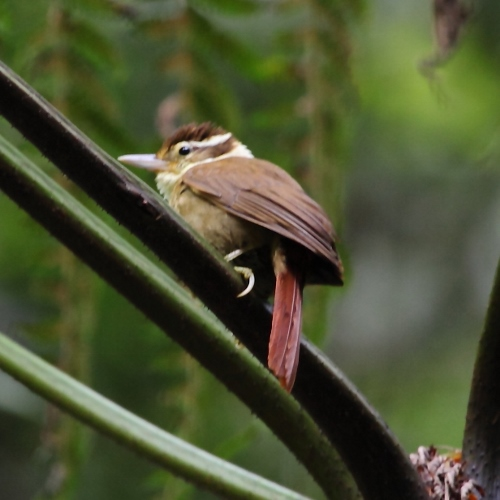
- White-collared foliage-gleaner (Anabazenops fuscus)

Scientific classification
- Kingdom: Animalia
- Phylum: Chordata
- Class: Aves
- Order: Passeriformes
- Family: Furnariidae
- Genus: Anabazenops; Lafresnaye, 1841

Type species
- Sitta fusca Vieillot, 1816

Species
- 2, see text

= Anabazenops =

Genus of birds

Anabazenops is a genus of birds in the family Furnariidae.

It contains the following species:

Image	Scientific name	Common name	Distribution
	Anabazenops dorsalis	Bamboo foliage-gleaner or crested foliage-gleaner	Bolivia, Brazil, Colombia, Ecuador, and Peru.
	Anabazenops fuscus	White-collared foliage-gleaner	eastern Brazil.
