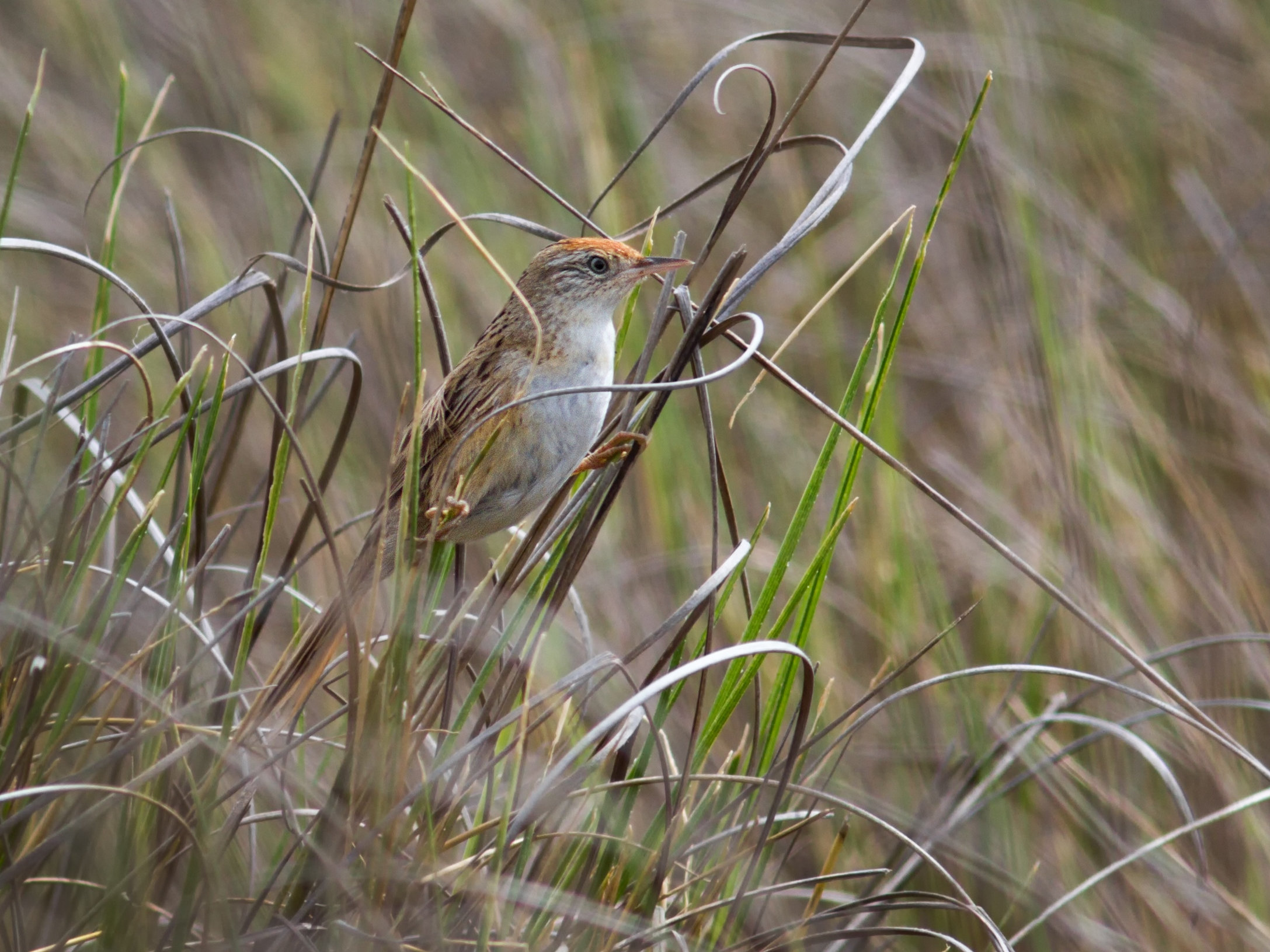

Conservation status
- Least Concern (IUCN 3.1)

Scientific classification
- Kingdom: Animalia
- Phylum: Chordata
- Class: Aves
- Order: Passeriformes
- Family: Furnariidae
- Genus: Spartonoica; J.L. Peters, 1950
- Species: S. maluroides

Binomial name
- Spartonoica maluroides (D'Orbigny & Lafresnaye, 1837)

= Bay-capped wren-spinetail =

Species of bird

The bay-capped wren-spinetail (Spartonoica maluroides) is a species of bird in the Furnariinae subfamily of the ovenbird family Furnariidae. It is found in Argentina, Brazil, Paraguay, and Uruguay.

== Taxonomy and systematics ==
The bay-capped wren-spinetail is the only member of genus Spartonoica and has no subspecies.

The bay-capped wren-spinetail was originally described as Synallaxis maluroides. It was later placed in genus Asthenes but has been recognized in Spartonoica starting in 1950. Genetic data show that it is not closely related to genus Asthenes but instead is sister to the cachalotes of genus Pseudoseisura.

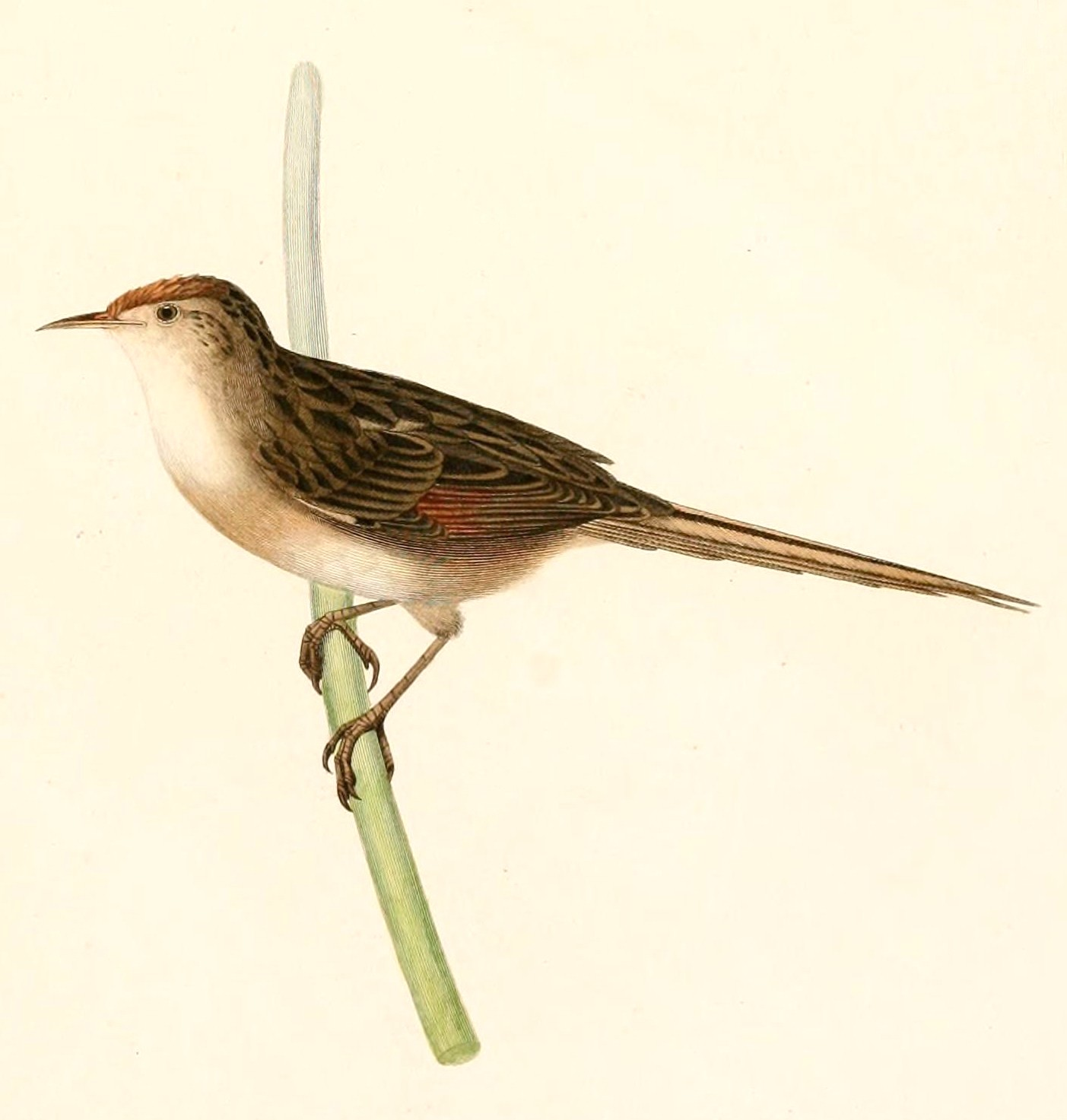

== Description ==
The bay-capped wren-spinetail is 13 to 14.5 cm (5.1 to 5.7 in) long and weighs about 10.5 g (0.37 oz). The sexes have the same plumage. Adults have a whitish supercilium on an otherwise sandy brown face. Their crown is rufous. Their upperparts are sandy brown to olive-brown with bold black streaks on the nape and upper back. Their wings are brown with cinnamon at the base of the flight feathers. Their tail is mostly brown and graduated with pointed feathers; the central pair have some black. Their underparts are whitish with a buff or cinnamon tinge on the breast, sides, and flanks. Their iris is dull white, whitish, or pale bluish, their maxilla blackish, their mandible whitish to pinkish with a dark tip, and their legs and feet light tan. There are some minor differences in size and darkness of plumage, but little genetic divergence, between coastal and inland populations.

== Distribution and habitat ==
The bay-capped wren-spinetail is found from extreme southern Brazil south through Uruguay into northern Argentina as far south as Río Negro Province. It also has occurred as a non-breeder in Paraguay. It inhabits reedbeds and sedges in freshwater, brackish, and saltwater marshes. In elevation it ranges from sea level to about 900 m (3,000 ft).

== Behavior ==
=== Movement ===
The bay-capped wren-spinetail's movements have not been fully defined. It appears to be mostly resident but the species has been noted as far north as Paraguay in the non-breeding season.

=== Feeding ===
The bay-capped wren-spinetail feeds on invertebrates, mostly insects and spiders. It usually forages alone, gleaning from marsh grasses and sedges. There is some evidence that pairs that nest in salt marshes preferentially feed in freshwater marshes.

=== Breeding ===
In Argentina the bay-capped wren-spinetail breeds between September and February. The species is monogamous, and both sexes build the nest, incubate the eggs, and brood and feed nestlings. The nest is an open cup (uniquely among furnariids) built of twigs and grass and placed low to the ground deep inside marsh vegetation. The clutch size is two to four eggs. The incubation period is about 13 days and fledging occurs 11 to 14 days after hatch.

=== Vocalization ===
The bay-capped wren-spinetail's primary song is "a grasshopper-like buzz, long and tuneless, rising and falling away". It has other vocalizations whose purposes have not been defined.

== Status ==
The IUCN originally assessed the bay-capped wren-spinetail as Near Threatened but in 2022 revised the assessment to be of Least Concern. It has a large range and an unknown population size that is believed to be decreasing. "This species is limited to wetland habitats, and is therefore highly threatened by marsh drainage and the drying effects of Eucalyptus and Pinus plantations, particularly in east Entre Ríos and north-east Corrientes [Argentina]. A further threat is overgrazing of grasslands by cattle and the establishment of wind farms."
