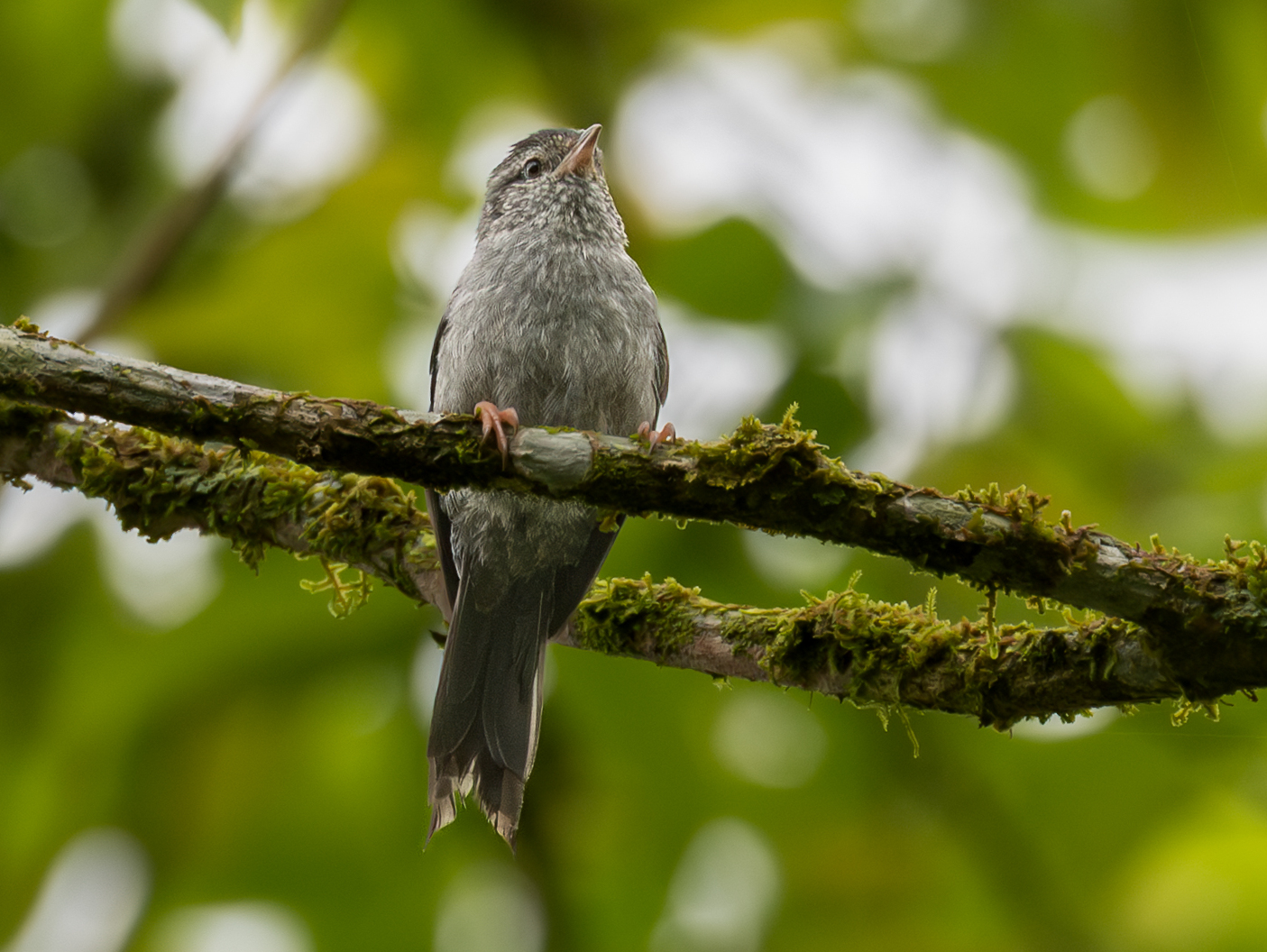

Conservation status
- Near Threatened (IUCN 3.1)

Scientific classification
- Kingdom: Animalia
- Phylum: Chordata
- Class: Aves
- Order: Passeriformes
- Family: Furnariidae
- Genus: Acrobatornis; Pacheco, B.M. Whitney & Gonzaga, 1996
- Species: A. fonsecai

Binomial name
- Acrobatornis fonsecai Pacheco, B.M. Whitney & Gonzaga, 1996

= Pink-legged graveteiro =

Species of bird

The pink-legged graveteiro (Acrobatornis fonsecai) is a species of bird in the family Furnariidae that is endemic to the Atlantic Forest located in the southeast part of Brazil, thriving in local cocoa plantations. As of 2000 the pink-legged graveteiro is listed as a near threatened species. The estimated population of the pink-legged graveteiro is between 2,500 and 9,999 individuals left in the wild. Its main habitat is cocoa plantations. It is the only member of the genus Acrobatornis.

== Description ==
The pink-legged graveteiro's most distinctive feature is, as the name suggests, its bright-pink legs and feet. The plumage, as an adult, is mainly black and gray, although juveniles are commonly more brown in color. Its size is comparable to that of a warbler at about 14 centimetres (5.5 in) as an adult, and the graveteiro is thought to be stout for a bird its size. One way to tell you have found a pink-legged graveteiro is by its unique song, usually high-pitched and beginning with sparse notes, then it accelerating, and finally finishing with a long trill.

== Diet and feeding ==
The scientific name of the species, Acrobatornis fonsecai is a reference to its acrobatic habits. It tends to hang upside-down under the canopies of trees while slinking along searching for its next meal. The diet of this bird includes mainly insects and more specifically Coleoptera, which are beetles. Some other species that were found in the stomachs of the birds were termites, moths, ants, insect larvae, insect eggs, and spiders.

== Breeding ==
The pink-legged graveteiro has many special characteristics concerning the nest that it builds. One feature of the nests is that they are shaped kind of like an oven with a single chamber inside with a roof, instead of being open on top like common nests, which is why some people call it an ovenbird. Nests are made up of sticks and twigs, and are lined with leaves and moss. The pink-legged graveteiro tends to prefer Leguminosae trees for nesting.

In a study done of the nesting of the pink-legged graveteiro, it was discovered that the nests were positioned in the canopies of tall shade trees. Also in the same study, where 131 nests were observed in seventy-four nesting trees, it was recorded that on average there were 1.8 nests per tree, and that the tree with the most nests had five. The interesting part about this study is that only one of the nests in each tree is actually used. The others are a kind of "mock" nest, and are usually smaller. The pink-legged graveteiro does this to ward off predators and to even use them as a resource for future nest building. These nests are put to use sometime between or after September and October, which happens to be their breeding season. Within the nest every family member does their part: both male and female parents play their role in the feeding of the two to three young that they produce and which still need help feeding. Unusually for a funariid, offspring that are not quite adults but can fly help with the feeding of the young, and with some repairs around the nest.

== Conservation and threats ==
The Atlantic Forest of Brazil, where the pink-legged graveteiro is located, originally covered 330,000,000 acres (1,300,000 km^{2}) of land and has quickly been reduced down to 7 percent of its original size. The forest used to stretch from Rio Grande do Norte and Ceará to the north, to Rio Grande do Sol to the south. It also used to spread out over the coastal plains and the foothills and slopes of Serra do Mar. Five percent of all vertebrates on Earth call this forest home, and there are 2,200 different types of birds, mammals, reptiles and amphibians. The Atlantic Forest holds eight percent of all the plants found on Earth, including 20,000 different types of plants, with more being discovered all the time. Because of its biodiversity, the Atlantic Forest is rightfully considered a biological hotspot. Some other statistics that directly affect the pink-legged graveteiro are that sixty percent of all Brazil's endangered animals reside here, and there are almost two hundred different bird species that are only found is this remote location on Earth.

The degradation of the Atlantic Forest began when the Portuguese pioneers came over to settle the land. To get cattle they would chop down the trees and use it as an export trade and in return they would get the cattle. Also, the French and Spanish settlers cleared the forest for their cattle ranches. These same ideas still dominate the thinking of Brazil's population today, so that remnant tropical rainforest clearing continues.

Another threat to the Atlantic Forest is population increase and the many problems that come with it. Currently the portion of Brazil that happens to have the most potential to have for the greatest biodiversity is the most populated region of Brazil. This area makes up 70% of Brazil's population, and it is the location of the majority of its industries with two of the three most populated cities in South America are located here, São Paulo and Rio de Janeiro. All of this poses major threats to the survival of the Atlantic Forest. As these two huge towns increase there will be a demand to expand which will mean taking out even more of the precious forest. They will want to make way for new housing developments as well as space for more industries to be manufactured. Along with all of this expansion and industrialization comes pollution. All different types of pollution, water, air, soil, all things that will hinder the integrity of the Atlantic Forest. Along with the people moving into Brazil comes the need for roads. The building of roads through the forests have left species of animals isolated in fragmented spaces when some of them need a large amount of space to survive.

Another problem that the Atlantic Forest faces is logging. Logging is an age old business in Brazil, but has recently expanded to the point where the government had to ban it entirely in 1990, but, done mainly illegally, logging continues to expand. The harm that this does to the land is obvious. When you wipe out a creatures habitat you take away everything they need to survive which may wipe them out too if something is not done. Monoculture and intensive land use are also harmful to the Atlantic forest, and they may go hand in hand. Eucalyptus trees are one example of a monoculture that has hurt the integrity of the forest as well as stripping the soil of nutrients without putting much back. Another intensive use of the land is grazing, whereby owners burn the forests and allow the cattle to overgraze the land to make room for the 1.8 million cows that occupy the region.

The pink-legged graveteiro populates a small area in the southeastern part of Bahia, Brazil in a part of the Atlantic Forest. More specifically, from the Rio de Contas in the north, to the Rio Jequitinhonha in the south, and from Ipiau in the west, to Itabuna in east. This part of Brazil gets more than 1,300 millimetres (51 in) of rain a year, and is a very hot and humid location. Much of this naturally forested area has been converted into cocoa plantations, which is good news for the pink-legged graveteiro because its survival seems to depend on the presence of cocoa trees. Although cocoa plantations are a type of agriculture and a lot of the biodiversity of an area is wiped out, they are one of the least destructive forms of agriculture when habitat conservation is evaluated. The main reason for this is that cocoa trees live in the under story of large shade trees. The process for preparing the land for cocoa fields consists of clearing the under story of the forest, and reducing the canopy to about 10 percent of the trees that are naturally found. This type of agriculture is beneficial because the plantations can support life at more than one level compared to types of monoculture that can only hold life at one level. It also creates habitat that connects other habitats, which helps lessen the problem of habitat fragmentation. The pink-legged graveteiro really uses the cocoa plantations to the best of its ability. In the upper level, in the shade trees is where they make their nests and raise their young. In the lower levels of cocoa trees is where the pink-legged graveteiro does its foraging. There is enough biodiversity in the lower level to support all the food sources the pink-legged graveteiro needs to survive.

The cocoa plantations are facing many threats that will harm the pink-legged graveteiro if they are not reversed. When dealing with the "Evil Quartet", habitat destruction and some over exploitation of the land are the two main factors driving the pink-legged graveteiro to endangerment. The overexploitation comes from cattle overgrazing in the pastures. The habitat destruction comes from many different problems. The first is the switch from shade crops to partly sun or even full sun crops, which will eliminate the different levels that sustain life in the shade plantations. Also, about 5,000 km of cocoa plantation are estimated to be converted to pasture land in the coming years. This will further habitat fragmentation of this area making it hard for animals that reside in the plantation to move from one part of their habitat to another part of their habitat. One problem that the plantations have already experienced and was very detrimental to their livelihood was the outbreak of a disease called "Witches' Broom" in the 1980s and 1990s. Witches' Broom is caused by the fungus Crinipellis pernicious, which around that period wiped out a large portion of the cocoa produced in Brazil and other surrounding countries. At about the same time, the market for cocoa crashed so that the owners had nothing to do for money except chop down the trees and sell them for cash, destroying the pink-legged graveteiro's habitat.

The first part of restoring the pink-legged graveteiro back to sustainable numbers, is the conservation of the Atlantic Forest. There are many conservation efforts already in place that are meant to serve the Atlantic Forest, which is home to five percent of the world's vertebrate species and eight percent of the world's plants. Only about eight percent of unbroken original habitat is left to support this hotspot. The government of Brazil is working to protect this vital piece of habitat by setting aside land for 108 national state parks, 85 federal and state biological reserves, and 31 federal and state ecological reserves, totaling 225 different areas set aside for conservation. Another successful program put in place is the private reserve system, which covers almost 1,000 kilometers of the Atlantic Forest. One main strategy that is in place to encourage biodiversity is establishing corridors because the habitats that are remaining are severely fragmented. There are many corridors being established to connect the wildlife, but the main one in the Atlantic Forest is located in the south part of Bahia and Espírito Santo.

One agency that is in the process of protecting the Atlantic Forest is the Nature Conservancy which has been in business since 1991 with a host of partners to help it along. Their plan is to have 30,000,000 acres (120,000 km^{2}) of forest restored and protected by 2015. The Nature Conservancy's main way of accomplishing this is through corridors. These corridors will help reduce the growing fragmentation problems in Brazil and ensure the gene exchange throughout the different populations that inhabit the land. One key point that the Nature Conservancy recognizes is the needs of the people that live in area). Through their program they plan to develop economic alternatives that will support both forest protection and the local people, and also provide incentives for conservation.

Another group that is helping the Atlantic Forest is the Critical Ecosystems Partnership Fund, which was started in 2002. Through this program they strive to conserve threatened and endangered species through the Species Protection Program. Also, they help people that own land in Brazil manage their land in a sustainable way through the Program for Supporting Private Natural Heritage Reserves. Not only will this support biodiversity, but it will also ensure that the land is usable in the coming years. Lastly, the Critical Ecosystems Partnership Fund will supply the technology and support that is needed for private conservation efforts through the Institutional Strengthening Program. If the people do not have the technology and support that is necessary there will be no way for them to manage their land in a sustainable way.

There have also been recommended ways to increase the biodiversity within the cocoa plantations themselves. One way is to increase the diversity of the shade crops that are used. The different types of shade crops that are brought in will bring their own pieces of biodiversity with them adding to the total biodiversity of the farm. It would also be beneficial if the shade crops that are planted were native to the area. This helps keep out a member of the "Evil Quartet", invasive species. If the farmer sticks with what is naturally found in Brazil no harmful species will accidentally be brought in. Another way that is recommended is to leave buffer zones of the natural vegetation on the edges of streams, property lines, and forest reserves. This may be a small way to add biodiversity, but if every farmer started using this tactic it would all equal out to be a large contribution to biodiversity. Also, farmers could leave small trees to grow when they are weeding their fields. Not only will this add to biodiversity of the plantation, it will also allow for more, fresh shade trees in the future. Throughout this all the native people of Brazil really need to be kept in mind. There are a few ways to do this and they include many incentives for supporting biodiversity, because without incentives the farmer is more likely to destroy the land. Some ways would be to guarantee free trade, access to pre-harvest credit, and taxing agrochemical inputs.

One group that has helped the pink-legged graveteiro specifically is Birdlife, who believes that many of the practices used in cocoa farming are not all that bad compared to other different types of agriculture. So in their conservation effort they want to encourage and assist farmers in becoming organically certified. To be an organic cocoa farmer you must maintain 20 percent of original forest on their farms. The 20 percent more original forest will give the pink-legged graveteiro a lot more space for nesting, and will also help all other types of wildlife that thrive in the original forest. It is a way to help deal with the large problem of habitat fragmentation that is happening in the Atlantic Forest by connecting the environments that surround the farms. This plan will also help the farmers. There is growing market for organically grown food, and in the end they may end up profiting from going organic. It will also help maintain the integrity of the soil so that future generations will be able to farm there too.
