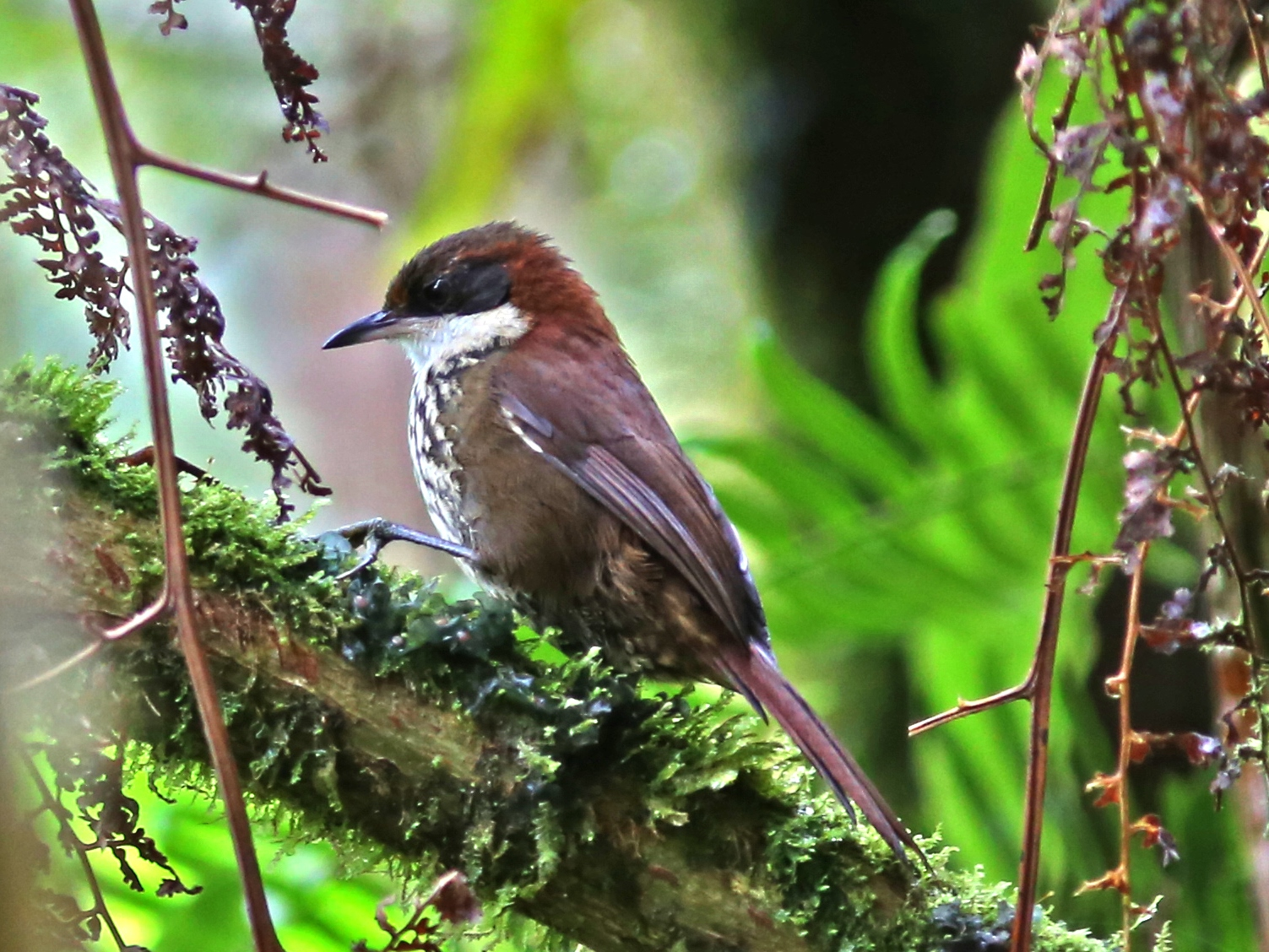

Conservation status
- Least Concern (IUCN 3.1)

Scientific classification
- Kingdom: Animalia
- Phylum: Chordata
- Class: Aves
- Order: Passeriformes
- Family: Furnariidae
- Genus: Roraimia; Chapman, 1929
- Species: R. adusta

Binomial name
- Roraimia adusta (Salvin & Godman, 1884)

Synonyms
- Synallaxis adusta

= Roraiman barbtail =

Species of bird

The Roraiman barbtail (Roraimia adusta) is a species of bird in the Furnariinae subfamily of the ovenbird family Furnariidae. It is found in Brazil, Guyana, and Venezuela.

== Taxonomy and systematics ==
The Roraiman barbtail is the only member of its genus. Beyond that its taxonomy is unsettled. The International Ornithological Committee and BirdLife International's Handbook of the Birds of the World assign it these four subspecies:

- R. a. obscurodorsalis Phelps, WH & Phelps, WH Jr, 1948
- R. a. mayri (Phelps, WH Jr, 1977)
- R. a. duidae Chapman, 1939
- R. a. adusta (Salvin & Godman, 1884)

However, the Clements taxonomy does not recognize R. a. mayri but includes it within R. a. adusta.

At various times the Roraiman barbtail has been treated as a member of genus Margarornis and as a subspecies of the stripe-breasted spinetail (Synallaxis cinnamomea). Multiple genetic studies refute those treatments and support its placement in a unique genus.

The species' English name and specific epithet derive from Mount Roraima, a prominent feature straddling the borders of Venezuela, Brazil, and Guyana, and where the type specimen was apparently collected.

This article follows the four-subspecies model.

== Description ==
The Roraiman barbtail is 14 to 15 cm (5.5 to 5.9 in) long and weighs 14 to 20 g (0.49 to 0.71 oz). It is a dramatically patterned furnariid that resembles a Margarornis treerunner but is unique in its range. The sexes have the same plumage. Adults of the nominate subspecies R. a. adusta have dark blackish brown lores and ear coverts and a wide bright chestnut supercilium that extends around the nape. Their forehead is bright chestnut, their crown dark brown, and their upperparts chestnut. Their tail is also chestnut; the feathers lack barbs at the end giving a spiky appearance. Their wing coverts are dusky brown with chestnut edges and their flight feathers are brown with a chestnut tinge. Their chin and cheeks are white with a creamy tinge on the lower throat. Their underparts are streaked brown and buff that fade towards the vent area. Their flanks are dark reddish brown and their undertail coverts rufescent brown with reddish streaks. Their iris is brown, their maxilla black, their mandible pale with a black outer third, and their legs and feet brownish gray. Juveniles have much less of a supercilium than adults and a less reddish back and less distinct streaks on their underparts.

Subspecies R. a. obscurodorsalis is darker overall than the nominate and has blackish edges on the feathers of its back. R. a. duidae has slightly brighter upperparts and a less reddish supercilium than the nominate. R. a. mayri has a browner, less chestnut, back than the nominate.

== Distribution and habitat ==
The Roraiman barbtail is found in the tepui region where Venezuela, Guyana, and Brazil meet. The subspecies are found thus:

- R. a. obscurodorsalis: Cerro Paraque in the extreme northwestern part of southeastern Venezuela's Amazonas state
- R. a. mayri: Mount Roraima in southeastern Venezuela's Bolívar state
- R. a. duidae: Cerro Duida, Cerro Huachamacari, and Serranía Parú in Venezuela's central and southern Amazonas state
- R. a. adusta: Mount Roraima and nearby tepuis in northern Brazil's Roraima state and Mt. Tewk-quay in western Guyana

The Roraiman barbtail inhabits humid montane evergreen forest and elfin forest both primary and secondary. It favors landscapes with much moss and epiphytes. In elevation it overall ranges from 1,000 to 2,500 m (3,300 to 8,200 ft) but in Brazil is found above 1,200 m (3,900 ft).

== Behavior ==
=== Movement ===
The Roraiman barbtail is a year-round resident throughout its range.

=== Feeding ===
The Roraiman barbtail feeds on arthropods. It usually forages singly or in pairs and regularly joins mixed-species feeding flocks. It forages in undergrowth, seldom more than about 6 m (20 ft) above the ground. It gleans prey from moss and epiphytes while hitching and creeping up trunks and along branches and vines.

=== Breeding ===
Nothing is known about the Roraiman barbtail's breeding biology.

=== Vocalization ===
The Roraiman barbtail's song is " 7–8 clear notes that ascend rapidly, 'tee-tee-tee-teuu-teuu-tuutuu' ". Its call is a "very high, inquiring 'whit?' ".

== Status ==
The IUCN has assessed the Roraiman barbtail as being of Least Concern. Its population size is not known but is believed to be stable. No immediate threats have been identified. It has a fragmented range and is considered generally uncommon but "[r]ather difficult to detect [and] possibly overlooked". It is "[w]ell protected in Canaima National Park, in Venezuela".
