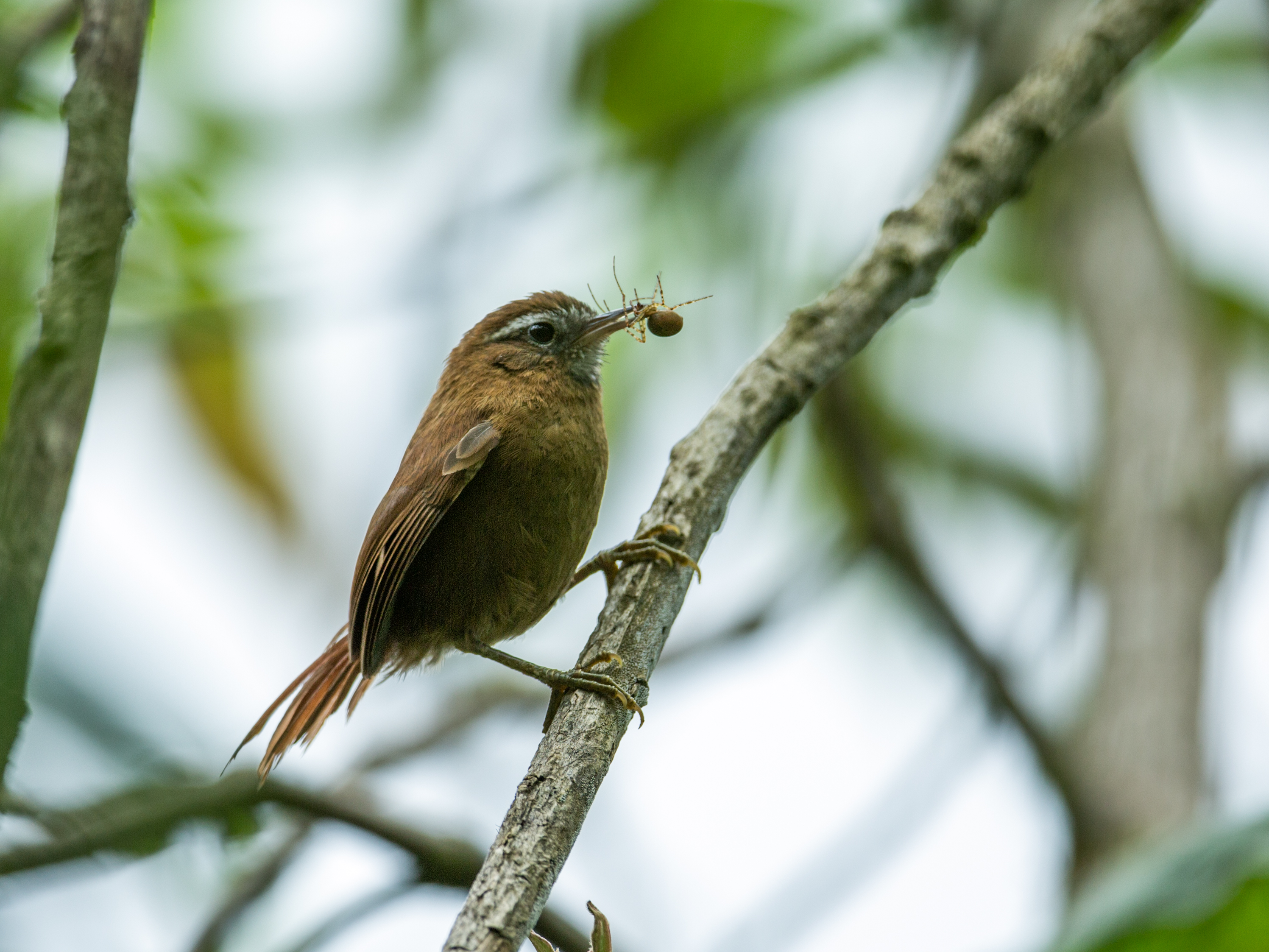
- at Pichincha, Ecuador

Conservation status
- Least Concern (IUCN 3.1)

Scientific classification
- Kingdom: Animalia
- Phylum: Chordata
- Class: Aves
- Order: Passeriformes
- Family: Furnariidae
- Genus: Hellmayrea; Sztolcman, 1926
- Species: H. gularis

Binomial name
- Hellmayrea gularis (Lafresnaye, 1843)

Synonyms
- Synallaxis gularis

= White-browed spinetail =

Species of bird

The white-browed spinetail (Hellmayrea gularis) is a species of bird in the Furnariinae subfamily of the ovenbird family Furnariidae. It is found in Colombia, Ecuador, Peru, and Venezuela.

== Taxonomy and systematics ==
Several twentieth century authors placed the white-browed spinetail in genus Synallaxis. Data published in the early twenty-first century confirm its placement in Hellmayrea, and showed that it is not closely related to Synallaxis but instead to genus Asthenes.

The white-browed spinetail is the only member of its genus and has these four subspecies:

- H. g. gularis (Lafresnaye, 1843)
- H. g. brunneidorsalis (Phelps, WH & Phelps, WH Jr, 1953)
- H. g. cinereiventris (Chapman, 1912)
- H. g. rufiventris (Berlepsch & Stolzmann, 1896)

== Description ==
The white-browed spinetail is 11 to 13.5 cm (4.3 to 5.3 in) long and weighs 11 to 15 g (0.39 to 0.53 oz). It has a short tail compared to other spinetails. The sexes have the same plumage. Adults of the nominate subspecies H. g. gularis have whitish supercilia that almost meet on the forehead on an otherwise dark rufescent brown face. Their forehead, crown, and nape are rufescent brown with faint paler streaks. Their upperparts and wings are also rufescent brown. Their tail is rufescent brown; the ends of the feathers are pointed and lack barbs. Their throat is white with a thin black band below it, and their underparts are unmarked cinnamon-brown to buffy brown, sometimes with a gray tinge. Their iris is dark brown to brown, their maxilla black to dark gray, their mandible pinkish horn to gray with a dark tip, and their legs and feet olive, olive-brown, or olive-yellowish. Juveniles have dark tips on the feathers of their breast and belly.

Subspecies H. g. brunneidorsalis has browner, less rufescent, upperparts than the nominate, with paler and grayer underparts with brown only on the flanks. H. g. cinereiventris has darker and richer brown upperparts than the nominate, with brownish gray underparts. H. g. rufiventris is darker overall than the nominate, with more rufescent upperparts and dark chestnut underparts.

== Distribution and habitat ==
The subspecies of the white-browed spinetail are found thus:

- H. g. gularis: Andes of western Venezuela, all three Andean ranges in Colombia, and both slopes of the Andes of Ecuador and northern Peru's Department of Cajamarca
- H. g. brunneidorsalis: Serranía del Perijá that straddles the northeastern Colombia - northwestern Venezuela border
- H. g. cinereiventris: Andes of western Venezuela from Trujillo south to Táchira
- H. g. rufiventris: Andes of northern and central Peru between the departments of Amazonas and Ayacucho

The white-browed spinetail is most common in elfin forest; it also inhabits montane evergreen forest and the undergrowth and edges of cloudforest, where it often occurs in thickets of Chusquea bamboo. In elevation it ranges from 2,300 to 3,900 m (7,500 to 12,800 ft).

== Behavior ==
=== Movement ===
The white-browed spinetail is a year-round resident throughout its range.

=== Feeding ===
The white-browed spinetail feeds on arthropods. It typically forages singly or in pairs, and occasionally joins mixed-species feeding flocks. It hunts acrobatically, hitching and hopping up trunks and sometimes hangs upside down to reach prey, usually in the forest's dense understorey and sometimes on the ground. It gleans and probes for its prey in moss, dense foliage, dead leaves, bark, and bamboo.

=== Breeding ===
Nothing is known about the white-browed spinetail's breeding biology.

=== Vocalization ===
The white-browed spinetail's song is "a series of high-pitched notes ending in trill, 'chit-chit-chit-chit-chi-chi-chichichichichichi' or 'cheet teet-teet-ti-tititit' ". Its calls include an "abrupt 'chip' " and a "nasal descending trill" and also "repeated single 'chiyt' or 'tseet' notes".

== Status ==
The IUCN has assessed the white-browed spinetail as being of Least Concern. It has a large range and an unknown population size that is believed to be stable. No immediate threats have been identified. It is considered generally fairly common though local in Venezuela; it is not very well known.
