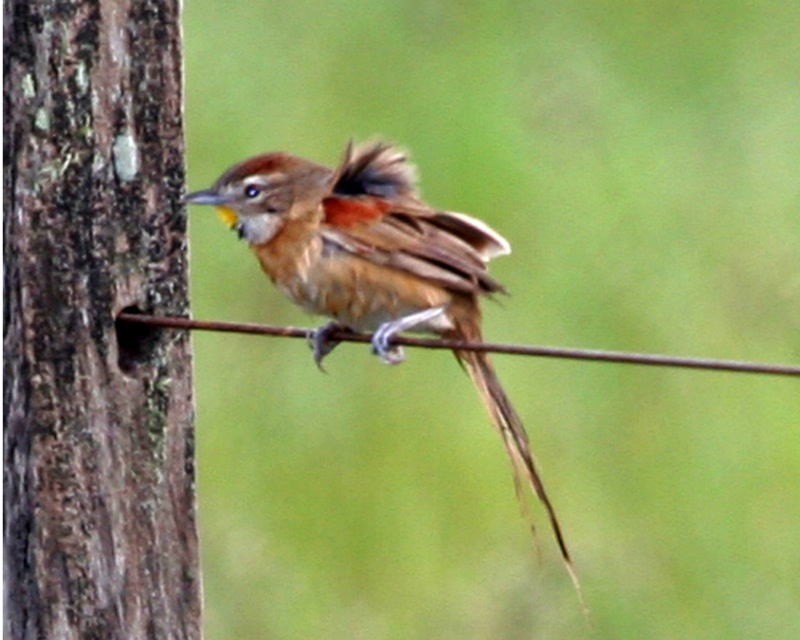

Conservation status
- Least Concern (IUCN 3.1)

Scientific classification
- Kingdom: Animalia
- Phylum: Chordata
- Class: Aves
- Order: Passeriformes
- Family: Furnariidae
- Genus: Schoeniophylax; Ridgway, 1909
- Species: S. phryganophilus

Binomial name
- Schoeniophylax phryganophilus (Vieillot, 1817)

= Chotoy spinetail =

Species of bird

The chotoy spinetail (Schoeniophylax phryganophilus) is a species of bird in the Furnariinae subfamily of the ovenbird family Furnariidae. It is found in Argentina, Bolivia, Brazil, Paraguay, and Uruguay.

== Taxonomy and systematics ==
The chotoy spinetail was originally described in genus Sylvia. Later authors placed it in Synallaxis but by the early 2010s it was recognized in its own genus Schoeniophylax. It and the white-bellied spinetail (Mazaria propinqua) are sister species.

The chotoy spinetail has two subspecies, the nominate S. p. phryganophilus (Vieillot, 1817) and S. p. petersi (Pinto, 1949).

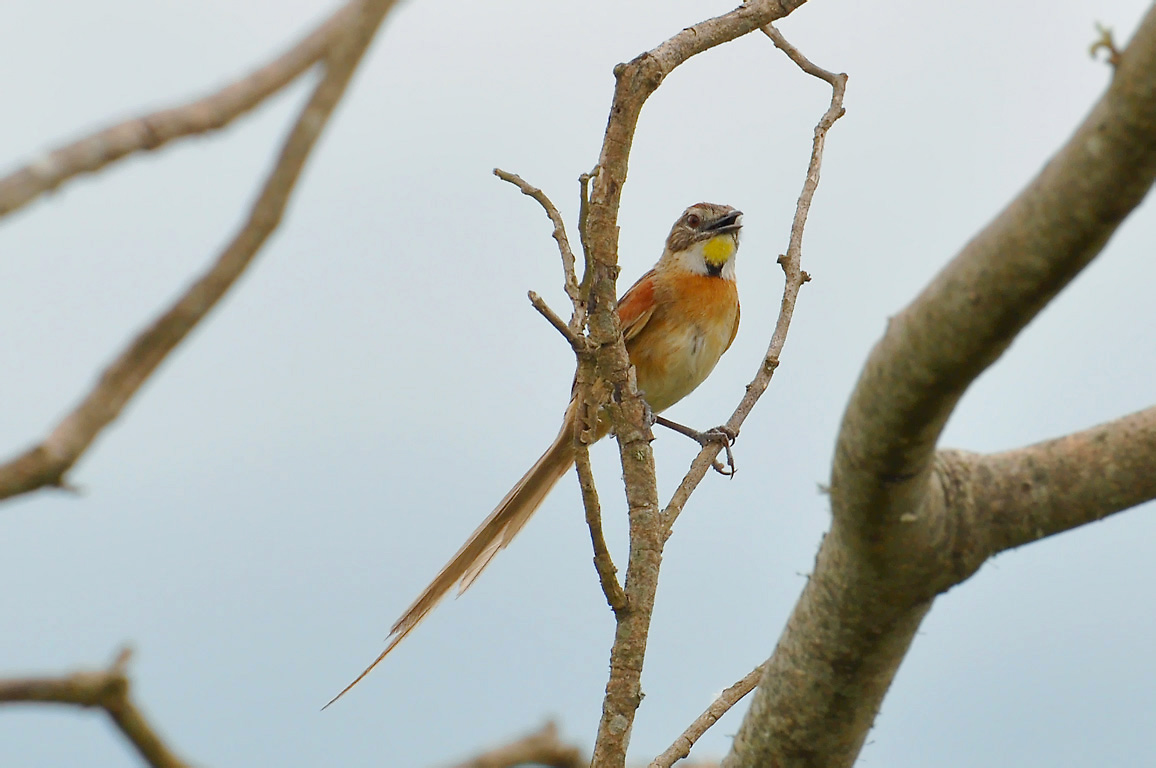
At Arroio Grande, Rio Grande do Sul, Brazil

== Description ==
The chotoy spinetail is 20 to 22 cm (7.9 to 8.7 in) long and weighs 15 to 22.5 g (0.53 to 0.79 oz). It is a large spinetail with a unique throat pattern. The sexes have the same plumage. Adults of the nominate subspecies have a white supercilium and light brown ear coverts. Their forehead is dark brown, their crown chestnut with faint brown streaks, their back sandy brown with obvious dark brown streaks, and their lower back, rump, and uppertail coverts light brown. Their wings are mostly light brown with a chestnut shoulder. Their tail is long and light brown with blackish feather shafts. Their chin and upper throat are bright yellow; the lower throat is a crisp black square surrounded by white. Their upper breast is apricot, their lower breast buffy white, their belly whitish, their flanks brownish buff, and their undertail coverts rufescent buff. Their iris is red to brown, their maxilla blackish to dark gray, their mandible gray to bluish (sometimes with a dark tip), and their legs and feet light gray to brownish. Juveniles have less sharp streaking on their uppersides than adults, a brown crown, a whitish chin, and an indistinct black throat patch. Subspecies S. p. petersi has plumage like the nominate's but is smaller.

== Distribution and habitat ==
The nominate subspecies of the chotoy spinetail is by far the more widespread of the two. It is found in eastern Bolivia, Mato Grosso do Sul and Rio Grande do Sul in Brazil, most of Paraguay, northeastern Argentina as far south as northern Buenos Aires Province, and essentially all of Uruguay. Subspecies S. p. petersi is found disjunctly in northeastern Brazil's states of Minas Gerais, Bahia, and far separated in Piauí. The species inhabits a variety of open to semi-open landscapes including treed savanna; gallery forest, thickets, and scrub along watercourses; monte woodlands; and the edges of marshes. In elevation it ranges from near sea level to 500 m (1,600 ft).

== Behavior ==
=== Movement ===
The chotoy spinetail is a year-round resident throughout its range.

=== Feeding ===
The chotoy spinetail feeds on arthropods. It typically forages singly or in pairs, gleaning prey from small branches and foliage within about 1 m (3 ft) of the ground.

=== Breeding ===
The chotoy spinetail breeds in the austral spring and summer, roughly late September to January. It is thought to be monogamous. Its nest is a large ball of thorny sticks with an entrance tube on the side; the tube and inner chamber are lined with softer plant material. It is typically placed in a bush or small tree up to about 3.5 m (11 ft) above the ground but occasionally much higher. The clutch size is three to six eggs but usually four or five. The incubation period is 15 to 16 days and fledging occurs 13 to 14 days after hatch.

=== Vocalization ===
The chotoy spinetail's song is "a distinctive series of low-pitched "cho" notes" that sound like they come from a larger bird. It has been rendered as "rrrrtooo chicheetitichichicheecheychachochoochew". Its call is a "hurried 'sreepsreeptrrit' ".

== Status ==
The IUCN has assessed the chotoy spinetail as being of Least Concern. It has a large range and an unknown population size that is believed to be stable. No immediate threats have been identified. It is considered fairly common to common and appears "fairly adaptable, occurring in secondary habitats and scrub".
