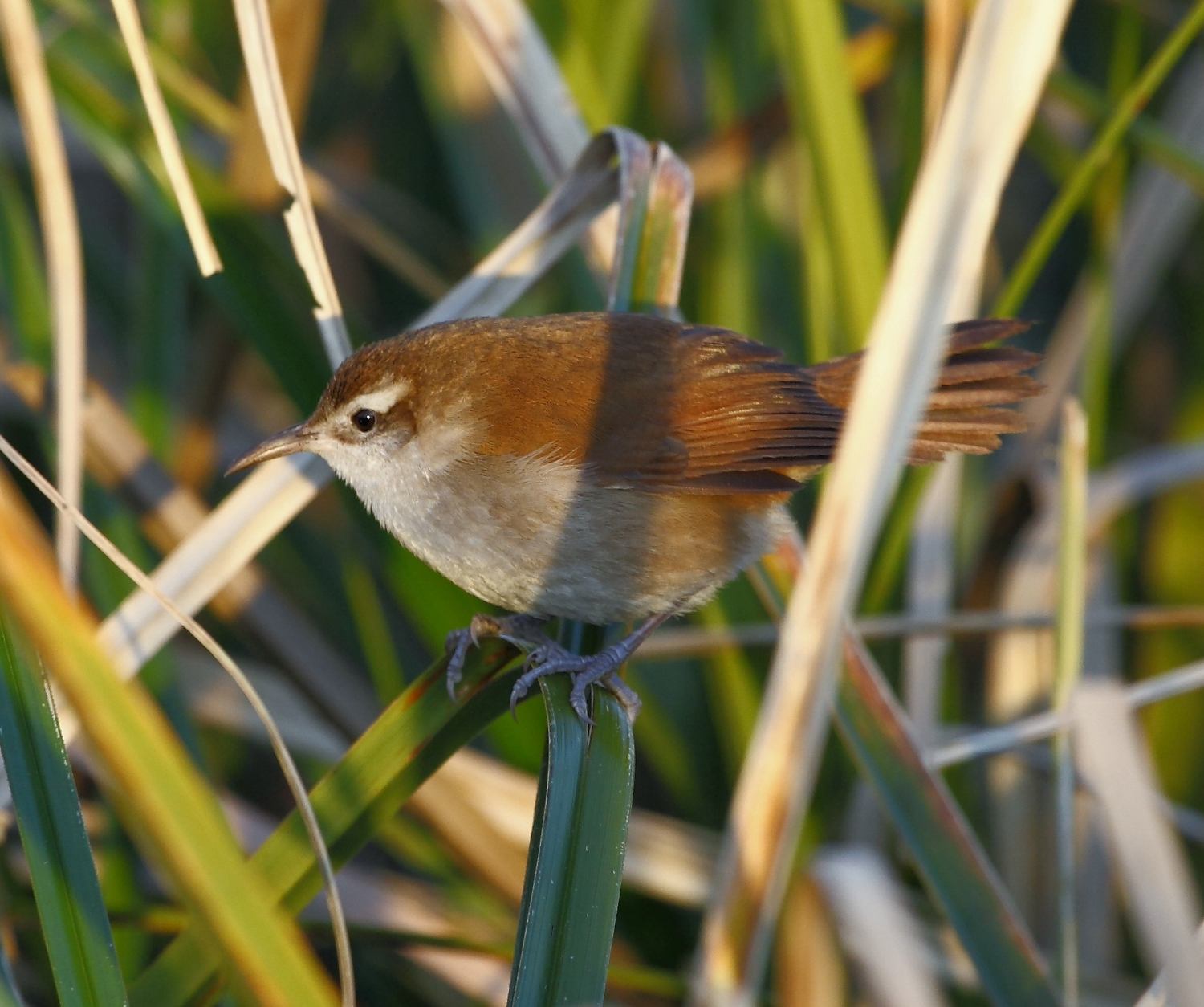
- at Montevideo, Uruguay.

Conservation status
- Least Concern (IUCN 3.1)

Scientific classification
- Kingdom: Animalia
- Phylum: Chordata
- Class: Aves
- Order: Passeriformes
- Family: Furnariidae
- Genus: Limnornis; Gould, 1839
- Species: L. curvirostris

Binomial name
- Limnornis curvirostris Gould, 1839

= Curve-billed reedhaunter =

Species of bird

The curve-billed reedhaunter (Limnornis curvirostris) is a species of bird in the Furnariinae subfamily of the ovenbird family Furnariidae. It is found in Argentina, Brazil, and Uruguay.

== Taxonomy and systematics ==
The curve-billed reedhaunter and the superficially similar straight-billed reedhaunter (Limnoctites rectirostris) were long thought to be closely related; some authors merged Limnoctites into Limnornis. Genetic studies in the early 2000s refuted this approach by finding that the two species of genus Limnoctites were instead closely related to the spinetails of genus Cranioleuca. The curve-billed reedhaunter is instead most closely related to the wren-like rushbird (Phleocryptes melanops).

The curve-billed reedhaunter is the only member of its genus and has no subspecies.

== Description ==
The curve-billed reedhaunter is 15 to 17 cm (5.9 to 6.7 in) long and weighs 27 to 30 g (0.95 to 1.1 oz). It is a small furnariid whose plumage closely resembles that of some Old World reed warblers of genus Acrocephalus. It has a long and quite decurved bill. The sexes' plumages are alike. Adults have a whitish supercilium, an ill-defined dark brown band behind the eye, lighter brown ear coverts with some thin whitish streaks, and a whitish malar area. Their crown, nape, back, rump, and uppertail coverts are rich brown; the brown is darkest on the crown and gradually becomes more rufescent to the uppertail coverts. Their wings and tail are rufescent brown. Their throat is whitish, their breast more buffy, their belly creamy buff, their flanks cinnamon-buff, and their undertail coverts a rich buff. Their iris is brown, their maxilla brown to blackish, their mandible a whitish and brownish mix, and their legs and feet grayish.

== Distribution and habitat ==
The curve-billed reedhaunter is found in the Brazilian state of Rio Grande do Sul, in southern Uruguay, and in eastern Argentina's Entre Ríos and Buenos Aires provinces. It primarily inhabits freshwater marshes and also occurs in brackish ones such as coastal lagoons. Their vegetation is often dominated by the sedge Scirpus giganteus and the grass Zizaniopsis bonarinsis. It is essentially coastal, with an elevation range from sea level to only about 100 m (330 ft).

== Behavior ==
=== Movement ===
The curve-billed reedhaunter is a year-round resident throughout its range.

=== Feeding ===
The curve-billed reedhaunter feeds on a variety of adult and larval arthropods that it gleans from marsh vegetation. It usually forages by itself.

=== Breeding ===
The curve-billed reedhaunter is assumed to breed during the austral spring and summer, and is thought to be monogamous. It constructs a ball-shaped nest of grass, leaves, and other fibers and lines it with softer plant material. The nest has a side entrance, usually with an overhanging "awning". It attaches the nest to reeds or atop vegetation. The clutch size is two eggs. The incubation period, time to fledging, and details of parental care are not known.

=== Vocalization ===
The curve-billed reedhaunter's song is a "fast series of harsh notes that ascend and then descend in pitch, fading towards [the] end". Its call is "a hollow 'took' ".

== Status ==
The IUCN originally assessed the curve-billed reedhaunter as Near Threatened, but since 2004 has classed it as being of Least Concern. It has a limited range and an unknown population size that is believed to be stable. No immediate threats have been identified. It is thought to be uncommon. It occurs in several protected areas but its "[n]arrow habitat requirements appear to render it potentially vulnerable".
