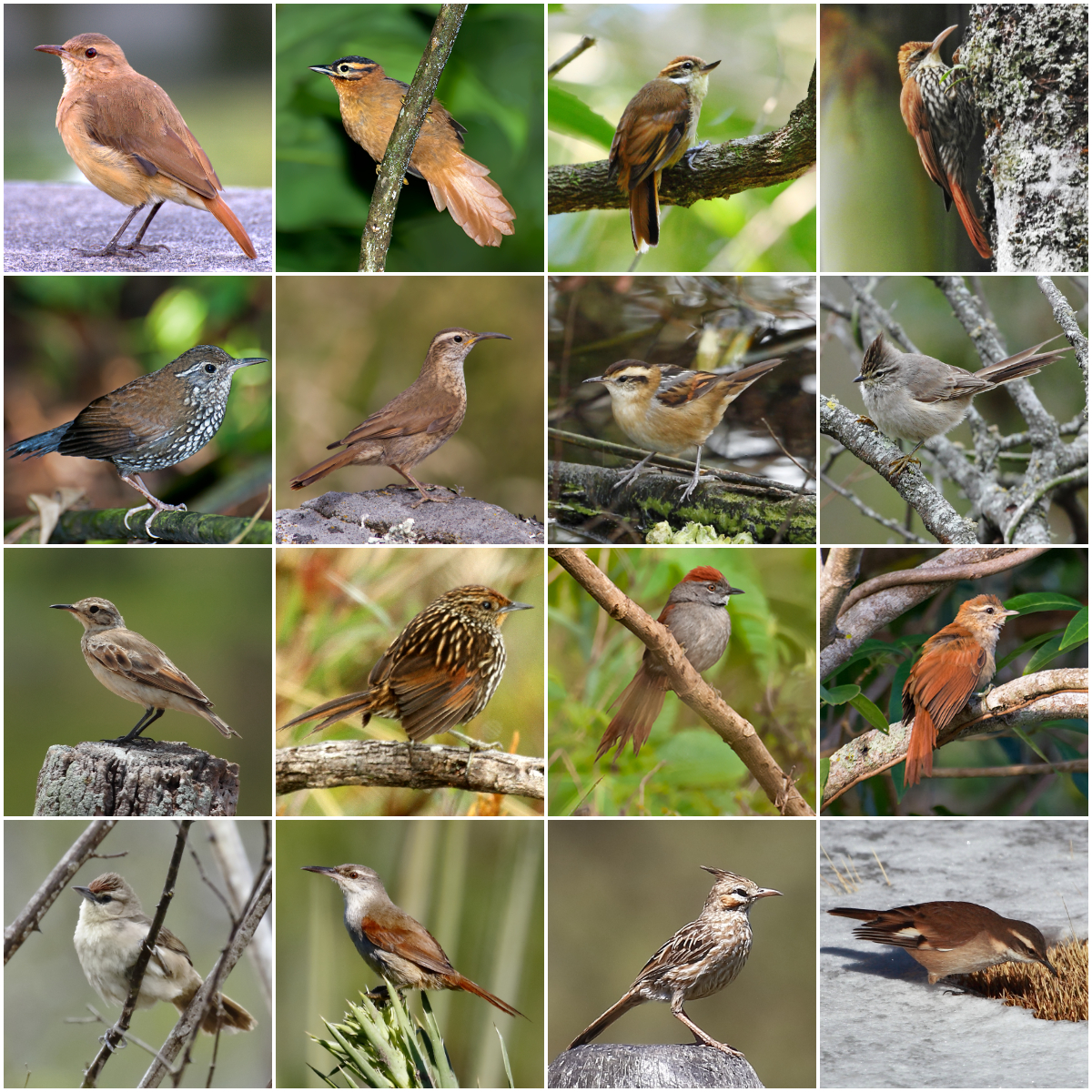
- Diversity of Furnariidae

Scientific classification
- Kingdom: Animalia
- Phylum: Chordata
- Class: Aves
- Order: Passeriformes
- Parvorder: Furnariida
- Family: Furnariidae; Gray, 1840

Subfamilies
- Sclerurinae; Dendrocolaptinae; Furnariinae

= Ovenbird (family) =

Ovenbirds

Large family of small suboscine passerine birds

Ovenbirds or furnariids are a large family of small suboscine passerine birds found from Mexico and Central to southern South America. They form the family Furnariidae. This is a large family containing around 321 species and 71 genera. The bird known as the ovenbird (Seiurus aurocapilla), which breeds in North America, is not a furnariid – rather it is a distantly related bird of the wood warbler family, Parulidae.

The ovenbirds are a diverse group of insectivores which get their name from the elaborate, vaguely "oven-like" clay nests built by the horneros, although most other ovenbirds build stick nests or nest in tunnels or clefts in rock. The Spanish word for "oven" (horno) gives the horneros their name. Furnariid nests are always constructed with a cover, and up to six pale blue, greenish or white eggs are laid. The eggs hatch after 15 to 22 days, and the young fledge after a further 13 to 20 days.

They are small to medium-sized birds, ranging from 9 to 35 cm in length. While individual species often are habitat specialists, species of this family can be found in virtually any Neotropical habitat, ranging from city parks inhabited by rufous horneros, to tropical Amazonian lowlands by many species of foliage-gleaners, to temperate barren Andean highlands inhabited by several species of miners. Two species, the seaside and the surf cinclodes, are associated with rocky coasts.

== Taxonomy and systematics ==
The woodcreepers (formerly Dendrocolaptidae) were merged into this family, following analysis of sequences. While confirming the overall phylogenetic pattern, other scientists instead opted for maintaining the woodcreepers as a separate family, while splitting the ovenbirds (as traditionally defined) into two families, Furnariidae and Scleruridae.

The cladogram below showing the subfamilies of the ovenbirds is based on a molecular genetic studies that revealed that Sclerurinae was the first group to diverge The species numbers are from the list maintained by the International Ornithologists' Union (IOC).

- Furnariidae
  - Sclerurinae – miners and leaftossers (18 species)
  - - Dendrocolaptinae – woodcreepers (60 species)
    - Furnariinae – "true" ovenbirds (243 species)

The phylogeny of the Furnariidae is now well understood thanks to multiple analyses of nuclear and mitochondrial DNA. Among other discoveries, the classification of several genera had to be revised. The taxonomic arrangement presented below is based on molecular genetic studies of ovenbird relationships. However, because ovenbirds and woodcreepers are treated here as a single family some taxonomic ranks were modified. For more detail see "List of ovenbird species".

Subfamily: Sclerurinae – miners and leaftossers

- Genus Geositta – miners (11 species)
- Genus Sclerurus – leaftossers (7 species)

Subfamily: Dendrocolaptinae – woodcreepers

- Tribe: Sittasomini – "intermediate" woodcreepers
  - Genus Dendrocincla – woodcreepers (6 species)
  - Genus Deconychura – long-tailed woodcreepers (3 species)
  - Genus Sittasomus – olivaceous woodcreeper
  - Genus Certhiasomus – spot-throated woodcreeper (genus introduced in 2010 for Deconychura stictolaema)
- Tribe: Dendrocolaptini – "strong-billed" woodcreepers
  - Genus Glyphorynchus – wedge-billed woodcreeper
  - Genus Nasica – long-billed woodcreeper
  - Genus Dendrexetastes – cinnamon-throated woodcreeper
  - Genus Dendrocolaptes – woodcreepers (5 species)
  - Genus Hylexetastes – woodcreepers (3 species)
  - Genus Xiphocolaptes – woodcreepers (4 species)
  - Genus Dendroplex – straight-billed woodcreepers (2 species, formerly in Xiphorhynchus)
  - Genus Xiphorhynchus – woodcreepers (13 species)
  - Genus Lepidocolaptes – narrow-billed woodcreepers (11 species)
  - Genus Drymornis – scimitar-billed woodcreeper
  - Genus Drymotoxeres – greater scythebill
  - Genus Campylorhamphus – scythebills (6 species)

Subfamily: Furnariinae – Neotropical ovenbirds and allies

- Genus: Xenops – xenops (5 species)
- Genus Berlepschia – point-tailed palmcreeper
- Tribe Pygarrhichini
  - Genus Pygarrhichas – white-throated treerunner
  - Genus Microxenops – rufous-tailed xenops
  - Genus Ochetorhynchus – earthcreepers (4 species formerly included in Upucerthia)
- Tribe Furnariini – horneros and allies
  - Genus Pseudocolaptes – tuftedcheeks (3 species)
  - Genus Premnornis – rusty-winged barbtail
  - Genus Tarphonomus – earthcreepers (genus introduced in 2007 for 2 species formerly included in Upucerthia)
  - Genus Geocerthia – striated earthcreeper (genus introduced in 2009 for U. serrrana)
  - Genus Upucerthia – earthcreepers (4 species)
  - Genus Cinclodes – cinclodes (15 species)
  - Genus Furnarius – horneros (8 species)
  - Genus Lochmias – sharp-tailed streamcreeper
  - Genus Phleocryptes – wren-like rushbird
  - Genus Limnornis – curve-billed reedhaunter

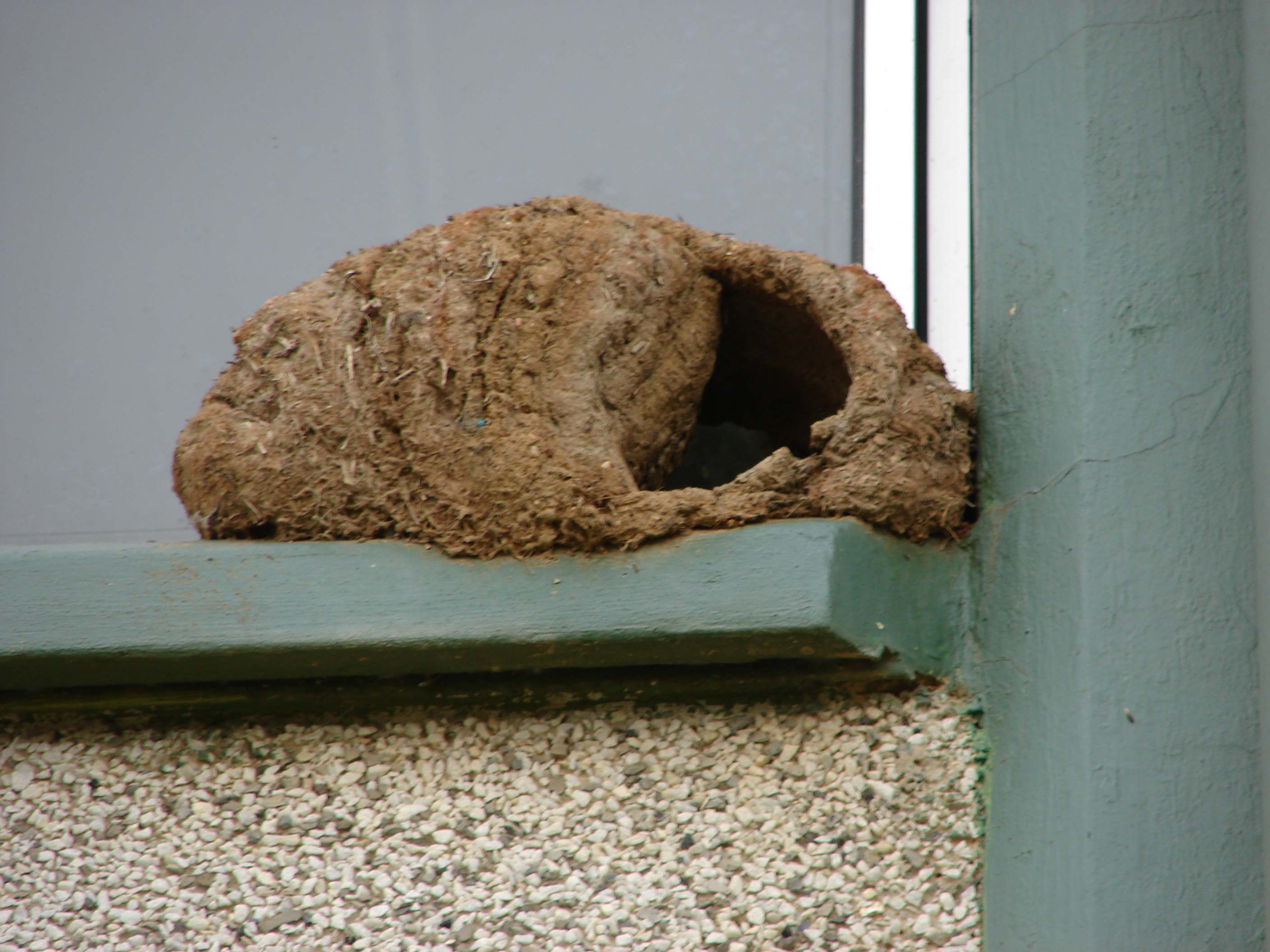
Rufous hornero (Furnarius rufus) nest, showing the entrance chamber and dividing wall to breeding chamber

- Tribe Philydorini – foliage-gleaners and allies
  - Genus Megaxenops – great xenops
  - Genus Anabazenops – foliage-gleaners (2 species)
  - Genus Ancistrops – chestnut-winged hookbill
  - Genus Cichlocolaptes – (2 species)
  - Genus Heliobletus – sharp-billed treehunter
  - Genus Neophilydor – foliage-gleaners (genus introduced in 2023 for 2 species formerly in Philydor)
  - Genus Philydor – foliage-gleaners (3 species)
  - Genus Dendroma – foliage-gleaners (2 species)
  - Genus Anabacerthia – foliage-gleaners (5 species)
  - Genus Syndactyla – foliage-gleaners (8 species)
  - Genus Clibanornis – (5 species)
  - Genus Thripadectes – treehunters (7 species)
  - Genus Automolus – foliage-gleaners (11 species)
- Tribe Synallaxini – spinetails and allies
  - Genus Margarornis – treerunners (4 species)
  - Genus Premnoplex – typical barbtails (2 species)
  - Genus Aphrastura – rayaditos (3 species)
  - Genus Hellmayrea – white-browed spinetail
  - Genus Sylviorthorhynchus – (2 species)
  - Genus Leptasthenura – tit-spinetails (9 species)
  - Genus Phacellodomus – thornbirds (10 species)
  - Genus Anumbius – firewood-gatherer
  - Genus Coryphistera – lark-like brushrunner
  - Genus Pseudoseisura – cacholotes (4 species)
  - Genus Pseudasthenes – false canasteros
  - Genus Spartonoica – bay-capped wren-spinetail
  - Genus Asthenes – canasteros (29 species)
  - Genus Certhiaxis – spinetails (2 species)
  - Genus Mazaria – white-bellied spinetail
  - Genus Schoeniophylax – chotoy spinetail
  - Genus Synallaxis – spinetails (37 species)
  - Genus Siptornis – spectacled prickletail
  - Genus Metopothrix – orange-fronted plushcrown
  - Genus Xenerpestes – graytails (2 species)
  - Genus Acrobatornis – pink-legged graveteiro
  - Genus Limnoctites – reedhaunters (2 species)
  - Genus Thripophaga – softtails (5 species)
  - Genus Cranioleuca – typical spinetails (20 species)
  - Genus Roraimia – Roraiman barbtail

The phylogenetic tree shown below is based on a large-scale genetic 2020 study of the suboscines by Michael Harvey and collaborators. The tawny tit-spinetail (Leptasthenura yanacencis) has been moved to the genus Sylviorthorhynchus, the sulphur-bearded spinetail (Cranioleuca sulphurifera) has been moved to the genus Limnoctites and its English name changed to the sulphur-bearded reedhaunter, and the white-bellied spinetail (Synallaxis propinqua) has been placed in the monotypic genus Mazaria. These changes are included in the tree shown below. The remaining paraphyletic genera are flagged in the tree by an asterisk.

In 2009, the large ovenbird family was divided into tribes by Robert Moyle and collaborators. The tribes as defined in the 2009 article do not fit well with the revised taxonomy of Harvey and are not included here. For example, the tribe Furnariini as defined in the 2009 article is not monophyletic in the Harvey phylogeny. The species numbers in the cladogram are from the list maintained by the International Ornithologists' Union (IOC).

- Furnariinae
  - Xenops – xenops (5 species)
  - - Berlepschia – point-tailed palmcreeper
    - - - Microxenops – rufous-tailed xenops
        - - Pygarrhichas – white-throated treerunner
          - Ochetorhynchus – earthcreepers and crag chilia (4 species)
      - - - Premnoplex – barbtails (2 species)
          - Margarornis – treerunners (4 species)
        - - - - - Cichlocolaptes – treehunters (2 species)
                - - *Philydor pyrrhodes – cinnamon-rumped foliage-gleaner
                  - - *Philydor atricapillus (type of genus) – black-capped foliage-gleaner
                    - Heliobletus – sharp-billed treehunter
              - - - Neophilydor – foliage-gleaners (2 species) (formerly in Philydor)
                  - Anabazenops – foliage-gleaners (2 species)
                - - Megaxenops – great xenops
                  - - Anabacerthia – foliage-gleaners (5 species)
                    - Syndactyla – foliage-gleaners (8 species)
            - - - Ancistrops – chestnut-winged hookbill
                - Dendroma – foliage-gleaners (2 species)
              - - Clibanornis – foliage-gleaners (5 species)
                - - Thripadectes – treehunters (7 species)
                  - Automolus – foliage-gleaners and woodhaunters (10 species)
          - - - Tarphonomus – earthcreepers (2 species)
              - - Premnornis – rusty-winged barbtail
                - Pseudocolaptes – tufted-cheeks (3 species)
            - - - - Furnarius – horneros (8 species)
                  - - Lochmias – sharp-tailed streamcreeper
                    - - Limnornis – curve-billed reedhaunter
                      - Phleocryptes – wren-like rushbird
                - - Geocerthia – striated earthcreeper
                  - - Upucerthia – earthcreepers (4 species)
                    - Cinclodes – cincloides (15 species)
              - - Aphrastura – rayaditos (2 species)
                - - - Sylviorthorhynchus – Des Murs's wiretail and tawny tit-spinetail (2 species)
                    - Leptasthenura – tit-spinetails (9 species)
                  - - - Phacellodomus – thornbirds (10 species)
                      - - Anumbius – firewood-gatherer
                        - Coryphistera – lark-like brushrunner
                    - - - Hellmayrea – white-browed spinetail
                        - Asthenes – canasteros and thistletails (30 species)
                      - - - Pseudasthenes – canasteros (4 species)
                          - - Synallaxis – spinetails (37 species)
                            - - Certhiaxis – spinetails (2 species)
                              - - Schoeniophylax – chotoy spinetail
                                - Mazaria – white-bellied spinetail
                        - - - Spartonoica – bay-capped wren-spinetail
                            - Pseudoseisura – cacholotes (4 species)
                          - - - Acrobatornis – pink-legged graveteiro
                              - - Metopothrix – orange-fronted plushcrown
                                - Xenerpestes – greytails (2 species)
                            - - Siptornis – spectacled prickletail
                              - - - *Thripophaga gutturata – speckled spinetail (formerly in Cranioleuca)
                                  - - *Thripophaga fusciceps – plain softtail
                                    - - Roraimia – Roraiman barbtail
                                      - *Thripophaga macroura (type) – striated softtail
                                - - Limnoctites – reedhaunters (2 species)
                                  - Cranioleuca – spinetails (20 species)

== Fossil record ==
Furnariids boast a notable fossil record for a passerine family. Numerous fossils comprising multiple skeletal elements, including cranial remains, have facilitated the identification and description of five distinct fossil species. Among these, two have been classified within the extant genera Cinclodes and Pseudoseisura, while the remaining three belong into the extinct genus Pseudoseisuropsis. All fossil are of Pleistocene age.

- †Pseudoseisuropsis nehuen Noriega 1991, early Pleistocene of Argentina.
- †Pseudoseisuropsis cuelloi Claramunt & Rinderknecht 2005, late Pleistocene of Uruguay.
- †Pseudoseisuropsis wintu Stefanini et al. 2016, Early Pleistocene of Argentina.
- †Cinclodes major Toni 1977, Pleistocene of Argentina.
- †Pseudoseisura cursor Toni & Noriega, 2001, Pleistocene of Argentina.
