= Earthcreeper =

The earthcreepers are several South American species of birds in the family Furnariidae:

- Genus Upucerthia:
  - White-throated earthcreeper (Upucerthia albigula)
  - Scale-throated earthcreeper (Upucerthia dumetaria)
  - Plain-breasted earthcreeper (Upucerthia jelskii)
  - Striated earthcreeper (Upucerthia serrana)
  - Buff-breasted earthcreeper (Upucerthia validirostris)
- Genus Ochetorhynchus:
  - Rock earthcreeper (Ochetorhynchus andaecola) – formerly in genus Upucerthia.
  - Straight-billed earthcreeper (Ochetorhynchus ruficaudus ) – formerly in genus Upucerthia.
  - Band-tailed earthcreeper (Ochetorhynchus phoenicurus) – formerly in monotypic genus Eremobius.
- Genus Tarphonomus
  - Bolivian earthcreeper (Tarphonomus harterti) – formerly in genus Upucerthia.
  - Chaco earthcreeper (Tarphonomus certhioides) – formerly in genus Upucerthia.
