= Treerunner =

The treerunners are several species of bird in the ovenbird family Furnariidae:

- Genus Margarornis:
  - Ruddy treerunner (Margarornis rubiginosus)
  - Star-chested treerunner (Margarornis stellatus)
  - Beautiful treerunner (Margarornis bellulus)
  - Pearled treerunner (Margarornis squamiger)
- Genus Pygarrhichas:
  - White-throated treerunner (Pygarrhichas albogularis)
