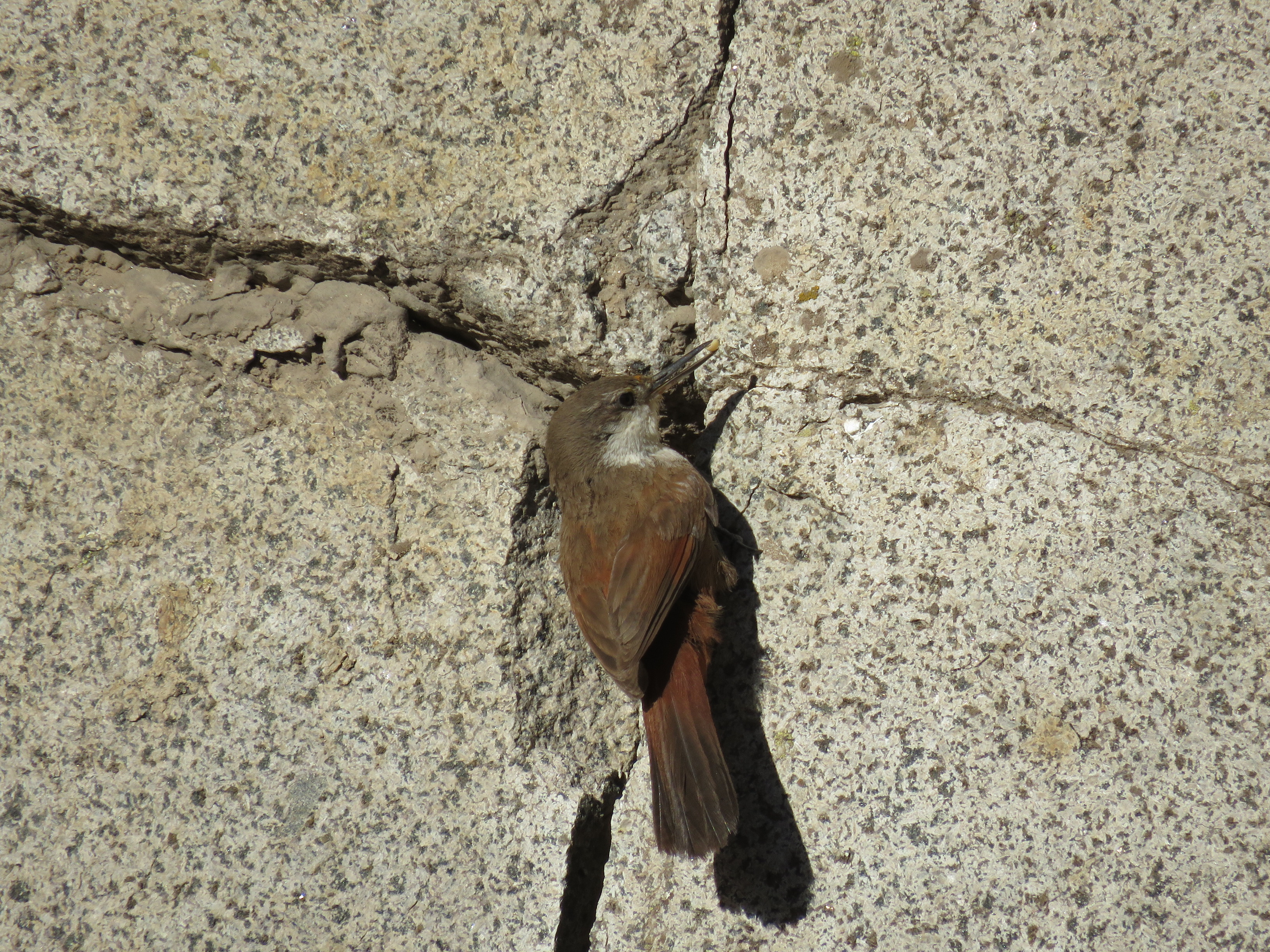

Conservation status
- Least Concern (IUCN 3.1)

Scientific classification
- Kingdom: Animalia
- Phylum: Chordata
- Class: Aves
- Order: Passeriformes
- Family: Furnariidae
- Genus: Ochetorhynchus
- Species: O. melanurus

Binomial name
- Ochetorhynchus melanurus (Gray, 1846)

Synonyms
- Chilia melanura; Ochetorhynchus melanura

= Crag chilia =

Species of bird

The crag chilia or crag earthcreeper (Ochetorhynchus melanurus) is a species of bird in the Furnariinae subfamily of the ovenbird family Furnariidae. It is endemic to Chile.

== Taxonomy and systematics ==
The crag chilia was formerly placed in its own genus, Chilia. It is now placed in genus Ochetorhynchus with the straight-billed earthcreeper (O. ruficaudus), the rock earthcreeper (O. andaecola), and the band-tailed earthcreeper (O. phoenicurus). Two subspecies are recognized, O. m. melanurus and O. m. atacamae.

== Description ==
The crag chilia is 18 to 19 cm (7.1 to 7.5 in) long and weighs 31 to 40 g (1.1 to 1.4 oz). Adults of the nominate subspecies O. m. melanurus have a narrow whitish supercilium, dark brown lores and auriculars, and whitish cheeks. Their upperparts are mostly darkish brown with a rufous rump and uppertail coverts. Their tail is mostly blackish brown with some rufous at the base and outer web of the outermost pair of feathers. Their upperwing coverts are dusky brown and their wings are darkish brown with a wide rufous band. Their throat is whitish, their breast dull smoky grayish, their belly dull brown, and their flanks and undertail coverts rufous. Their iris is brown, their maxilla blackish, their mandible pale gray with a blackish tip, and their legs and feet blackish. Juveniles have pale edges on their back feathers and faint barring on their underparts.

Subspecies O. m. atacamae is paler and sandier than the nominate. Its supercilium is whiter and more distinct. Its upperwing coverts are grayish brown, its breast pale grayish with white streaks, and its flanks pale brown. Its bill is shorter and narrower.

== Distribution and habitat ==
The crag chilia is endemic to north-central and central Chile. Subspecies O. m. atacamae is found from Huasco Province in the Atacama Region to the Coquimbo Region. O. m. melanurus is found further south, between San Felipe de Aconcagua Province in the Valparaíso Region and Colchagua Province in the O'Higgins Region.

The crag chilia inhabits arid scrublands with shrubby rock hillsides and cliffs with sparse vegetation. There is no consensus on its elevational range. In the non-breeding season it occurs as low as sea level. In the breeding season, different authors place its upper limit between 2,200 and 3,000 m (7,200 and 9,800 ft).

== Behavior ==
=== Movement ===
The crag chilia's migration pattern has not been fully described but the species apparently moves from higher elevations to lower ones for the austral winter of May to August.

=== Feeding ===
The crag chilia's diet is predominantly arthropods such as Orthoptera and Lepidoptera but also includes seeds and fruits such as those of Tristerix species and Ephedra chilensis. It is usually a solitary forager that gleans from rocks and bushes and also probes crevices.

=== Breeding ===
The species is presumed to be monogamous and its nesting season to be the austral spring and summer of September to March. At least in atacamae pairs establish as early as June. The nest is a bulky ball of sticks lined with feathers and is usually placed in a rock cavity, though some have been found in holes in earth banks and rural buildings. The clutch is three or four eggs. The incubation period and time to fledging are not known. Both parents provision nestlings.

=== Vocalization ===
The crag chilia's song is "a short (1 second) staccato chatter of jumbled notes with 4–7 loud 'teet' notes in [the] middle". Its call is "a metallic, abrupt 'ch' or 'ch-ch', often given as continuous chatter".

== Status ==
The IUCN has assessed the crag chilia as being of Least concern. It has a somewhat limited range, and though its population size is not known it is believed to be stable. No immediate threats have been identified. It is considered relatively uncommon. It occurs in a few protected areas and hunting it is illegal.
