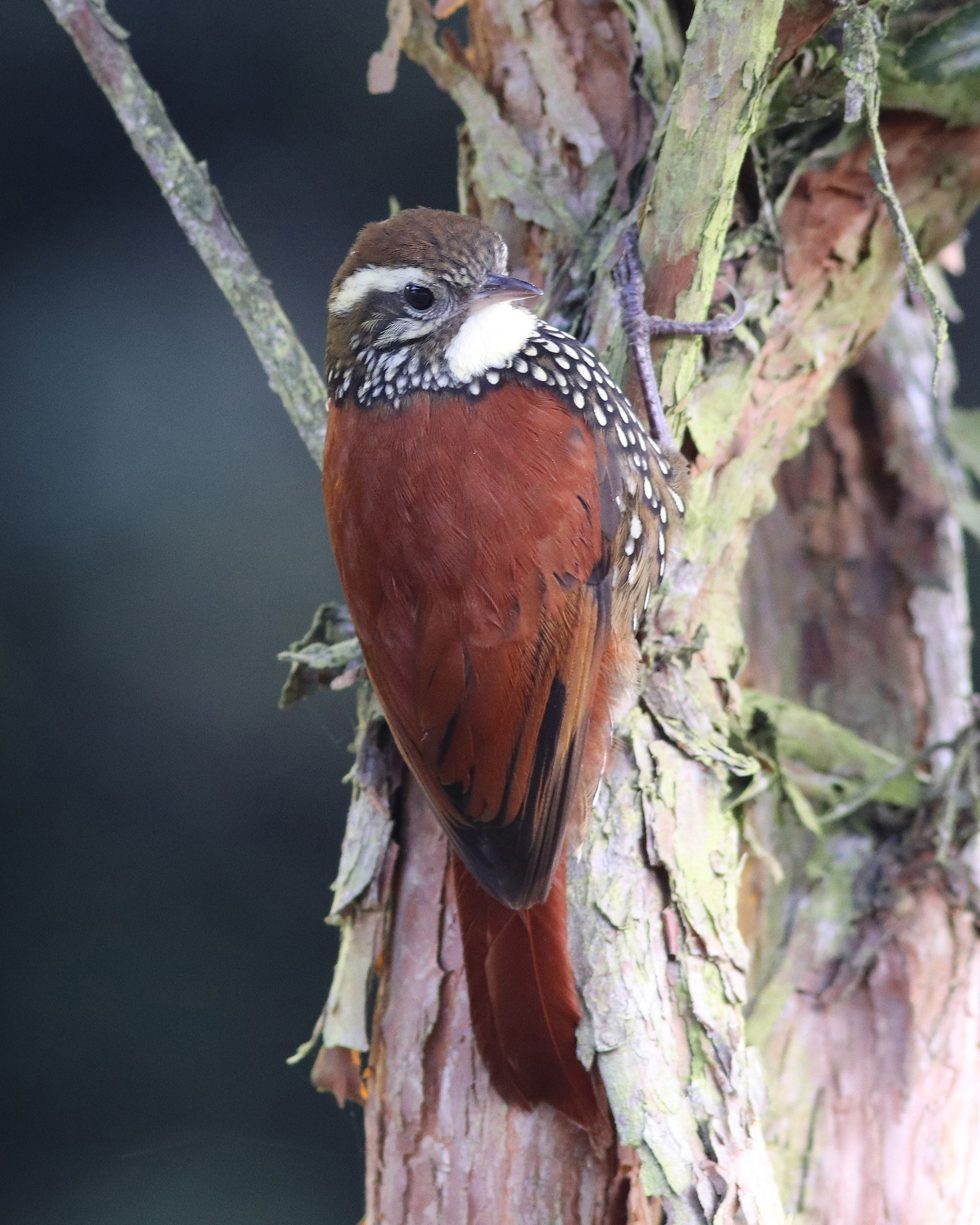
- Pearled treerunner, Margarornis squamiger

Scientific classification
- Kingdom: Animalia
- Phylum: Chordata
- Class: Aves
- Order: Passeriformes
- Family: Furnariidae
- Genus: Margarornis; Reichenbach, 1853

Type species
- Sittasomus perlatus Pearled treerunner Lesson, 1844

Species
- Margarornis bellulus Margarornis rubiginosus Margarornis squamiger Margarornis stellatus

= Margarornis =

Genus of birds

Margarornis is a genus of passerine birds in the ovenbird family Furnariidae. They are found in South and Middle America. All four species in the genus have "treerunner" in their English name.

== Taxonomy ==
The genus Margarornis was introduced in 1853 by the German naturalist Ludwig Reichenbach. The name combines the Ancient Greek margaron meaning "pearl" with ornis meaning "bird". The type species was designated by George Robert Gray in 1855 as Sittasomus perlatus Lesson. This taxon is now considered to be a subspecies of the pearled treerunner (Margarornis squamiger perlatus).

=== Species ===
The genus contains four species:

Image	Scientific name	Common name	Distribution
	Margarornis rubiginosus	Ruddy treerunner	Costa Rica and western Panama.
	Margarornis stellatus	Star-chested treerunner	Colombia and Ecuador.
	Margarornis bellulus	Beautiful treerunner	Panama
	Margarornis squamiger	Pearled treerunner	northern Andes

The white-throated treerunner is placed in the monotypic genus Pygarrhichas.
