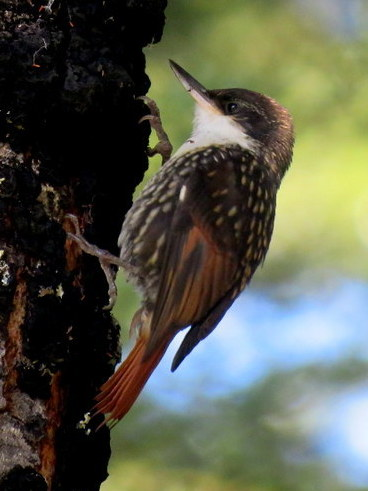

Conservation status
- Least Concern (IUCN 3.1)

Scientific classification
- Kingdom: Animalia
- Phylum: Chordata
- Class: Aves
- Order: Passeriformes
- Family: Furnariidae
- Genus: Pygarrhichas; Burmeister, 1837
- Species: P. albogularis

Binomial name
- Pygarrhichas albogularis (King, 1831)
- White-throated treerunner range

= White-throated treerunner =

Species of bird

The white-throated treerunner (Pygarrhichas albogularis) is a species of bird in the family Furnariidae. It is the only species in the genus Pygarrhichas. The white-throated treerunner is about 15 cm (5.9 in) long, with a stiff and rounded tail. The upperparts are dark brown, turning red on the lower back and tail and contrasting sharply with the throat and chest of a bright white. The rest of the underparts are coarsely mottled with white. The bill is long, slightly curved upwards. The general appearance is reminiscent of a nuthatch (Sitta spp.), although they are not directly related. Like the Sittidae, Furnariidae tirelessly scours the trunks and branches of old trees for the small arthropods that make up its food, spiraling up the trunks, or sometimes moving head down. The white-throated treerunner consumes small invertebrates found on bark and nests in tree cavities. Outside of the breeding season, it may form mixed-species foraging flocks with other bird species.

The White-throated treerunner inhabits the southern tip of the American continent, in Chile and Argentina, from Santiago and Mendoza to Tierra del Fuego. It seeks out forests with large trees – the old trunks offer suitable nesting sites – whether they are lowland or highland, dense or open. It was described in 1831 by Phillip Parker King, a British explorer of Patagonia and Tierra del Fuego. Its systematic placement has remained unclear within its family, superficial similarities with other Furnariidae gleaning their food from the bark of trees seem to be the result of an evolutionary convergence. Molecular phylogenies seem to link it to the genera Microxenops and Ochetorhynchus. No subspecies is described. Its range is relatively large and there is no evidence of decline in numbers, so the International Union for Conservation of Nature considers this bird to be of "least concern".

== Taxonomy ==
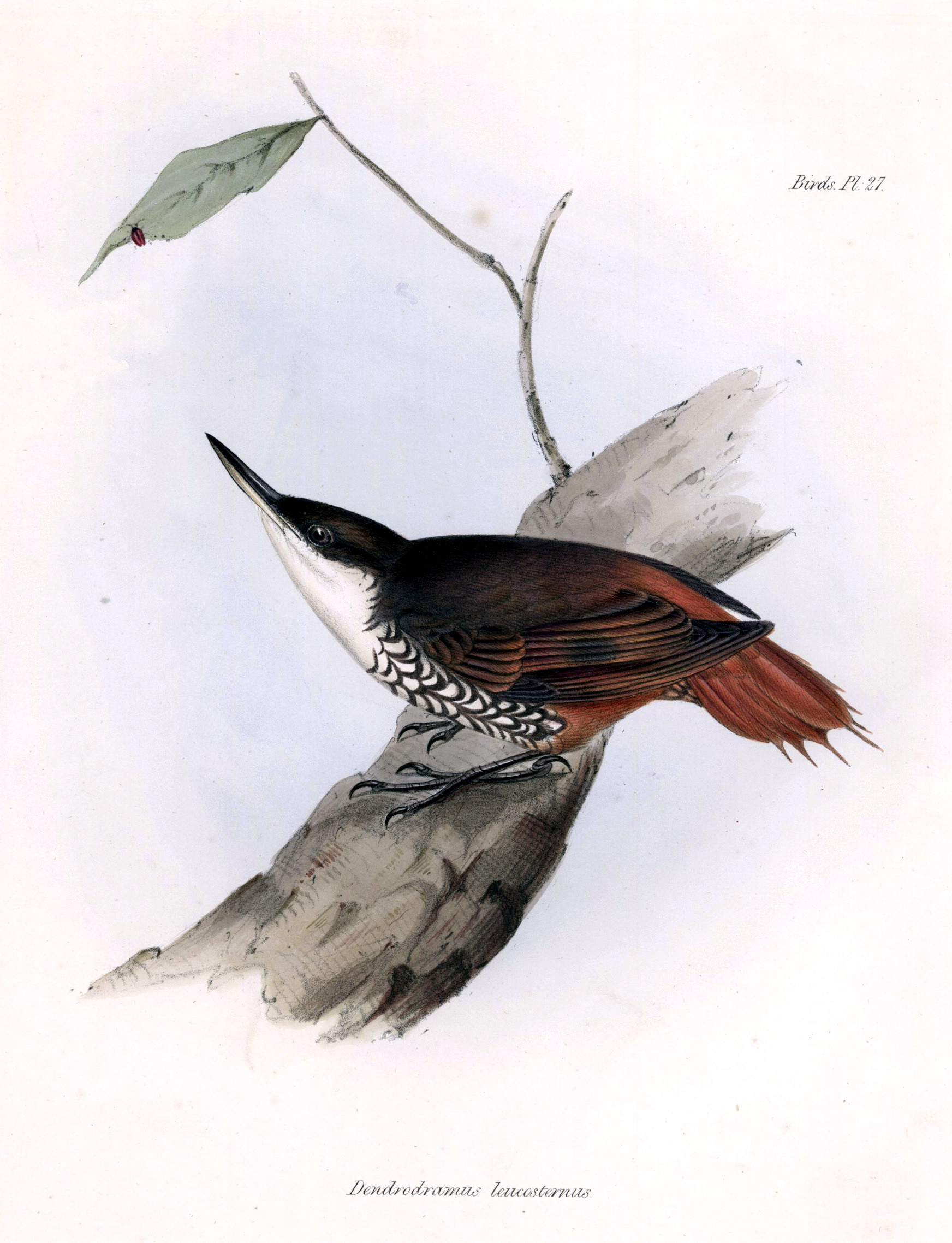
Plate of John Gould, who describes the species under the name of Dendrodramus leucosternus in 1839.

The white-throated treerunner was scientifically described in 1831 under the protonym Dendrocolaptes albogularis by the British explorer Phillip Parker King, who visited Patagonia and Tierra del Fuego among other places. The specific name, albogularis, means "white-throated" in Latin; the type locality is not known but is supposed to be the Strait of Magellan. In 1837, the Argentine zoologist Hermann Burmeister removed the species from the genus Dendrocolaptes, which today includes only five species of climbers, and assigned it a separate genus, Pygarrhichas, giving it the novel specific name of "ruficaudis" (from Latin meaning "red-tailed"). Burmeister constructs this name from the ancient Greek πυγη (pugē) meaning "rump" and αρριχος (arrhikhos) denoting wicker, to refer to the stiffness of the bird's tail helping it progress along trunks.

In 1839, English ornithologist John Gould, presumably unaware of King's work, independently described the species in Zoology of the Voyage of H.M.S. Beagle as Dendrodramus leucosternus (from the ancient Greek for "white-bellied"). He observed the species on the Chiloé Island, and found similarities with the Eurasian treecreeper (Certhia familiaris) in its behavior. In 1890, English zoologist Philip Lutley Sclater placed this genus in the now obsolete family Dendrocolaptidae, a position changed by paleornithologist Alan Feduccia in 1973 who placed the genus in its current family, Furnariidae. According to the International Ornithological Congress and Alan P. Peterson, no subspecies is distinguished.

=== Placement in the family ===
In 1839, Gould mentions that English zoologist George Robert Gray would relate the white-throated treerunner to the genus Dendroplex described by English ornithologist William Swainson. In the 2003 Handbook of the Birds of the World, Volume 8, American ornithologist James Van Remsen Jr. explains that while P. albogularis is traditionally related to the Xenops sittines and other tree-bark gleaning Furnariidae, plumage and biogeography suggest that these different species are not directly related and that their similarities are merely the result of convergent evolution. It has also been suggested that similarities in plumage and foraging behavior may bring the white-throated treerunner closer to Synallaxis of the genus Aphrastura.

Two molecular phylogenies of the family published in 2009, and then one in 2011, negate such relatedness and clarify the evolutionary history somewhat while implying significant classification changes. The naming of a subfamily (that of "Pygarrhichinae") or tribe (that of "Pygarrhichini", within the subfamily Furnariinae) is advanced for a clade that would include the white-throated treerunner, the rufous-tailed xenops (Microxenops milleri), species of the genus Ochetorhynchus, and would absorb the band-tailed Eremobius (O. phoenicurus) as well as the crag chilia (O. melanurus), previously placed in the monotypic genera Eremobius and Chilia respectively.

Possible phylogeny of Furnariidae:

- Furnariidae
  - Sclerurinae (Sclerurus et Geositta)
  - - Dendrocolaptinae (Dendrocolaptinae)
    - - Xenopinae (Xenops)
      - Furnariinae
        - Berlepschiini (Berlepschia)
        - - Pygarrhichadini
            - Microxenops
            - - Pygarrhichas
              - Ochetorhynchus
          - other Furnariinae

== Description ==
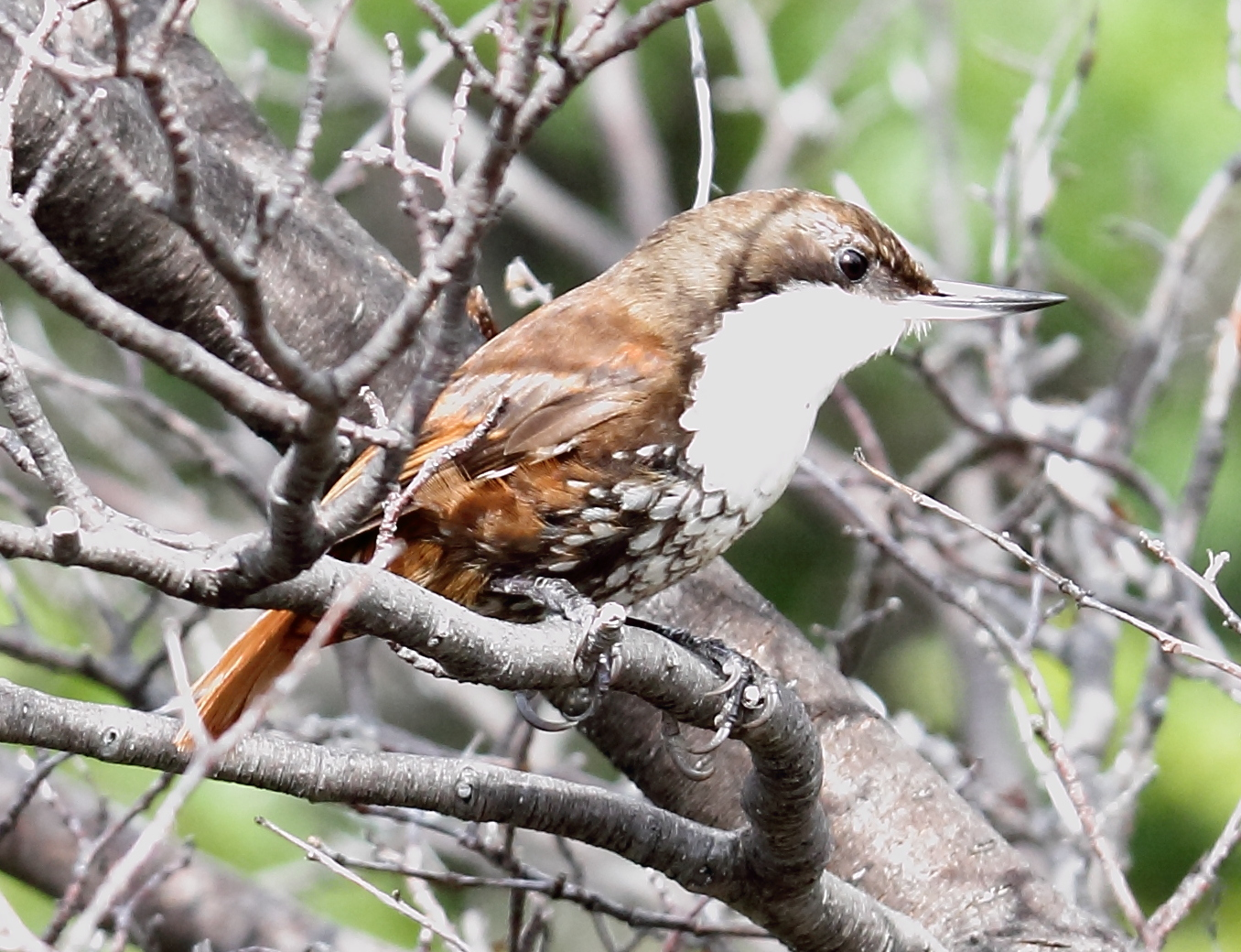
Adult white-throated treerunner.

The white-throated treerunner is 15–16 cm (5.9–6.3 in) long on average, with a weight between 20–27 grams (0.71–0.95 oz). It has an appearance reminiscent of the nuthatch, with its overall look and plumage, unlike other species in the Furnariidae. Wing chord is from 76–86 mm (3.0–3.4 in), tail is 52–65 mm (2.0–2.6 in), and torso from 20–23.7 mm (0.79–0.93 in). The iris is dark brown. It has a long beak, at around 16–23.8 mm (0.63–0.94 in) with a slight upward curve. Its upper mandible is dark gray and lower mandible a whitish-pale gray. The feet are dark gray, blackish or brown.

The species is easily recognized by its white throat, contrasting with its upper parts. Its face is blackish-brown and slightly darker than its head crown, which is a dull brown. The back is a paler chestnut-brown, pulling against the red rump and tail. The wing coverts are dark brown, with red or chestnut brown on the feather edges and tail end. The primaries are darker, the remiges black-brown with light edges and inner primaries marked with a short, light red wing bar. The tail is rounded, with rigid rectrices with shortened barbs ending in small spines up to 9 mm (0.35 in) long.

A large white zone covers the treerunner's cheek and throat, descending to the middle of the chest. The rest of the lower parts, to the undertail coverts, are made up of white feathers largely bordered with dark brown, giving an irregularly spotted appearance. Both sexes of adults look similar. The chick is distinguished by an ochre-striped crown and back, and often with blackish borders on the throat feathers.

== Ecology and behavior ==
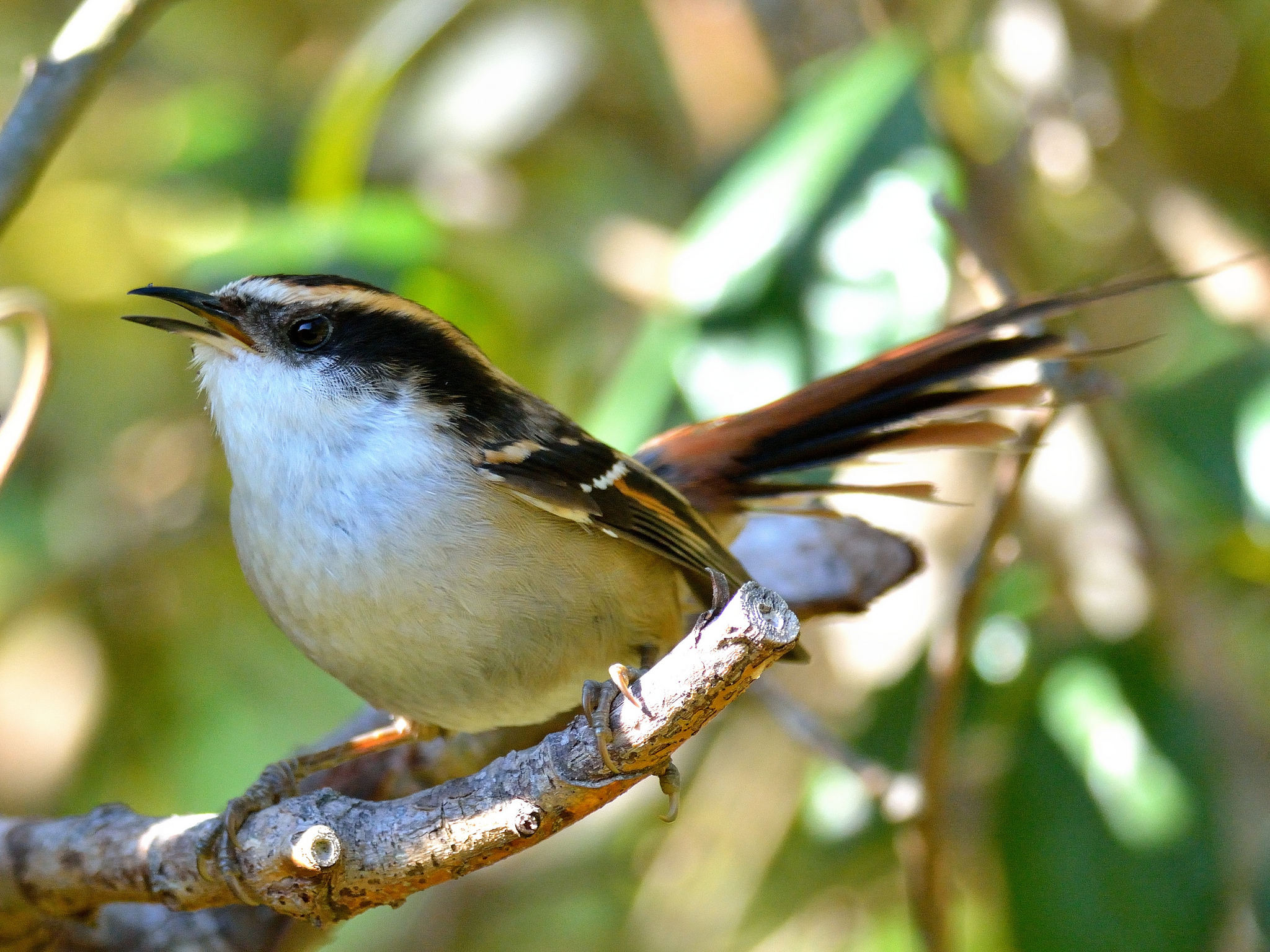
The white-throated treerunner may feed in flocks with other bird species, such as thorn-tailed rayadito.

=== Vocalizations ===
The white-throated treerunner gives off a short and piercing cry, evoking a rapid succession of water droplets. Its contact call is described as a loud, fast, metallic "kik-ik", "tsi-ik" or "tsik", which is repeated rapidly. The treerunner can also emit a sonorous "peet peet", and during flight, a dry "tic".

=== Food ===
Similar in behavior to nuthatches (Sitta spp.), the white-throated treerunner is a restless bird, moving in a jerky manner and changing direction rapidly. The bird may descend from trunks head first. It scours the trunks and large branches of old trees, often spiraling around the trunks, searching for small insects and their larvae in every crevice for food, sometimes tapping lightly with its bill, much like a woodpecker, or digging out larvae from under the bark with its bill. It may use its tail for support, or it may use its tail as a support for the insects. It may use their tail for support, but it also does a lot of tail-first browsing. It explores trunks quickly and spends more time foraging in smaller branches, looking for prey at the base of leaf petioles.

Its diet is little known, consisting of arthropods including adults and larvae of beetles, as well as diptera. A study conducted in the province of Osorno showed that the white-throated treerunner mainly forages on trees such as Coigüe (Nothofagus dombeyi), but also Neuquén Roble (N. obliqua), Ulmo (Eucryphia cordifolia), and more generally on dead trees, even when other tree and shrub species are available. These preferences could be explained by the structure of the bark and the greater abundance of accessible insects. In some locations, particularly on islands with no terrestrial predators, the species may also feed on the ground. Outside the breeding season, it may form mixed-species foraging flock with the thorn-tailed rayadito (Aphrastura spinicauda), as well as with the striped woodpecker (Veniliornis lignarius), and sometimes also with the fire-eyed diucon (Xolmis pyrope), Patagonian sierra finch (Phrygilus patagonicus) and the black-chinned siskin (Spinus barbatus).

=== Breeding ===
The white-throated treerunner nests in tree cavities. It may nest in the trunks of senescent or fire-damaged trees, but is not as successful at this task as other species such as woodpeckers and therefore also reuses existing cavities. Observations of antagonistic behavior by the woodpecker toward other species reusing tree cavities suggest that it competes with these birds in cavity use more than it provides them with new nesting sites by excavating its own hole. A study of the thorn-tailed rayadito to assess whether or not broadcast conspecific songs attracted individuals to a suitable nesting area showed that, on the contrary, cavity-nesting birds-including white-throated treerunners and house wrens-avoided competitive areas. The white-throated treerunner, however, readily uses nest boxes.

The nest cavity is usually between 3–8 mm (0.12–0.31 in), above the ground, and is 25–40 cm (9.8–15.7 in), deep. There is no lining other than the chips from the excavation, but a carpet of grasses and feathers has been reported once. The breeding season probably spans the southern spring and summer, with eggs laid in November-December and young hatching in December. The white-throated treerunner is thought to be monogamous, laying two to three eggs. Eggs preserved at the Natural History Museum in London and measured by English naturalist Eugene William Oates are approximately 21.5 mm–22 mm × 16.7 mm–17 mm (0.85 in–0.87 in × 0.66 in–0.67 in). Capture-mark-recapture data from 35 individuals in the Cape Horn Biosphere Reserve indicate a longevity of at least 3 years and 8 months.

== Distribution and habitat ==
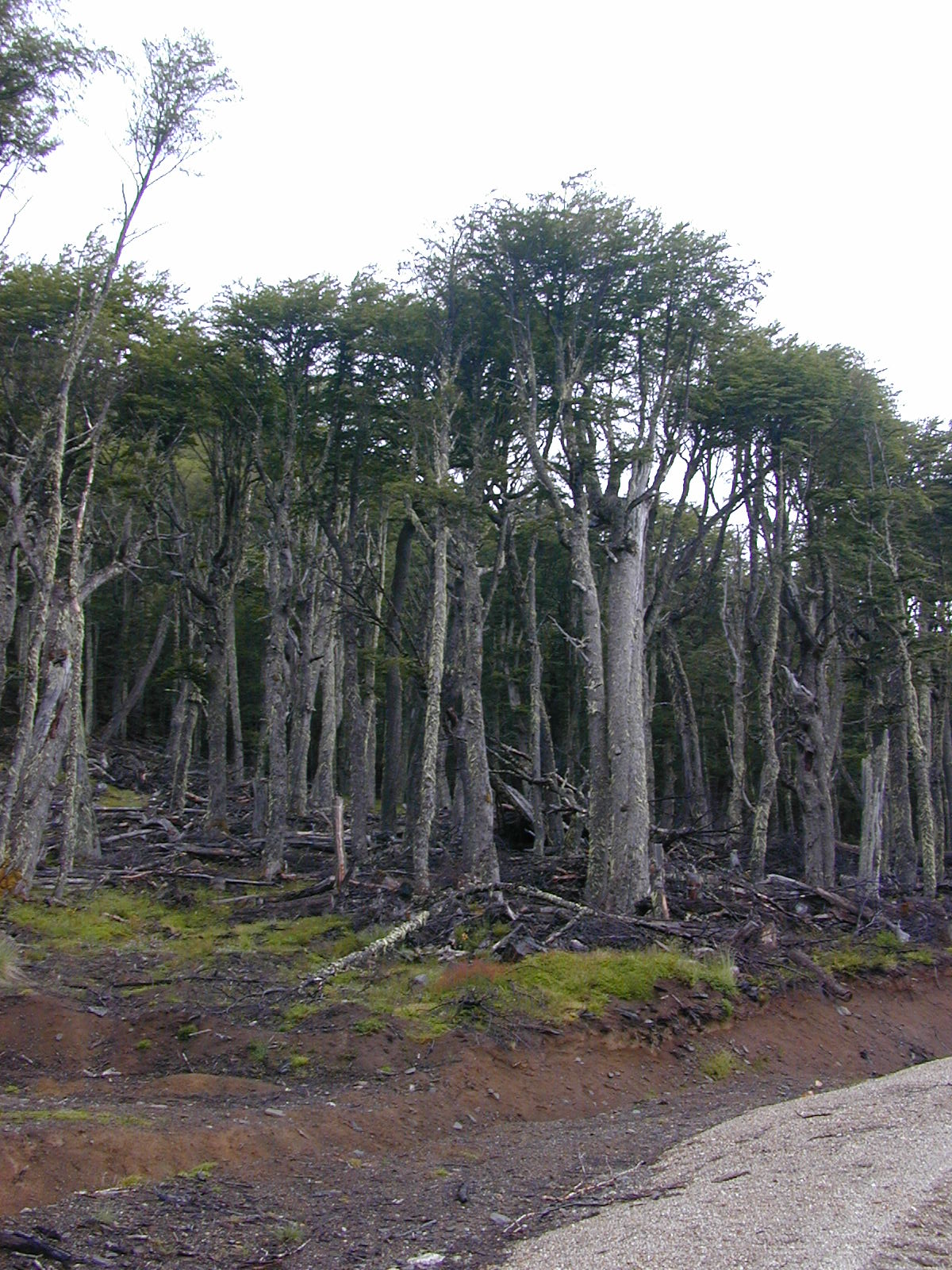
Lenga forest (Nothofagus pumilio) is a typical habitat of the white-throated treerunner.

This species lives in central and southern Chile and western Argentina, from Santiago and Mendoza to Tierra del Fuego. It is found in the south of its distribution in the southernmost forest in the world, on Horn Island. It lives from sea level to 1,200 m of altitude, populating forests with large trees, whether dense or not, but avoiding young forests. The white-throated treerunner seeks out forests dominated by "false beech" species of the genus Nothofagus. It exploits the trunks at mid-height of trees up to the top of the canopy as a small woodpecker would. The species is sedentary, but can be erratic outside the breeding season.

== In relationship with humans ==
=== In culture ===
The white-throated treerunner appears in some traditional Yahgan stories as tatajurj, where it accompanies women and collects epiphytic fungi of the genus Cyttaria (katran in Yagan) from the trunks of Magellanic Beech (N. betuloides), Lenga (N. pumilio), and Ñire (N. antarctica) trees.

=== Status and threats ===
The white-throated treerunner needs to have old senescent trees available for nesting, a specific and scarce habitat that deserves a conservation effort. However, it is quite common, and present in many protected areas such as Vicente Pérez Rosales National Park, Puyehue National Park, Nahuelbuta National Park and La Campana National Park in Chile, or Tierra del Fuego National Park in Argentina. The range of the white-throated treerunner is estimated at 470,000 km^{2} (180,000 sq mi) and its numbers are believed to be stable; thus, the species is considered of "least concern" by the International Union for Conservation of Nature.
