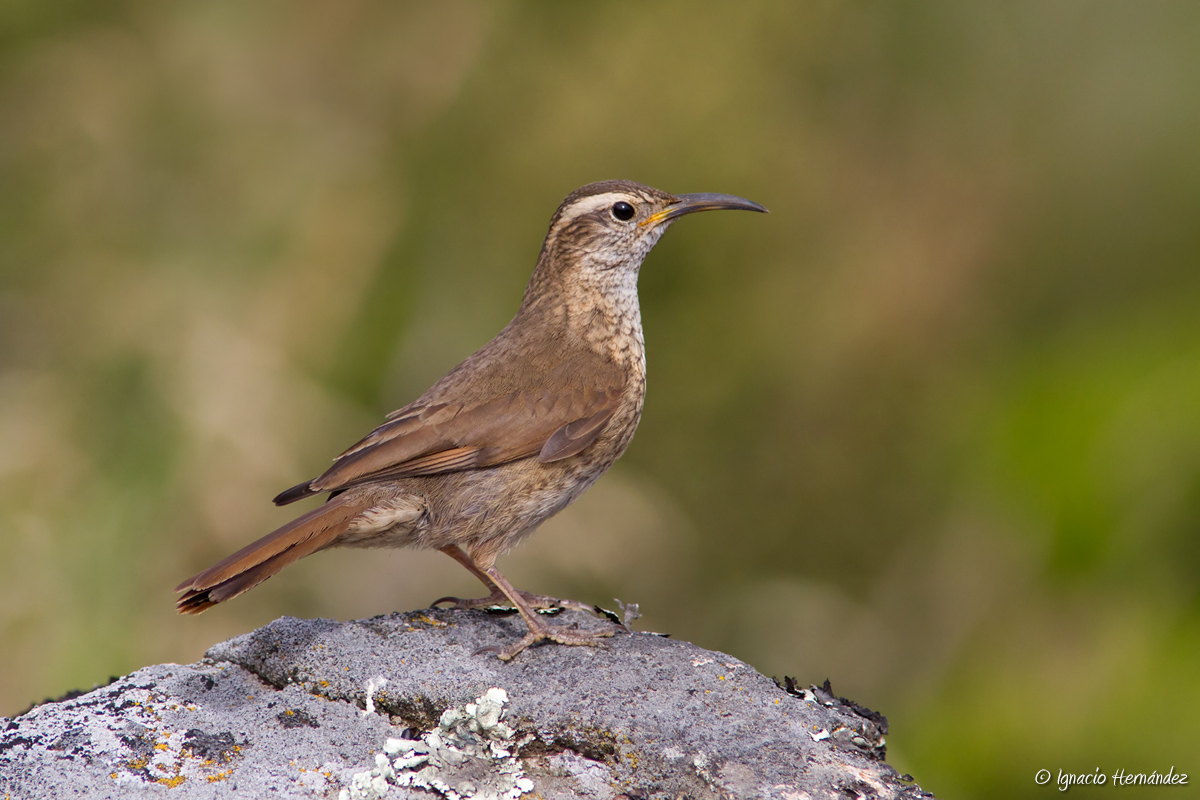

Conservation status
- Least Concern (IUCN 3.1)

Scientific classification
- Kingdom: Animalia
- Phylum: Chordata
- Class: Aves
- Order: Passeriformes
- Family: Furnariidae
- Genus: Upucerthia
- Species: U. saturatior

Binomial name
- Upucerthia saturatior W.E.D. Scott, 1900

Synonyms
- Upucerthia dumetaria saturatior

= Patagonian forest earthcreeper =

Species of bird

The Patagonian forest earthcreeper (Upucerthia saturatior), also known as the forest earthcreeper, is a species of bird in the Furnariinae subfamily of the ovenbird family Furnariidae. It is found in Argentina and Chile.

== Taxonomy and systematics ==
What is now the Patagonian forest earthcreeper was described in 1900 by W.E.D. Scott, but was long treated as a subspecies of the scale-throated earthcreeper. A 2009 paper provided the data to confirm it as a separate species.

The Patagonian forest earthcreeper is monotypic.

== Description ==
The Patagonian forest earthcreeper is 20 to 22 cm (7.9 to 8.7 in) long. It is a large earthcreeper with a medium-length and moderately decurved bill. The sexes' plumages are alike. Adults have a whitish supercilium on an otherwise grayish white and dark grayish brown face. Their crown is a dull dark grayish brown with some fainter mottling. Their nape, back, rump, and uppertail coverts are dark brownish gray with an olive tinge. Their tail's central feathers are dusky brown and the rest blackish brown. Their wings are grayish brown with dull rufous bases to the flight feathers. Their chin is whitish, their throat whitish with thin dark bars, their breast dark grayish with a brown scalloped appearance, their belly grayish, their flanks grayish brown, and their undertail coverts dull gray-brown. Their iris is dark brown, their bill blackish, and their legs and feet dark brown. Juveniles are similar to adults but with an even shorter bill.

== Distribution and habitat ==
The Patagonian forest earthcreeper is found in central Chile between Concepción and Valdivia provinces and in western Argentina between Neuquén and Chubut provinces. There are a few scattered records as far north in Chile as Santiago. It is found in Patagonia only in Argentina. It inhabits forest edges including the edges of clearings with the forest, and usually near bodies of water. It favors Nothofagus forest but inhabits other types as well. It is believed to spend the austral winter in dry deciduous forest and matorral near the Chilean coast. In elevation it occurs between 250 and 1,800 m (800 and 5,900 ft).

== Behavior ==
=== Movement ===
The Patagonian forest earthcreeper's movements have not been fully confirmed. However, evidence strongly suggests that it breeds only in Argentina and crosses the Andes to winter in Chile.

=== Feeding ===
The Patagonian forest earthcreeper's diet has not been described but is assumed to be larval and adult arthropods. It typically forages alone or in loose pairs, always on the ground, and usually near tall rees, around bushes, or in boggy ground at the forest's edge. It vigorously probes the earth for prey and sometimes turns over chunks of soil or stones. It often perches in trees when not feeding, and sometimes takes prey from the ground to a perch.

=== Breeding ===
Nothing is known about the Patagonian forest earthcreeper's breeding biology beyond that much evidence indicates it breeds in the austral summer and only in Argentina.

=== Vocalization ===
The Patagonian forest earthcreeper sometimes sings from a high perch. Its song is "1–2 sharp, short and lower-pitched initial notes followed by either a syncopated or a continuously delivered series of triplets...rendered 'p-p-tirik-tirik-tirik-tirik-tirik-tiruk' ". Its contact call is "a hollow 'pep' " that is given singly or in a series.

== Status ==
The IUCN has assessed the Patagonian forest earthcreeper as being of Least concern. It has a fairly large range but its population size is not known and is believed to be decreasing. No immediate threats have been identified. It is "generally considered to be reasonably numerous" throughout its range and occurs in several protected areas.
