= Beautiful treerunner =

Conservation status
- Near Threatened (IUCN 3.1)

Scientific classification
- Kingdom: Animalia
- Phylum: Chordata
- Class: Aves
- Order: Passeriformes
- Family: Furnariidae
- Genus: Margarornis
- Species: M. bellulus

Binomial name
- Margarornis bellulus Nelson, 1912

Species of bird

The beautiful treerunner (Margarornis bellulus) is a Near Threatened species of bird in the Furnariinae subfamily of the ovenbird family Furnariidae. It is endemic to Panama.

== Taxonomy and systematics ==
Some authors have proposed that the beautiful treerunner and the pearled treerunner (M. squamiger) are conspecific or sister species, but these treatments were disproven in a 2011 publication.

The beautiful treerunner is monotypic.

== Description ==
The beautiful treerunner is 14 to 15 cm (5.5 to 5.9 in) long and weighs 18 to 19 g (0.63 to 0.67 oz). The sexes have the same plumage. Adults have a buffish-white supercilium that extends to the nape, a dull reddish brown line behind the eye, dark brown ear coverts with whitish streaks, and a dark brown "moustache" with white spots that become stripes toward the neck. Their crown is olive brown and their upperparts and wing coverts warm olive-brown. Their flight feathers are dark fuscous with tawny-ochraceous edges. Their tail is dull reddish brown; the ends of the tail feathers lack barbs, giving a spiny appearance. Their throat is whitish and the rest of their underparts rufescent brown. Their upper breast has whitish oval spots with dark brown rims that become narrow stripes on the belly. Their iris is brown, their maxilla brownish, their mandible pinkish, and their legs and feet gray.

== Distribution and habitat ==
The beautiful treerunner has a disjunct distribution within Panama. It is found in the Serranía de Majé of Panamá Province and in several ranges in the extreme east of Darién Province. It inhabits montane evergreen forest, mostly at elevations between 1,350 and 1,600 m (4,400 and 5,200 ft) but in a few places as low as 900 m (3,000 ft).

== Behavior ==
=== Movement ===
The beautiful treerunner is a year-round resident throughout its range.

=== Feeding ===
The beautiful treerunner feeds on arthropods. It usually forages as part of a mixed-species feeding flock. It acrobatically moves through the forest's subcanopy, gleaning prey from branches and epiphytes, sometimes while hanging upside down.

=== Breeding ===
Nothing is known about the beautiful treerunner's breeding biology.

=== Vocalization ===
As of September 2023, xeno-canto and the Cornell Lab of Ornithology's Macaulay Library each had a single recording of a beautiful treerunner call and none of its song.

== Status ==
The IUCN has assessed the beautiful treerunner as Near Threatened. It has a very small range and an unknown population size, though the latter is believed to be stable. "Habitat in the region is being cleared and degraded for mining, agriculture and cultivation of coca", and because it is a high elevation species "it could be vulnerable to global climate change". All of its known locations in Darién Province are within Darién National Park.
