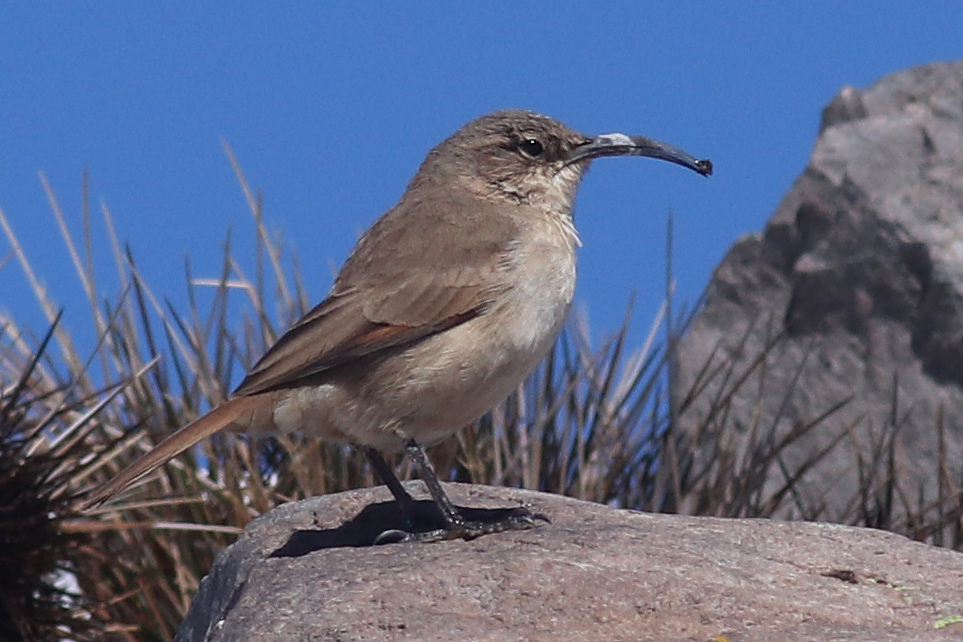

Scientific classification
- Kingdom: Animalia
- Phylum: Chordata
- Class: Aves
- Order: Passeriformes
- Family: Furnariidae
- Genus: Upucerthia
- Species: U. validirostris
- Subspecies: U. v. jelskii

Trinomial name
- Upucerthia validirostris jelskii (Cabanis, 1874)

Synonyms
- Upucerthia jelskii

= Plain-breasted earthcreeper =

Subspecies of bird

The plain-breasted earthcreeper (Upucerthia validirostris jelskii) is a bird in the family Furnariidae. It is found in Argentina, Bolivia, Chile, and Peru. Its natural habitats are subtropical or tropical high-altitude shrubland and subtropical or tropical high-altitude grassland. It has been lumped together with the buff-breasted earthcreeper based on song, continuous song, duet, and call.

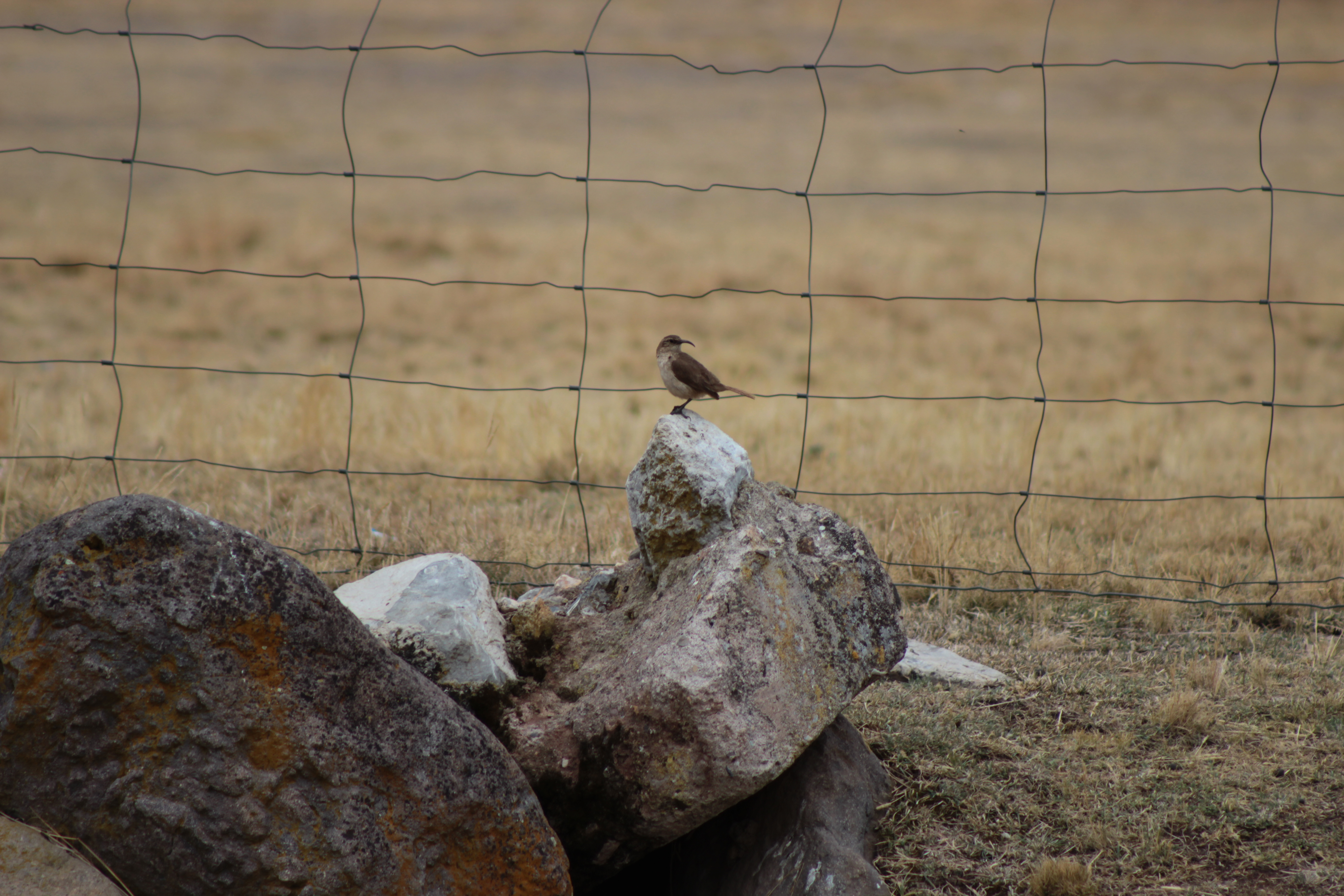
Marcapomacocha lagoon, Junin, Peru

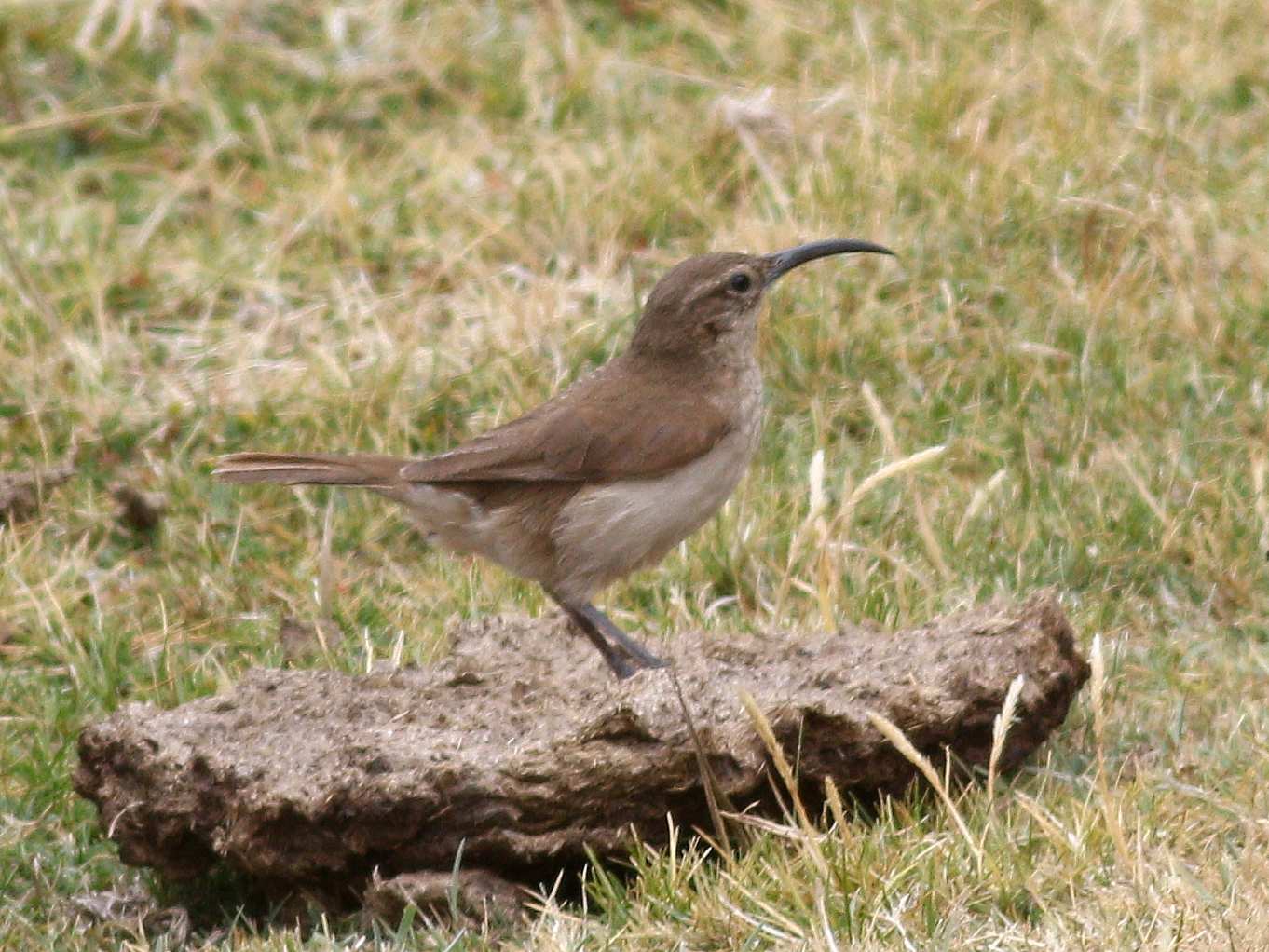
Lauricocha Province, Peru
