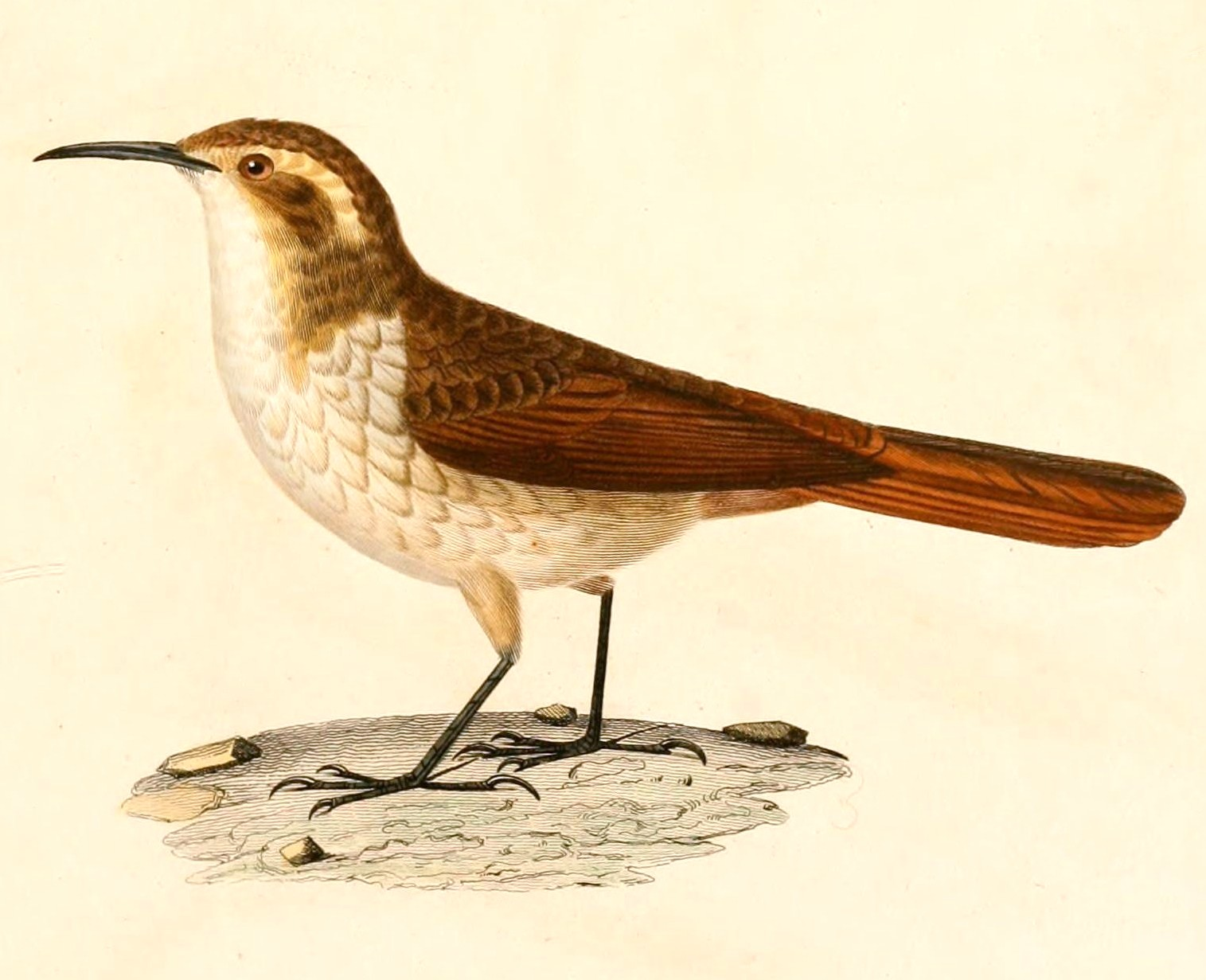
- Rock earthcreeper (Ochetorhynchus andaecola)

Scientific classification
- Kingdom: Animalia
- Phylum: Chordata
- Class: Aves
- Order: Passeriformes
- Family: Furnariidae
- Genus: Ochetorhynchus; Meyen, 1834

Type species
- Ochetorhynchus ruficaudus Meyen, 1834

Species
- Ochetorhynchus andaecola Ochetorhynchus ruficaudus Ochetorhynchus phoenicurus Ochetorhynchus melanurus

= Ochetorhynchus =

Genus of birds

Ochetorhynchus is a genus of earthcreepers, birds in the family Furnariidae. They are found in open to semi-open habitats in Chile, Argentina, Bolivia and Peru.

The genus contains the following species:

- Rock earthcreeper, Ochetorhynchus andaecola – formerly in genus Upucerthia.
- Straight-billed earthcreeper, Ochetorhynchus ruficaudus – formerly in genus Upucerthia.
- Band-tailed earthcreeper, Ochetorhynchus phoenicurus – formerly in monotypic genus Eremobius.
- Crag chilia, Ochetorhynchus melanurus – formerly in monotypic genus Chilia.
