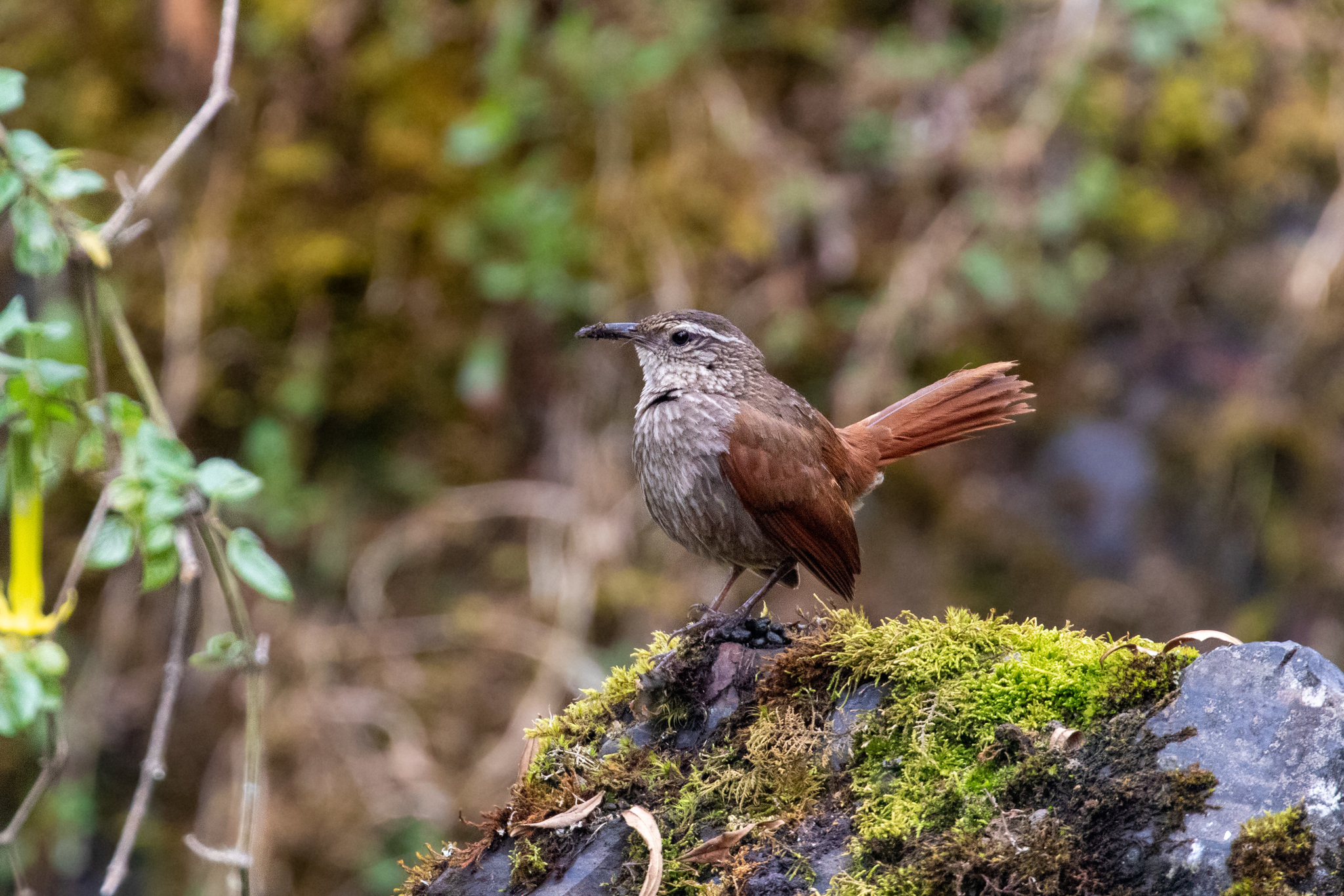

Conservation status
- Least Concern (IUCN 3.1)

Scientific classification
- Kingdom: Animalia
- Phylum: Chordata
- Class: Aves
- Order: Passeriformes
- Family: Furnariidae
- Genus: Geocerthia; Chesser, RT, & Claramunt, 2009
- Species: G. serrana

Binomial name
- Geocerthia serrana (Taczanowski, 1875)

Synonyms
- Upucerthia serrana

= Striated earthcreeper =

Species of bird

The striated earthcreeper (Geocerthia serrana) is a species of bird in the Furnariinae subfamily of the ovenbird family Furnariidae. It is endemic to Peru.

== Taxonomy and systematics ==
The striated earthcreeper was long placed in genus Upucerthia with several other earthcreepers. Genetic studies in the early 2000s refuted that placement and genus Geocerthia was created for it.

The striated earthcreeper has two subspecies, the nominate G. s. serrana (Taczanowski, 1875) and G. s. huancavelicae (Morrison, ARG, 1938).

== Description ==
The striated earchcreeper is 18 to 20.5 cm (7.1 to 8.1 in) long and weighs 41 to 52 g (1.4 to 1.8 oz). It is a large earthcreeper with long slightly decurved bill. The sexes' plumages are alike. Adults of the nominate subspecies have a whitish buff supercilium. Their crown is dusky brown with narrow whitish buff streaks on the forehead. The sides of their neck and their back are dark brown; the neck has thin whitish buff streaks. Their rump is dark rufous brown. Their tail is dull rufous; sometimes the central pair of feathers are browner. Their wings are rufous. Their throat is dirty white with some dusky scaling and their breast and belly dull gray brown or olive brown with whitish buff streaks. Their iris is any of several dark shades of brown, their bill black or horn, and their legs and feet gray or brown. Juveniles have a scaled appearance on their breast and faint bars on their upper belly. Subspecies G. s. huancavelicae has much darker upperparts than the nominate, and darker and grayer underparts with little warm brown.

== Distribution and habitat ==
The nominate subspecies of the striated earthcreeper is found in the Andes of northern and central Peru from the Department of Cajamarca south to the departments of Lima and Junín. Subspecies G. s. huancavelicae is found only in the southern Peruvian Andes of the Department of Huancavelica.

The striated earthcreeper inhabits areas of denser woody vegetation than most other earthcreepers. It mostly occurs in arid montane scrublands, on rocky slopes with bushes, and in Polylepis woodlands. In elevation it mostly ranges between 3,000 and 4,600 m (9,800 and 15,100 ft) but occurs locally below that.

== Behavior ==
=== Movement ===
The striated earthcreeper is a year-round resident throughout its range.

=== Feeding ===
Little is known about the striated earthcreeper's diet though arthropods appear to be its major component. It typically forages singly or in pairs. It does most of its foraging on the ground by probing, gleaning, and flicking aside leaf litter. In Polylepis woodlands it also probes bark crevices for prey.

=== Breeding ===
Little is known about the striated earthcreeper's breeding biology. Its breeding season appears to span at least October to January. Only one nest has been described; it was in a burrow in a pebbly earth bank. The species has also nested in adobe walls.

=== Vocalization ===
One publication described the striated earthcreeper's song as "a harsh slowing trill introduced by 3 notes, the 1st longest, keep kip kip trrrrrrrrr-r-r r, lasting c. 4 s" and its call as "a single, drawn-out, somewhat wheezy weeeee". Another describes the song as "a dry accelerating-decelerating trill: tp tp tp trr'r'r'r'r'r'e'e'e'e'e'r'r" and the call as "a scratchy djer-djer-djer-djer-djree".

== Status ==
The IUCN has assessed the striated earthcreeper as being of Least Concern. It has a large range, and though its population size is not known it is believed to be stable. No immediate threats have been identified. "Human activity has little direct effect on the Striated Earthcreeper, other than the local effects of habitat destruction, such as from overgrazing."
