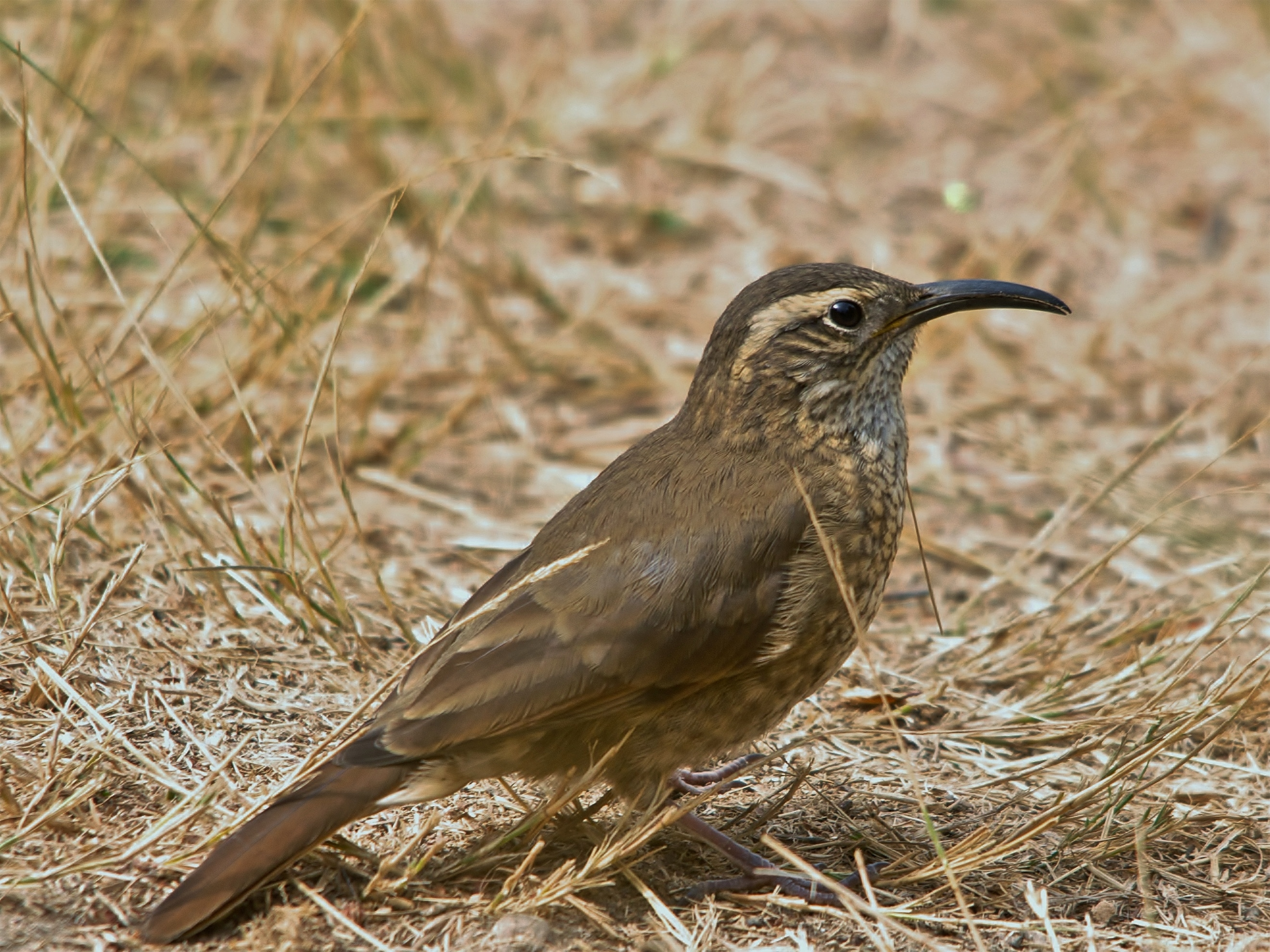

Conservation status
- Least Concern (IUCN 3.1)

Scientific classification
- Kingdom: Animalia
- Phylum: Chordata
- Class: Aves
- Order: Passeriformes
- Family: Furnariidae
- Genus: Upucerthia
- Species: U. dumetaria

Binomial name
- Upucerthia dumetaria Geoffroy Saint-Hilaire, 1832

= Scale-throated earthcreeper =

Species of bird

The scale-throated earthcreeper (Upucerthia dumetaria) is a species of bird in the Furnariinae subfamily of the ovenbird family Furnariidae. It is found in Argentina, Bolivia, Chile, Peru, and possibly Uruguay.

== Taxonomy and systematics ==
The scale-throated earthcreeper has three subspecies, the nominate U. d. dumetaria (Geoffroy Saint-Hilaire, 1832), U. d. peruana (Zimmer, JT, 1954), and U. d. hypoleuca (Reichenbach, 1853). What is now the Patagonian forest earthcreeper (U. saturatior) was considered a fourth subspecies until about 2009.

== Description ==
The scale-throated earthcreeper is 20 to 22 cm (7.9 to 8.7 in) long and weighs 37 to 55.5 g (1.3 to 2.0 oz). It is a large earthcreeper with a long and very decurved bill. The sexes' plumages are alike. Adults of the nominate subspecies have a whitish supercilium on an otherwise grayish white and dark grayish brown face. Their crown is a dull dark grayish brown with some fainter mottling. Their nape, back, rump, and uppertail coverts are uniform dull brownish gray. Their tail's central feathers are dull grayish brown and the rest blackish brown with dull rufous tips; the amount of rufous increases from inner to outer feathers. Their wings are grayish brown with paler edges and dull rufous bases to the flight feathers. Their chin is whitish, their throat whitish with thin dark bars, their breast dark grayish brown with a black scalloped appearance, their belly whitish, their flanks grayish brown, and their undertail coverts dull gray-brown. Their iris is dark brown, their bill blackish, and their legs and feet dark brown. Juveniles have fine streaks on their forehead and back, and more extensive scalloping on their underparts than adults. Subspecies U. d. hypoleuca is similar to the nominate but with more rufous upperparts and more buffy underparts. U. d. peruana is similar to hypoleuca but has a longer bill, is slightly lighter, and has less rufous in its wings.

== Distribution and habitat ==
The nominate subspecies of the scale-throated woodcreeper is the southernmost. It is found in far southern Chile, and throughout Argentina at different times of the year. U. d. hypoleuca is found in western Bolivia, central Chile, and western Argentina. U. d. peruana is known only from two specimens collected in the 1950s in far southeastern Peru's Department of Puno. The species inhabits puna grassland and arid scrublands in both the lowlands and Andes. It favors rocky grassland and also shrubby slopes and shrub–steppe broken by ravines and rock outcrops. In elevation it ranges as high as 4,000 m (13,000 ft).

== Behavior ==
=== Movement ===
Most populations of the scale-throated earthcreeper are year-round residents. Those in Tierra del Fuego and the far southern mainland are believed to migrate as far north as northern Argentina and possibly southern Uruguay. (The South American Classification Committee of the American Ornithological Society has only undocumented sight records from Uruguay, so it classes the species as hypothetical in that country.)

=== Feeding ===
The scale-throated earthcreeper's feeds on arthropods. It usually forages by itself, by probing and gleaning from the ground.

=== Breeding ===
The scale-throated earthcreeper breeds during the austral summer including at least October to December. It is thought to be monogamous. It usually nests at the end of a tunnel it excavates in an earth bank or in sloping ground, and floors the nest chamber with grasses. It has also been documented nesting in a hole in a human structure and in crevices in rocks. The clutch size is two to four eggs. The incubation period, time to fledging, and details of parental care are not known.

=== Vocalization ===
The scale-throated earthcreeper often sings from the top of a bush. Its song is " 'chippy, chippy, chippy, chip' or 'pli-pli-pli-pli-pli...' increasing slightly in pitch and sometimes descending towards the end". Its calls include "a wheezy 'keet' or squeaky-sounding 'keep',...and sharp, dry 'dzit' ".

== Status ==
The IUCN has assessed the scale-throated earthcreeper as being of Least Concern. It has a large range but its population size is not known and is believed to be decreasing. No immediate threats have been identified. It is considered fairly common in the southern part of its range and very rare in the northern part. Its "[h]abitat is reasonably safe from anthropogenic disturbances, overgrazing being the only potential threat".
