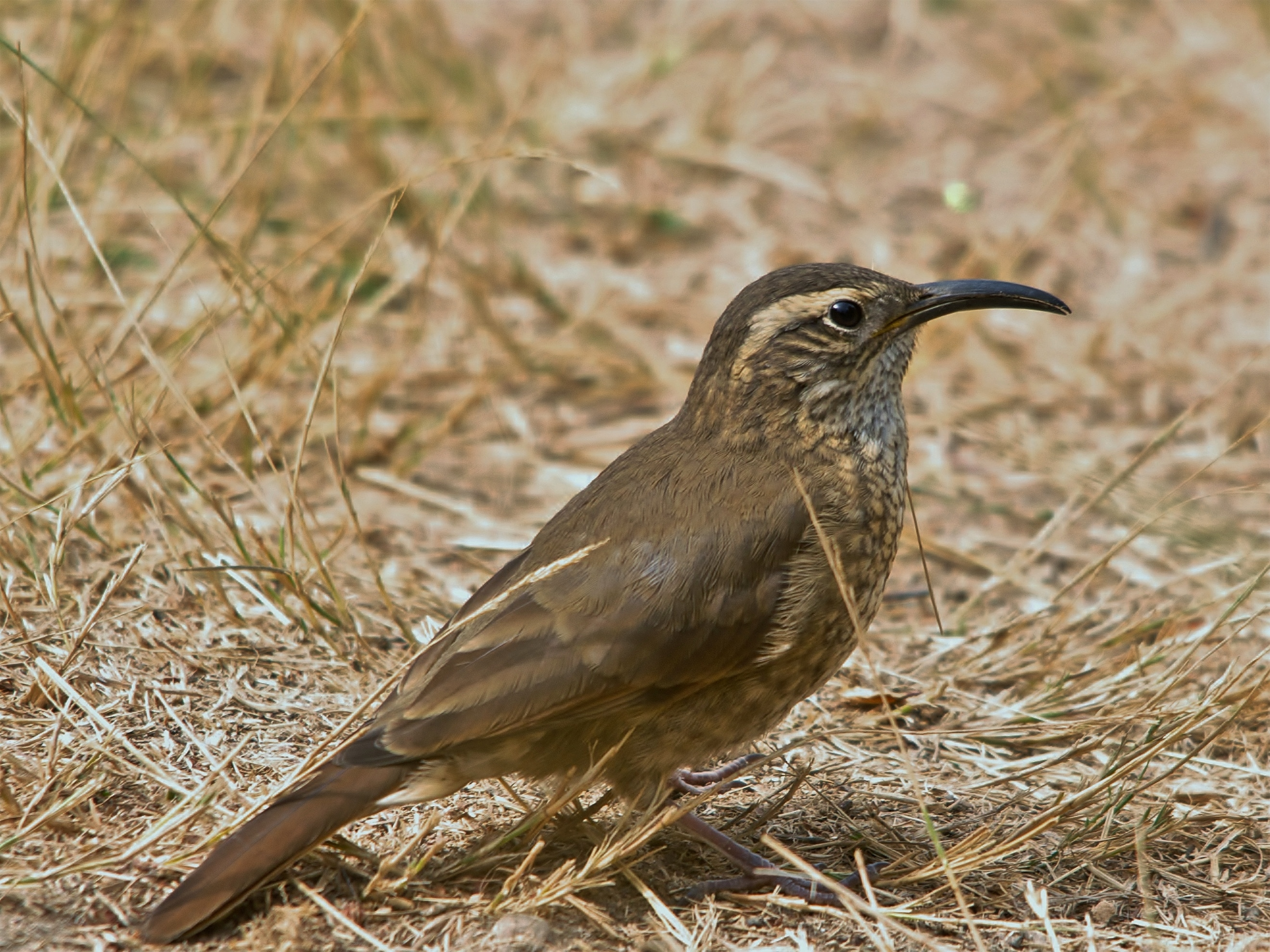
- Scale-throated earthcreeper (Upucerthia dumetaria)

Scientific classification
- Kingdom: Animalia
- Phylum: Chordata
- Class: Aves
- Order: Passeriformes
- Family: Furnariidae
- Genus: Upucerthia; I. Geoffroy Saint-Hilaire, 1832

Type species
- Upucerthia dumetaria Geoffroy Saint-Hilaire, 1832

= Upucerthia =

Genus of birds

Upucerthia is a genus of bird in the family Furnariidae.

== Taxonomy and etymology ==
Upucerthia is a genus of bird in the family Furnariidae. Established by French zoologist Isidore Geoffroy Saint-Hilaire in 1832, it contains four species known as earthcreepers. Genetic studies done in the early 2000s indicated that the genus as it stood at that time was highly polyphyletic, with species representing four distinct clades. As a result, a total of five former species were moved to other genera. The rock earthcreeper and the straight-billed earthcreeper were moved to the genus Ochetorhynchus. The Bolivian earthcreeper and the Chaco earthcreeper were moved to the genus Tarphonomus, and the striated earthcreeper was moved into the monotypic genus Geocerthia.

The genus name is a portmanteau of the genus names Upupa (for the hoopoes) and Certhia (for the treecreepers).

== List of species ==
The following are species recognized by the International Ornithologists' Union as being members of this genus.

- Scale-throated earthcreeper (Upucerthia dumetaria)
- Patagonian forest earthcreeper (Upucerthia saturatior)
- White-throated earthcreeper (Upucerthia albigula)
- Buff-breasted earthcreeper (Upucerthia validirostris)
  - Plain-breasted earthcreeper (Upucerthia validirostris jelskii)

The Patagonian forest earthcreeper, described as a distinct species in 1900 but soon lumped as a subspecies of the scale-throated earthcreeper, was designated as a distinct species again in the early 2000s. This determination was based on differences in its morphology, song, breeding habitat, and migration patterns.
