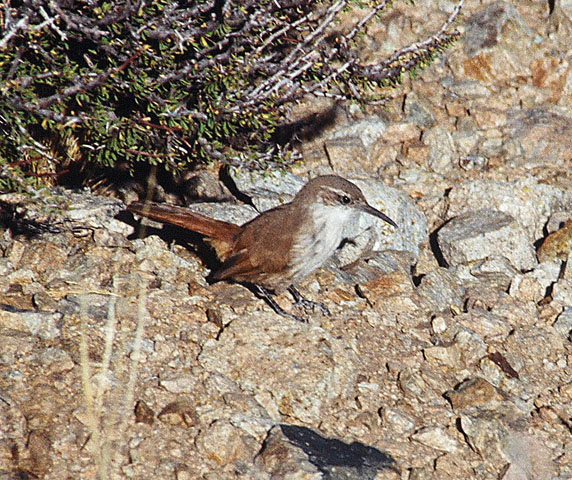

Conservation status
- Least Concern (IUCN 3.1)

Scientific classification
- Kingdom: Animalia
- Phylum: Chordata
- Class: Aves
- Order: Passeriformes
- Family: Furnariidae
- Genus: Upucerthia
- Species: U. albigula

Binomial name
- Upucerthia albigula Hellmayr, 1932

= White-throated earthcreeper =

Species of bird

The white-throated earthcreeper (Upucerthia albigula) is a species of bird in the Furnariinae subfamily of the ovenbird family Furnariidae. It is found in Chile and Peru.

== Taxonomy and systematics ==
The white-throated earthcreeper is monotypic.

== Description ==
The white-throated earthcreeper is 18 to 19.5 cm (7.1 to 7.7 in) long and weighs about 40 g (1.4 oz). It has a long, stout, strongly decurved bill. The sexes' plumages are alike. Adults have a wide buff supercilium. Their crown, back, rump, and uppertail coverts are brown; the crown is somewhat darker and grayer than the back. Their tail is dull rufous or rufescent brown. Their wing coverts are dull rufescent brown and their flight feathers dark rufous. Their throat is buffy white with faint dusky scaling, their breast pale tawny buff with faint dusky scaling, their belly pale tawny buff with a white center in the lower part, and their flanks tawny brown. Their iris is brown, their maxilla black, their mandible brownish gray or black, and their legs and feet black, dark brown, or dark gray.

== Distribution and habitat ==
The white-throated earthcreeper is found on the western slope of the Andes from Peru's Department of Lima south into Chile's Tarapacá Region. In elevation it occurs between 2,200 and 3,500 m (7,200 and 11,500 ft) in Peru and 3,000 and 3,800 m (9,800 and 12,500 ft) in Chile. It inhabits rather arid landscapes like rocky, steep-walled washes and nearby desert with clumps of cacti and scattered bushes. It also occurs along the edges of irrigated farmland where it meets the dryer natural habitat. It often is found along the rock walls separating fields.

== Behavior ==
=== Movement ===
The white-throated earthcreeper is a year-round resident throughout its range.

=== Feeding ===
Little is known about the white-throated earthcreeper's diet; it is assumed to be arthropods like that of other Upucerthia earthcreepers. Like them, it typically forages alone or in pairs, running and hopping on the ground and probing for prey.

=== Breeding ===
Almost nothing is known about the white-throated earthcreeper's breeding biology. Its breeding season includes November. Only one nest has been studied; it was a chamber lined with grass at the end of a long tunnel in the side of an earthen bluff. It contained two eggs.

=== Vocalization ===
The white-throated earthcreeper's song is "an accelerating, rising-falling series of liquid chipping notes: 'tup tup chi-chi-chi-chi-chi' ".

== Status ==
The IUCN has assessed the white-throated earthcreeper as being of Least Concern. It has a restricted range and its population size is not known and is believed to be decreasing. No immediate threats have been identified. It "generally is not considered to be rare" and "[t]he effects of human activity on the White-throated Earthcreeper are not known, but for the present appear to be small; ...however, overgrazing is a potential threat to this, and to other species found in arid montane scrub".
