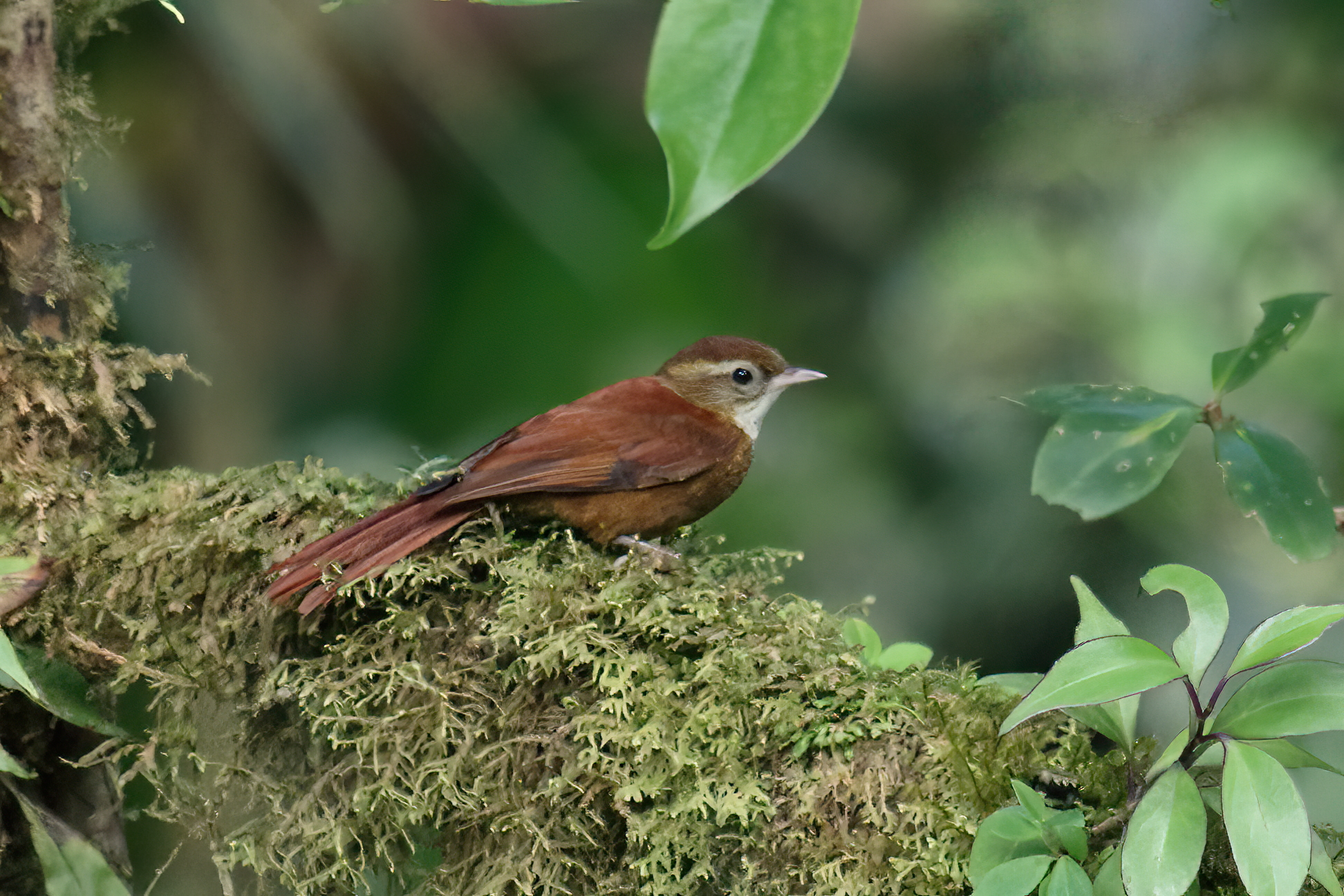

Conservation status
- Least Concern (IUCN 3.1)

Scientific classification
- Kingdom: Animalia
- Phylum: Chordata
- Class: Aves
- Order: Passeriformes
- Family: Furnariidae
- Genus: Margarornis
- Species: M. rubiginosus

Binomial name
- Margarornis rubiginosus Lawrence, 1865

= Ruddy treerunner =

Species of bird

The ruddy treerunner (Margarornis rubiginosus) is a passerine bird in the Furnariinae subfamily of the ovenbird family Furnariidae. It is found in Costa Rica and Panama.

== Taxonomy and systematics ==
The ruddy treerunner has two subspecies, the nominate M. r. rubiginosus (Lawrence, 1865) and M. r. boultoni (Griscom, 1924).

== Description ==
The ruddy treerunner is 15 to 16 cm (5.9 to 6.3 in) long and weighs 17 to 24 g (0.60 to 0.85 oz). The sexes have the same plumage. Adults of the nominate subspecies have a buffy whitish supercilium and eyering on an otherwise dull rufescent brown face. Their crown is dull reddish brown and they have a narrow, paler reddish, collar. Their upperparts and wing coverts are reddish chestnut. Their flight feathers are dark fuscous with rufescent edges. Their tail is a slightly paler reddish chestnut than the back; the ends of the tail feathers lack barbs, giving a spiny appearance. Their throat is whitish with a buffy white lower edge. Their breast is dull rufescent brown with pale buff "Vees" on its upper part and darker buff spots on the lower. Their belly is almost unmarked dull rufescent brown and their flanks and undertail coverts are a darker chestnut brown. Their iris is dark brown to brown, their maxilla brown to black, their mandible pinkish horn to pale pinkish white, and their legs and feet variable from grayish olive to dull pinkish to grayish brown. Juveniles have less distinct markings on their breast than adults. Subspecies M. r. boultoni has a deeper buff supercilium than the nominate, with slightly darker upperparts and deeper, richer, cinnamon underparts with smaller and fewer markings.

== Distribution and habitat ==
The ruddy treerunner is a bird of the highlands. It has a disjunct distribution. The nominate subspecies is found from the Cordillera de Guanacaste in northern Costa Rica south into Panama's Chiriquí Province. Subspecies M. r. boultoni is found in eastern Chiriquí and Veraguas Provinces. The species inhabits the interior and edges of montane evergreen forest at elevations between 1,200 and 3,000 m (3,900 and 9,800 ft).

== Behavior ==
=== Movement ===
The ruddy treerunner is a year-round resident throughout its range.

=== Feeding ===
The ruddy treerunner feeds on a wide variety of arthropods. It typically forages singly or in pairs, usually in mixed-species feeding flocks, and at any level of the forest. It acrobatically hitches up trunks and along limbs, gleaning prey from branches and epiphytes, often while hanging upside down.

=== Breeding ===
The ruddy treerunner's breeding season is not fully defined but appears to span from March to May. It builds an oval ball from moss, pieces of epiphyte, and ferns attached to a tree trunk and lines it with plant fibers and fern scales. Its tubular entrance is at its base. The clutch size, incubation period, and time to fledging are not known. It appears that both parents incubate the eggs, and both are known to care for nestlings.

=== Vocalization ===
The ruddy treerunner's call is "a thin, whistled tsit, usually in [a] rapid, irregular series". It also makes "metallic chirping notes and a descending trill".

== Status ==
The IUCN has assessed the ruddy treerunner as being of Least Concern. Though it has a restricted range, its estimated population of 20,000 to 50,000 mature individuals is believed to be stable. No immediate threats have been identified. It is considered fairly common to common. Though it occurs in some nominally protected areas, enforcement of conservation laws is lax.
