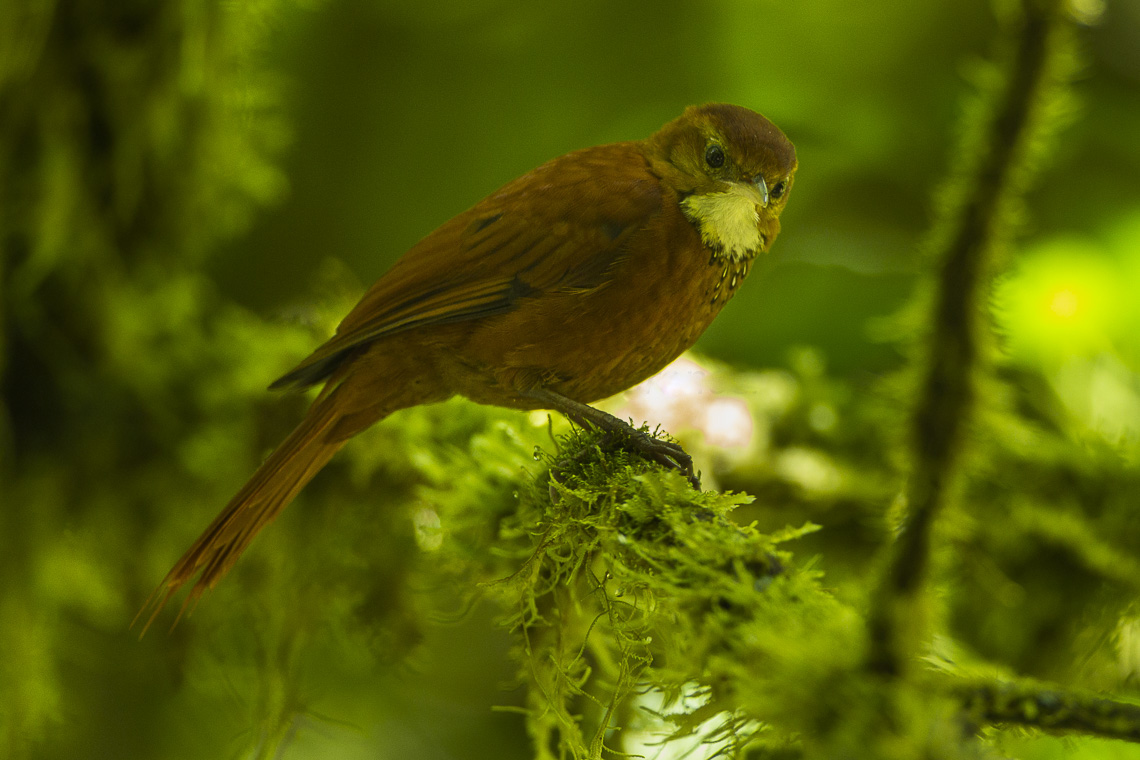

Conservation status
- Near Threatened (IUCN 3.1)

Scientific classification
- Kingdom: Animalia
- Phylum: Chordata
- Class: Aves
- Order: Passeriformes
- Family: Furnariidae
- Genus: Margarornis
- Species: M. stellatus

Binomial name
- Margarornis stellatus Sclater, PL & Salvin, 1873

= Star-chested treerunner =

Species of bird

The star-chested treerunner or fulvous-dotted treerunner (Margarornis stellatus) is a Near Threatened species of bird in the family Furnariidae. It is found in Colombia and Ecuador.

== Taxononomy and systematics ==
The star-chested treerunner is monotypic.

== Description ==
The star-chested treerunner is 13 to 15 cm (5.1 to 5.9 in) long and weighs 21 to 22 g (0.74 to 0.78 oz). The sexes have the same plumage. Adults have a wide but indistinct dull rufescent brownish supercilium, dull reddish brown ear coverts, and a more rufescent moustacial area. Their crown is dark reddish brown and their upperparts slightly paler. Their wing coverts are reddish brown, their primary coverts dark fuscous, and their flight feathers dark fuscous with dark rufescent edges. Their tail is dark reddish brown; the ends of the tail feathers lack barbs, giving a spiny appearance. Their throat is whitish. Their breast has a rufous-brown background; its upper part has a few rows of wide whitish spots with black surrounds and below them are several rows of smaller, more elongated black-edged white spots. The spots disappear by the lower breast. Their belly, flanks, and undertail coverts are plain rufous-brown. Their iris is dark brown, their maxilla horn to whitish horn with a browner base, their mandible horn, and their legs and feet grayish to brownish.

== Distribution and habitat ==
The star-chested treerunner is found in Colombia's Western and Central Andes from Chocó and Antioquia departments and south into western Ecuador as far as Pichincha Province. There is also a single record further south in Chimborazo Province. It inhabits montane evergreen forest, where it favors areas heavy with moss and epiphytes. In elevation it ranges from 1,200 to 1,900 m (3,900 to 6,200 ft) in Ecuador and from 1,200 to 2,200 m (3,900 to 7,200 ft) in Colombia.

== Behavior ==
=== Movement ===
The star-chested treerunner is a year-round resident throughout its range.

=== Feeding ===
The star-chested treerunner feeds on a variety of arthropods. It typically forages singly or in pairs, usually in mixed-species feeding flocks, and from the forest's mid-storey to its canopy. It acrobatically hitches up trunks and along limbs using its tail for support, and gleans prey from bark, moss, and epiphytes, often while hanging upside down.

=== Breeding ===
The star-chested treerunner's breeding season spans at least February to April, but nothing else is known about its breeding biology.

=== Vocalization ===
Though both xeno-canto and the Cornell Lab of Ornithology's Macaulay Library have several recordings of star-chested treerunner vocalizations, the species' song has not been described in words.

== Status ==
The IUCN has assessed the star-chested treerunner as Near Threatened. It has a restricted range (both in latitude and elevation) and an unknown population size that is believed to be decreasing. "It is primarily threatened by rapid and ongoing deforestation in the Chocó region, largely owing to intensive logging, human settlement, cattle grazing, mining and coca and oil palm cultivation, with destruction particularly severe within its elevational range." It is considered locally common in Colombia and very rare and local in Ecuador. It does occur in one protected area in Colombia.
