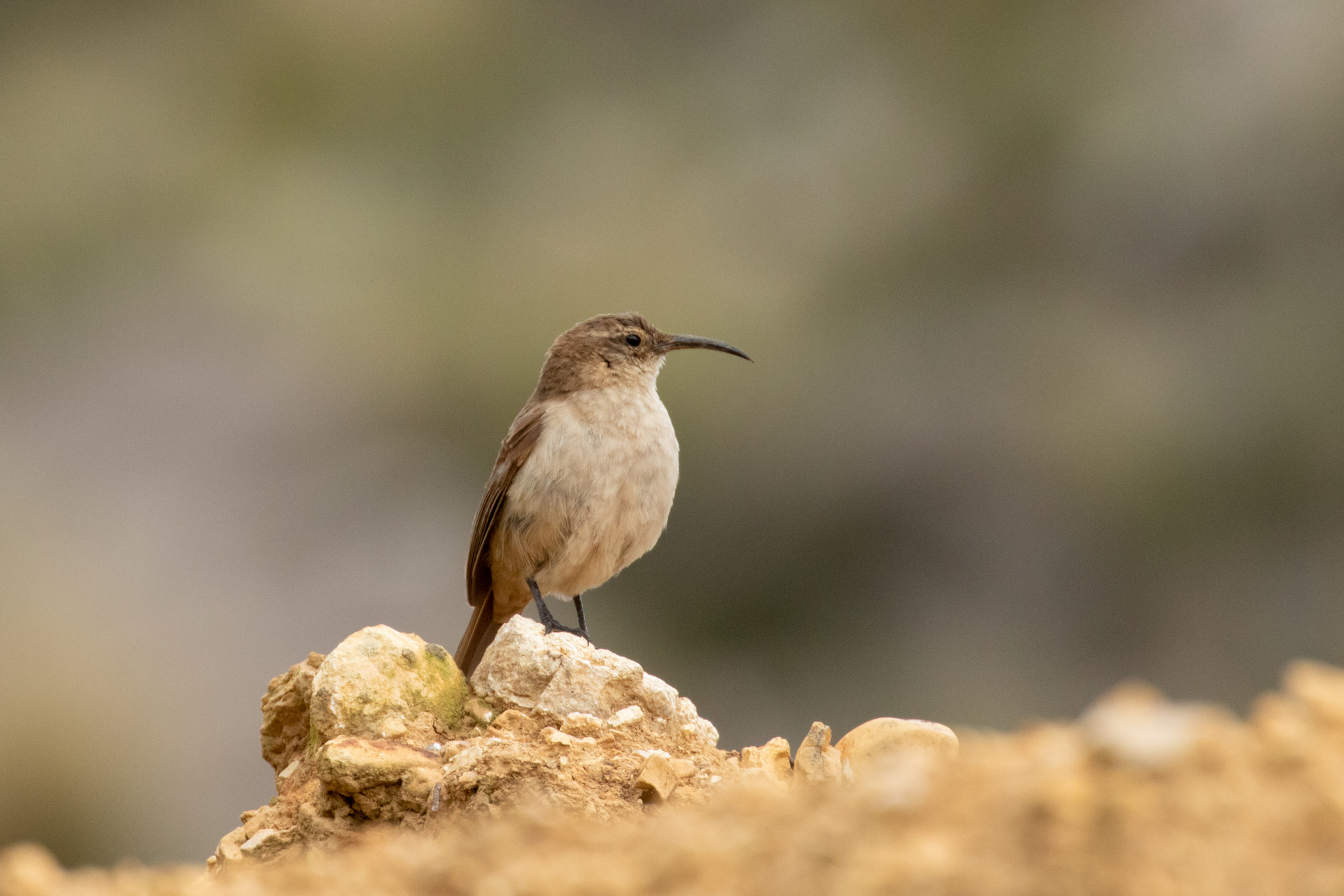

Conservation status
- Least Concern (IUCN 3.1)

Scientific classification
- Kingdom: Animalia
- Phylum: Chordata
- Class: Aves
- Order: Passeriformes
- Family: Furnariidae
- Genus: Upucerthia
- Species: U. validirostris

Binomial name
- Upucerthia validirostris (Burmeister, 1861)

= Buff-breasted earthcreeper =

Species of bird

The buff-breasted earthcreeper (Upucerthia validirostris) is a species of bird in the Furnariinae subfamily of the ovenbird family Furnariidae. It is found in Argentina, Bolivia, Chile, and Peru.

== Taxonomy and systematics ==
The buff-breasted earthcreeper has three subspecies, the nominate U. v. validirostris (Burmeister, 1861), U. v. saturata (Carriker, 1933), and U. v. jelskii (Cabanis, 1874). Before a 2013 publication, the buff-breasted earthcreeper was credited with an additional subspecies, and U. v. jelskii was treated as a separate species, the "plain-breasted" earthcreeper, with U. v. saturata as a subspecies of it. The paper resulted in the "collapse" of the two species with five subspecies into the current one-species, three-subspecies, model. Some authors suggest that further study is needed.

== Description ==
The buff-breasted earthcreeper is 17 to 21 cm (6.7 to 8.3 in) long and weighs 30 to 45 g (1.1 to 1.6 oz). It is a medium-sized earthcreeper with a long and strongly decurved bill. The sexes' plumages are alike. Adults of the nominate subspecies have a pale buffish white supercilium. Their crown, nape, back, rump, and uppertail coverts are dull brownish gray. Their tail is dark brown with increasing amounts of rufous from the central to the outer feathers. Their wings are mostly the same brownish gray as the back but with much rufous at the base of the primaries. Their throat is grayish white with brownish specks, their upper breast grayish white with a brownish scaly appearance, and their lower breast, belly, and undertail coverts plain light buffish. Their iris is dark brown, their bill blackish with a paler base, and their legs and feet blackish to dark brown. Juveniles are similar to adults but with more conspicuous markings on the breast. Subspecies U. v. jelskii has a smaller, shorter bill and less rufous in the wings than the nominate. U. v. saturata is much like jelskii but has grayer underparts.

== Distribution and habitat ==
Subspecies U. v. jelskii of the buff-breasted earthcreeper has by far the widest distribution. It is found in the Andes from Peru's Department of Lima south into Chile's Tarapacá Region and through western Bolivia into far northwestern Argentina's Jujuy Province. U. v. saturata is found in the western Andes of central Peru between the departments of Ancash and Pasco. The nominate U. v. validirostris is found in northwestern Argentina from Salta Province south to Mendoza Province and east into western Córdoba Province.

The buff-breasted earthcreeper inhabits puna grassland and arid montane scrublands. Within those landscapes if favors dry ravines with dense scrub and rocky and shrubby slopes; it shuns level ground.

== Behavior ==
=== Movement ===
The buff-breasted earthcreeper is a year-round resident throughout its range.

=== Feeding ===
The buff-breasted earthcreeper feeds on adult and larval arthropods. It usually forages singly but sometimes in pairs, probing in the ground and gleaning from it.

=== Breeding ===
The buff-breasted earthcreeper breeds in the austral summer, generally between November and March with some regional variation. It is assumed to be monogamous. It nests in a chamber at the end of a burrow in an earthen bank and sometimes in a crevice in rocks. It lines the nest chamber with grasses. The clutch size is two eggs. The incubation period, time to fledging, and details of parental care are not known.

=== Vocalization ===
The buff-breasted earthcreeper is not highly vocal. The nominate subspecies' song is "a long dry trill of c. 10 or more 'tyik' notes" and its call "a low 'chwit' ". The song of the other two subspecies is "a rich irregular trill 'drrrrrr…' lasting one to > 10 seconds, rising and then falling in pitch, accelerating and then decelerating". Their call is "a metallic 'click' or 'tyi-ík' ".

== Status ==
The IUCN has assessed the buff-breasted earthcreeper as being of Least Concern. It has a very large range but its population size is not known and is believed to be decreasing. No immediate threats have been identified. It is considered rare to locally fairly common. Its habitat is "reasonably safe from anthropogenic disturbances, except overgrazing by livestock".
