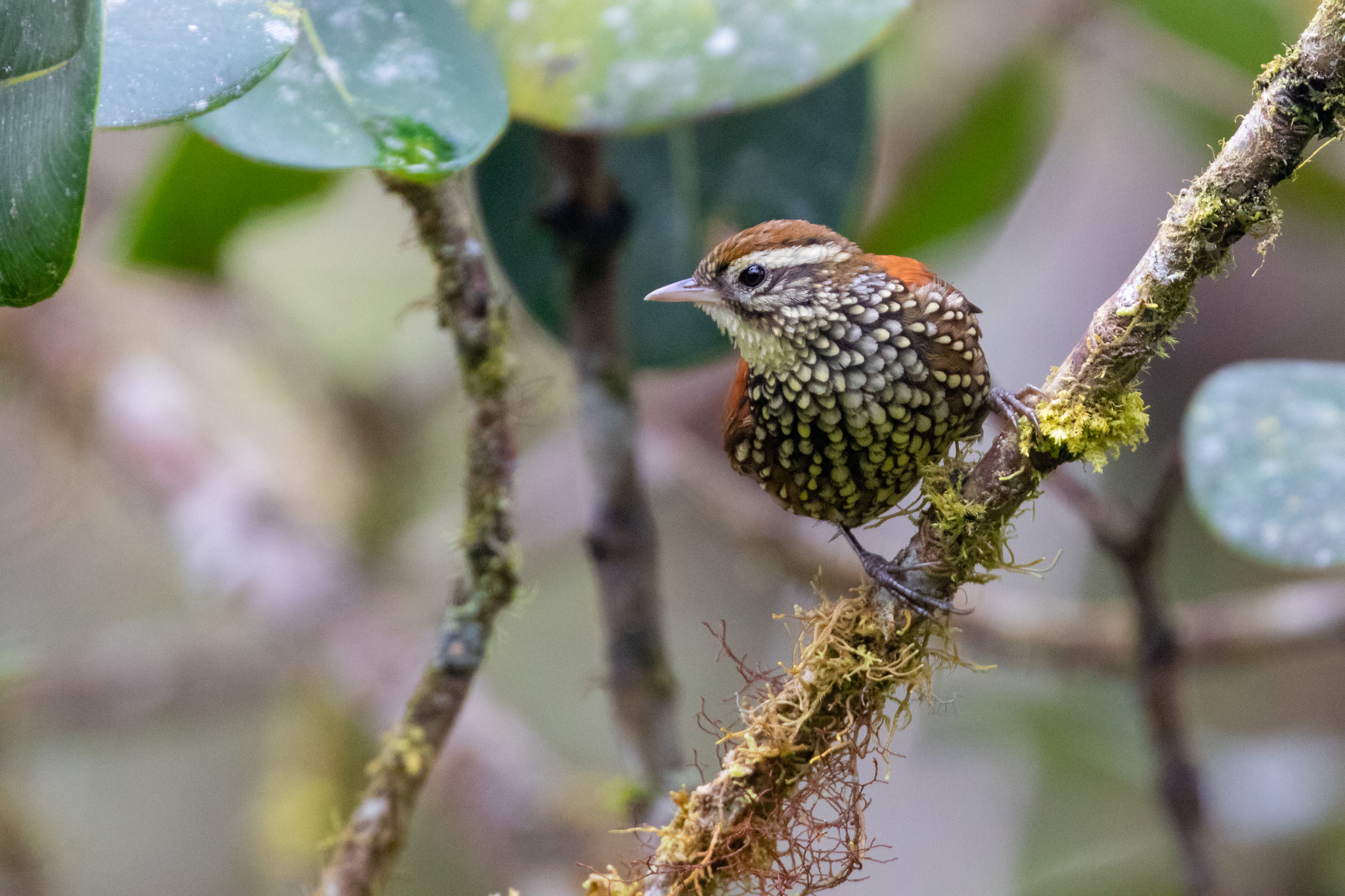

Conservation status
- Least Concern (IUCN 3.1)

Scientific classification
- Kingdom: Animalia
- Phylum: Chordata
- Class: Aves
- Order: Passeriformes
- Family: Furnariidae
- Genus: Margarornis
- Species: M. squamiger

Binomial name
- Margarornis squamiger (d'Orbigny & Lafresnaye, 1838)

= Pearled treerunner =

Species of bird

The pearled treerunner (Margarornis squamiger) is a species of bird in the Furnariinae subfamily of the ovenbird family Furnariidae. It is found in Bolivia, Colombia, Ecuador, Peru, Venezuela, and possibly Argentina.

== Taxonomy and systematics ==
The pearled treerunner has three subspecies, the nominate M. s. squamiger (d'Orbigny & Lafresnaye, 1838), M. s. perlatus (Lesson, 1844), and M. s. peruvianus (Cory, 1913).

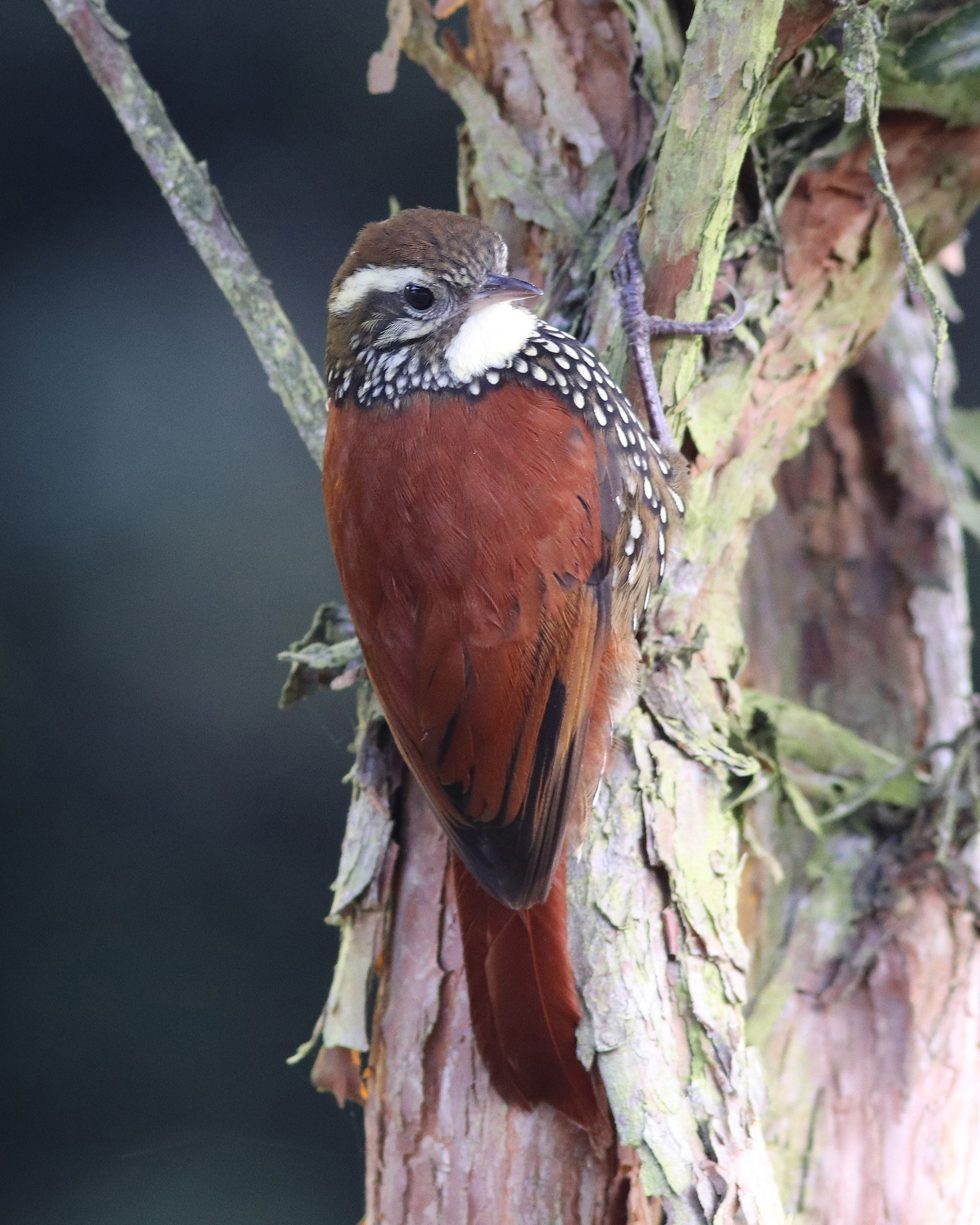
Pearled treerunner M. s. perlatus in Yanacocha, Ecuador

== Description ==
The pearled treerunner is 15 to 16 cm (5.9 to 6.3 in) long and weighs 14 to 19 g (0.49 to 0.67 oz). The sexes have the same plumage. Adults of the nominate subspecies have a well-defined yellowish buff supercilium that extends to the nape, a dull reddish brown line behind the eye, dull yellowish buff and dark brown ear coverts, and a dark brown moustacial area with tiny whitish spots that become streaks to the rear. Their forehead is dark brownish with pale rufous streaks and their crown dark reddish brown. Their collar is dull rufescent brown with black-outlined yellowish buff streaks. Their back, rump, and uppertail coverts are bright reddish brown. Their wing coverts are bright reddish brown, their primary coverts dark fuscous brown, and their flight feathers darker fuscous brown with rufescent edges. Their tail is bright reddish brown; the ends of the tail feathers lack barbs, giving a spiny appearance. Their throat is bright buff-yellow. Their breast and belly have a rufescent background. Their upper breast is dense with oval yellowish spots that have dark browish outlines; the spots become stretched out and less distinct by the lower breast and continue onto the belly. Their flanks are darker rufescent than the belly, with longer spots, and their undertail coverts are rufescent brown with a few blackish-edged buff-yellowish streaks. Their iris is brown to dark brown, their maxilla black to gray, their mandible whitish horn to purplish pink (sometimes with a dark tip), and their legs and feet brownish gray to dark brown. Juveniles have dusky tips on their throat feathers and a less regular pattern on their breast than adults.

Subspecies M. s. peruvianus is quite different from the nominate. It has a paler yellow supercilium, less rufous and more heavily streaked ear coverts, an olive-brown crown, and much less spotting on the underparts. M. s. perlatus is similar to peruvianus, but with a whitish supercilium and whiter spotting on the underparts.

== Distribution and habitat ==
The subspecies of the pearled treerunner are found thus:

- M. s. perlatus: from western Venezuela's Serranía del Perijá and Andes south through all three of Colombia's Andean ranges and the Andes of Ecuador into northern Peru's Piura and Cajamarca departments
- M. s. peruvianus: the Andes of Peru south of the Marañón River from the departments of Cajamarca and Amazonas south to the Department of Cuzco
- M. s. squamiger: the Andes from southern Peru's Department of Puno south into Bolivia as far as Santa Cruz Department

A single sight record in northern Argentina's Salta Province leads the South American Classification Committee of the American Ornithological Society to call the species hypothetical in that country.

The pearled treerunner primarily inhabits montane evergreen forest and elfin forest, and also occurs locally in Polylepis woodland and secondary forest. It favors tracts heavy with moss and epiphytes. In elevation it mostly ranges between 2,500 and 3,500 m (8,200 and 11,500 ft) but occurs as low as 1,500 m (4,900 ft) and as high as 3,800 m (12,500 ft).

== Behavior ==
=== Movement ===
The pearled treerunner is a year-round resident throughout its range.

=== Feeding ===
The pearled treerunner feeds on a variety of arthropods. It typically forages in pairs or small groups, commonly in mixed-species feeding flocks, and from the forest's mid-storey to its canopy. It acrobatically hitches up trunks and along limbs using its tail for support. It gleans prey mostly from moss and epiphytes, less often from bark and dead leaves, and often while hanging upside down.

=== Breeding ===
The pearled treerunner's breeding season has not been fully defined but apparently spans at least from December to June. It is thought to be monogamous. It forms moss into a ball-shaped nest with a side entrance, placed under a limb or rock. Nothing else is known about its breeding biology.

=== Vocalization ===
The pearled treerunner is not highly vocal. Its song is "a rapid series of high-pitched, thin 'tick' notes,". Its calls are "a single high-pitched 'tick' or 'tsit' [and a] short trill, 'trrrt-trrrt' ".

== Status ==
The IUCN has assessed the pearled treerunner as being of Least Concern. It has a very large range, and though its population size is not known it is believed to be stable. No immediate threats have been identified. It is considered fairly common to common and occurs in several protected areas. It "[t]olerates at least mild forest fragmentation and disturbance".
