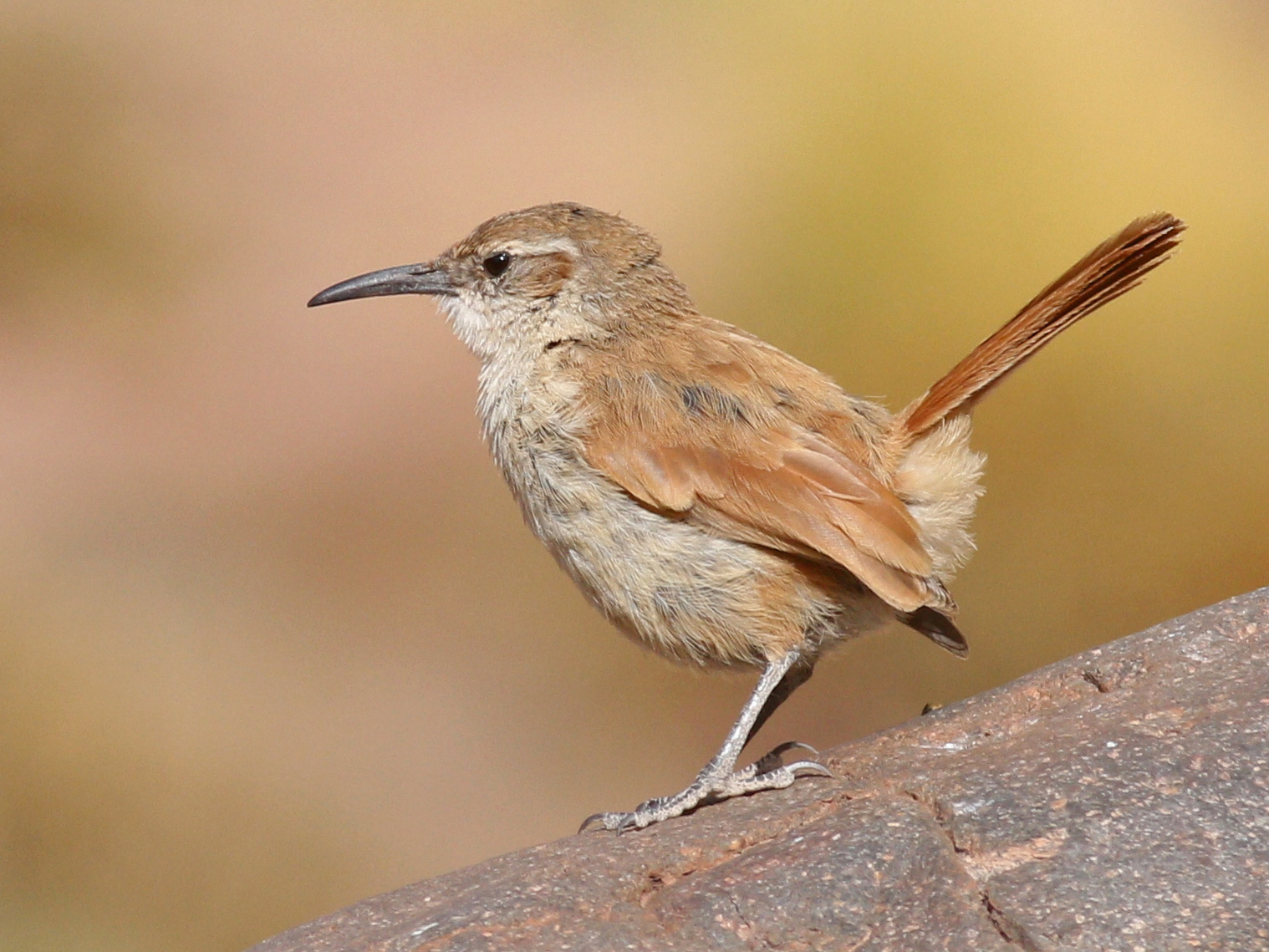

Conservation status
- Least Concern (IUCN 3.1)

Scientific classification
- Kingdom: Animalia
- Phylum: Chordata
- Class: Aves
- Order: Passeriformes
- Family: Furnariidae
- Genus: Ochetorhynchus
- Species: O. andaecola

Binomial name
- Ochetorhynchus andaecola (d'Orbigny & Lafresnaye, 1838)

Synonyms
- Upucerthia andaecola (d'Orbigny & Lafresnaye, 1838)

= Rock earthcreeper =

Species of bird

The rock earthcreeper (Ochetorhynchus andaecola) is a species of bird in the Furnariinae subfamily of the ovenbird family Furnariidae. It is found in Argentina and Bolivia, and as a vagrant in Chile.

== Taxonomy and systematics ==
For a time the straight-billed earthcreeper was placed in genus Upucerthia but since the early 2000s has been in its present genus.

The straight-billed earthcreeper is monotypic.

== Description ==
The rock earthcreeper is 16 to 18 cm (6.3 to 7.1 in) long and weighs 28 to 34 g (0.99 to 1.2 oz). It is a medium-sized earthcreeper whose bill is long and slightly decurved. The sexes are alike. Adults have a buff supercilium, a dark brownish stripe behind the eye, and buff cheeks. Their crown, back, and rump are rich brown and their uppertail coverts dark rufous-brown. Their tail is dark rufous and their wings slightly more rufescent than their back. Their throat is buffy whitish, their breast and belly darker with a tawny tinge and darker streaks on their sides and flanks, and their undertail coverts tawny. Their iris is brown, their bill blackish with a pale gray base to the mandible, and their legs and feet dark brown or gray-brown. Juveniles have pale feather edges on their back and a scaly pattern on their underparts.

== Distribution and habitat ==
The rock earthcreeper is found in the eastern foothills of the Andes Mountains, from La Paz Department in western Bolivia south into northern Argentina as far as Catamarca Province, and extreme eastern Antofagasta Region of Chile. (The South American Classification Committee of the American Ornithological Society lists it as a vagrant in Chile.)

The rock earthcreeper inhabits arid scrublands and puna grasslands with bunchgrass and scattered bushes. It favors rocky hillsides, rocky outcrops, and ravines. In elevation it mostly ranges between 2,600 and 4,200 m (8,500 and 13,800 ft) and occurs locally as high as 4,500 m (14,800 ft).

== Behavior ==
=== Movement ===
The rock earthcreeper is a year-round resident throughout its range, except perhaps in Chile.

=== Feeding ===
The rock earthcreeper forages on the ground for its arthropod diet, usually singly but also in pairs. It gleans and extracts its prey while hopping among the rocks, bunchgrass, and bushes of its habitat. It is often wary and difficult to approach, flying off for considerable distances when disturbed.

=== Breeding ===
The rock earthcreeper is thought to be monomgamous. It apparently breeds in the austral summer. It excavates a tunnel in an earthen bank or occupies a rock crevice, and lines the nest chamber with soft material such as grass, hair, and feathers. The clutch size is two eggs. The incubation period, time to fledging, and details of parental care are not known.

=== Vocalization ===
The rock earthcreeper sings from a perch on a bush or boulder, a series of loud, shrill notes "vee-vee-vee-vee-vi-veet", sometimes ending with a splutter. It makes an alarm call, "a high-pitched, rodent-like, squeaky, whistled 'zuwééét' ".

== Status ==
The IUCN has assessed the straight-billed earthcreeper as being of Least Concern. It has a somewhat limited range and its population size is not known and is believed to be decreasing. No immediate threats have been identified. It is considered uncommon to fairly common, and is thought "reasonably secure, with overgrazing the only human disturbance".
