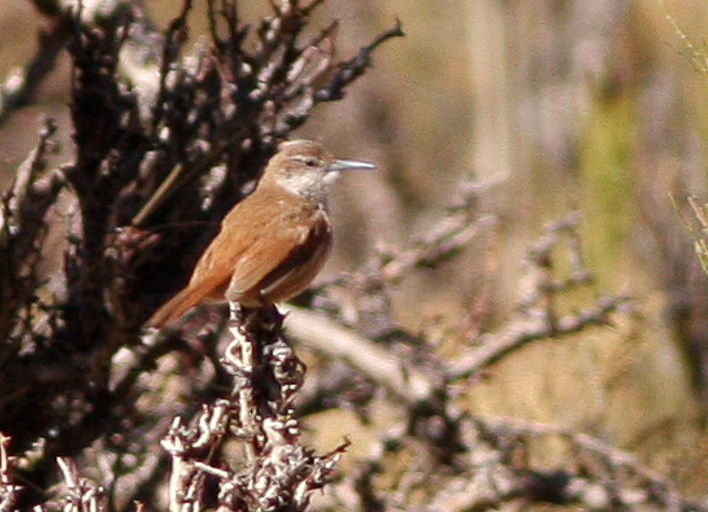

Conservation status
- Least Concern (IUCN 3.1)

Scientific classification
- Kingdom: Animalia
- Phylum: Chordata
- Class: Aves
- Order: Passeriformes
- Family: Furnariidae
- Genus: Ochetorhynchus
- Species: O. ruficaudus

Binomial name
- Ochetorhynchus ruficaudus Meyen, 1834

Synonyms
- Upucerthia ruficaudus (Meyen, 1834)

= Straight-billed earthcreeper =

Species of bird

The straight-billed earthcreeper (Ochetorhynchus ruficaudus) is a species of bird in the Furnariinae subfamily of the ovenbird family Furnariidae. It is found in Argentina, Bolivia, Chile, and Peru.

== Taxonomy and systematics ==
The straight-billed earthcreeper has these three subspecies:

- O. r. montanus (d'Orbigny & Lafresnaye, 1838)
- O. r. famatinae (Nores, 1986)
- O. r. ruficaudus Meyen, 1834

For a time the straight-billed earthcreeper was placed in genus Upucerthia but since the early 2000s has been in its present genus.

== Description ==
The straight-billed earthcreeper 16 to 19 cm (6.3 to 7.5 in) long and weighs 28 to 41 g (0.99 to 1.4 oz). It is a medium-sized earthcreeper whose bill is long and only very slightly decurved. The sexes are alike. Adults of the nominate subspecies O. r. ruficaudus have a dull brownish face with some paler inclusions, a narrow whitish supercilium, a black stripe through the eye, and whitish cheeks. In the north of their range their crown is brown with slight darker mottling, their back and rump rufescent brown, and their uppertail coverts dark rufescent. In the south their upperparts are darker and less reddish. Their tail's central pair of feathers have a rufous base that blends to blackish tips and the outermost pair are mostly rufous. The feathers between them have mostly blackish-brown inner webs and dark rufous outer webs. Their throat is whitish, their breast whitish with faint dull brownish streaks, their flanks and belly pale rufescent browish with some whitish streaks on the upper belly, and their undertail coverts tawny. Their iris is brown, their bill black or blackish brown with a whitish horn base to the mandible, and their legs and feet black or blackish brown. Juveniles have an overall rufous tinge and pale edges on their crown and back feathers.

Subspecies O. r. montanus has a whiter throat and breast than the nominate with more conspicuous streaks on the sides and flanks. O. r. famatinae has a slightly darker back than the nominate, a whiter breast, and darker flanks and undertail coverts.

== Distribution and habitat ==
The straight-billed earthcreeper is a bird of the southern Andes. Subspecies O. r. montanus is the most northerly. It is found from the Department of Arequipa in southern Peru into northern Chile to the Tarapacá Region, and east and south through Bolivia from La Paz Department into northern Argentina as far as Catamarca Province. The nominate O. r. ruficaudus is found in western Argentina between San Juan and extreme northern Santa Cruz provinces and in adjoining Chile as far south as the Santiago Metropolitan Region. O. r. famatinae is restricted to the Sierra de Famatina in northwestern Argentina's La Rioja Province.

The straight-billed earthcreeper inhabits arid scrublands with bunchgrass and scattered bushes. It favors rocky hillsides, rocky outcrops, and ravines. In elevation it mostly ranges between 2,300 and 4,300 m (7,500 and 14,100 ft) though it is common down to 1,800 m (5,900 ft) and occurs locally as low as 1,300 m (4,300 ft).

== Behavior ==
=== Movement ===
The straight-billed earthcreeper is a year-round resident throughout its range.

=== Feeding ===
The straight-billed earthcreeper forages on the ground for its arthropod diet, usually singly but also in pairs. It gleans and extracts its prey while hopping among the rocks, bunchgrass, and bushes of its habitat.

=== Breeding ===
The straight-billed earthcreeper is thought to be monomgamous. It breeds in the austral summer, mostly between November and February. It excavates a tunnel in an earthen bank or occupies a rock crevice, and lines the nest chamber with soft material such as grass, hair, and feathers. The clutch size is two eggs. The incubation period, time to fledging, and details of parental care are not known.

=== Vocalization ===
The straight-billed earthcreeper's song is a loud series of notes that first rises in pitch and then slowly descends and fades away. Its call is "a sharp 'kweep' or 'wheet' ".

== Status ==
The IUCN has assessed the straight-billed earthcreeper as being of Least Concern. It has a fairly large range but its population size is not known and is believed to be decreasing. No immediate threats have been identified. It is considered fairly common throughout its range and is "reasonably safe from anthropogenic disturbances, except overgrazing".
