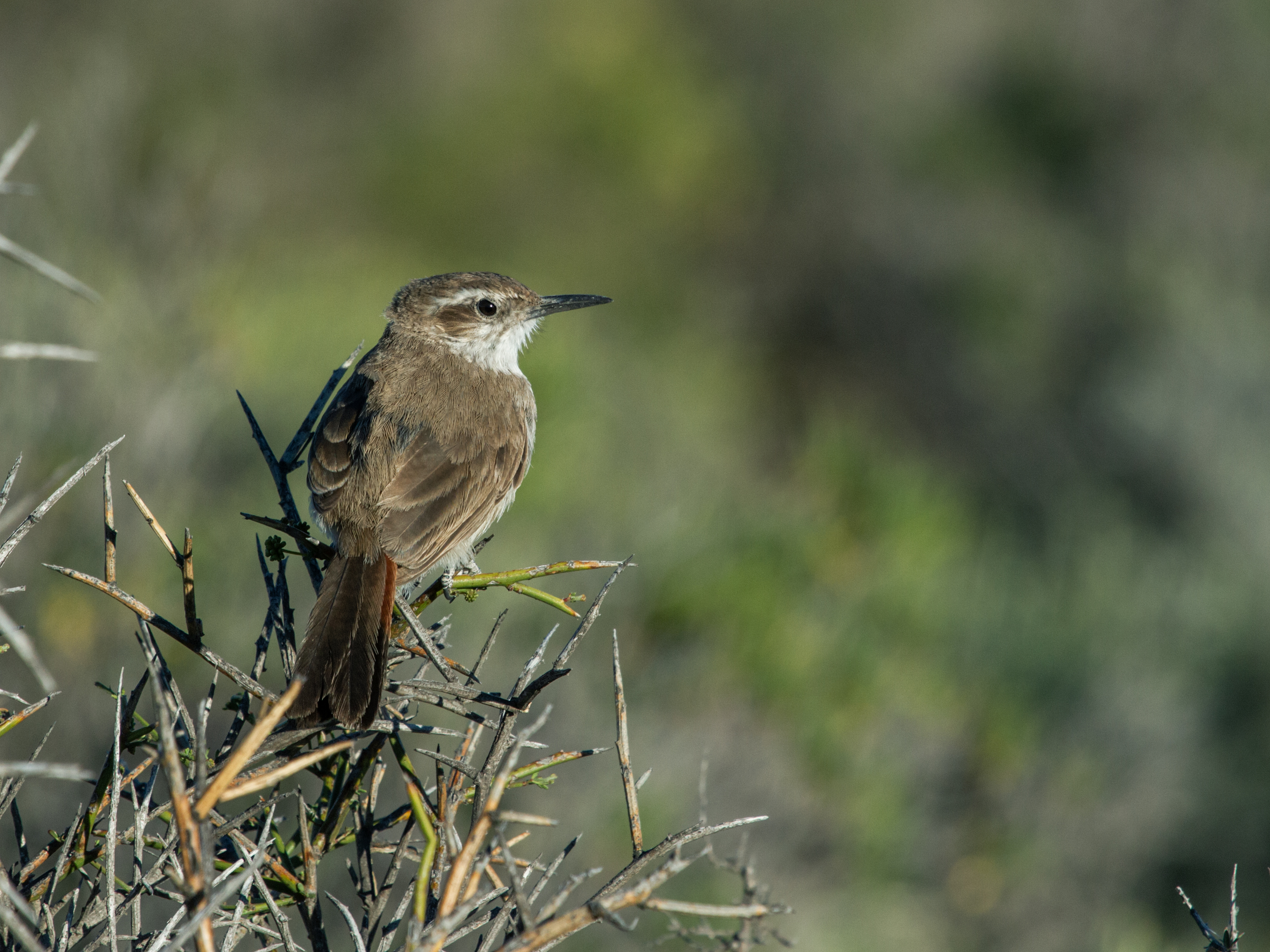

Conservation status
- Least Concern (IUCN 3.1)

Scientific classification
- Kingdom: Animalia
- Phylum: Chordata
- Class: Aves
- Order: Passeriformes
- Family: Furnariidae
- Genus: Ochetorhynchus
- Species: O. phoenicurus

Binomial name
- Ochetorhynchus phoenicurus (Gould, 1839)

Synonyms
- Eremobius phoenicurus (Gould, 1839)

= Band-tailed earthcreeper =

Species of bird

The band-tailed earthcreeper (Ochetorhynchus phoenicurus) is a species of bird in the Furnariinae subfamily of the ovenbird family Furnariidae. It is found in Argentina and Chile.

== Taxonomy and systematics ==
The band-tailed earthcreeper was originally described as Eremobius phoenicurus. In the early 1900s at least one publication put it in genus Enicornis. Since the early 2000s has been in its present genus.

The band-tailed earthcreeper is monotypic.

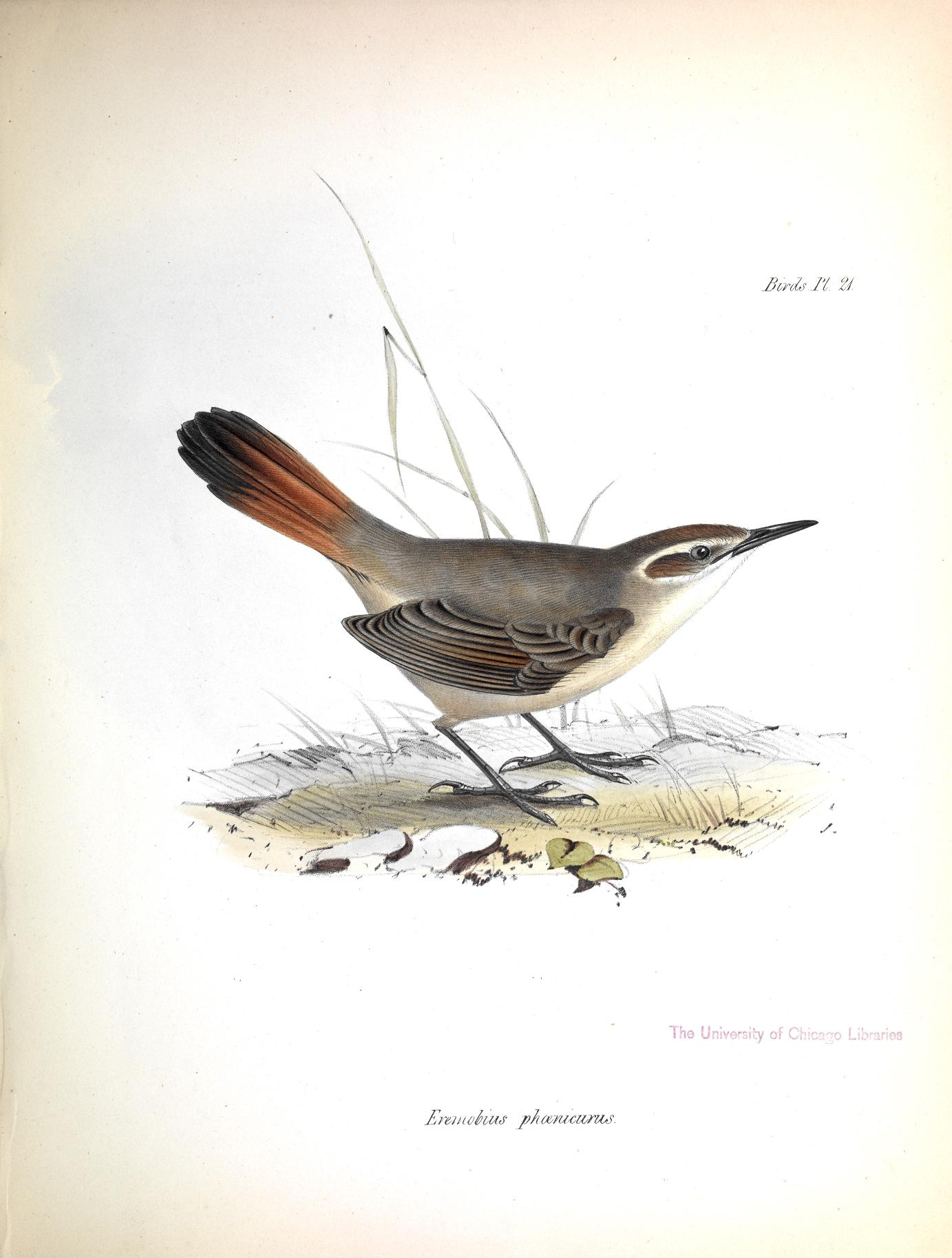

== Description ==
The band-tailed earthcreeper is 16 to 17 cm (6.3 to 6.7 in) long and weighs 28 to 34 g (0.99 to 1.2 oz). It is a smallish earthcreeper whose medium-length bill is thin and straight. The sexes are alike. Adults have a white supercilium, a dark stripe behind the eye, and rufescent cheeks. Their crown and upperparts are plain dull gray-brown. Their tail's central pair of feathers are fuscous blackish with dull gray-brown bases and the rest have a sharp line between dark rufous bases and black ends. Their wings are dull gray-brown. Their throat is whitish with grayer edges, their breast and belly pale dull gray-brown with paler streaks on the breast and flanks, and their undertail coverts whitish. Their iris is dark brown, their bill black or blackish brown with a pale gray or horn base to the mandible, and their legs and feet blackish brown or blackish. Juveniles have pale feather edges on their forehead and much fainter streaking on their underparts than adults.

== Distribution and habitat ==
The band-tailed earthcreeper is found in southwestern Argentina between Neuquén and Santa Cruz provinces and in the northeastern part of far southern Chile's Magallanes Region. It inhabits arid scrublands and temperate grasslands. It favors thinly vegetated plains, plateaus, and slopes. In elevation it ranges from near sea level to 1,200 m (3,900 ft).

== Behavior ==
=== Movement ===
The band-tailed earthcreeper is a year-round resident throughout its range.

=== Feeding ===
The band-tailed earthcreeper forages on the ground for its arthropod diet, usually singly. It probes and gleans on bare ground, in rock crevices, and in grass clumps and cushion plants.

=== Breeding ===
The band-tailed earthcreeper is thought to be monomgamous. It breeds in the austral summer, at least between September and January. It constructs a ball nest of thorny twigs with a side entrance to a tunnel leading to the nest chamber, typically placed about 1 to 2 m (3 to 7 ft) above the ground in a low bush or cactus. It lines the floor of the chamber with soft material such as hair, flowers, and feathers. The clutch size is two to four eggs. The incubation period, time to fledging, and details of parental care are not known.

=== Vocalization ===
The band-tailed earthcreeper's song is "a fast dry trill that sometimes ends with separate sharp 'ti' notes". Its alarm call is "a repeated, husky 'suwee' or 'wheet' ".

== Status ==
The IUCN has assessed the band-tailed earthcreeper as being of Least Concern. It has a somewhat limited range and its population size is not known and is believed to be decreasing. No immediate threats have been identified. It is considered to be uncommon to fairly common, and its habitat "appears to be reasonably secure, with overgrazing probably the only form of anthropogenic disturbance".
