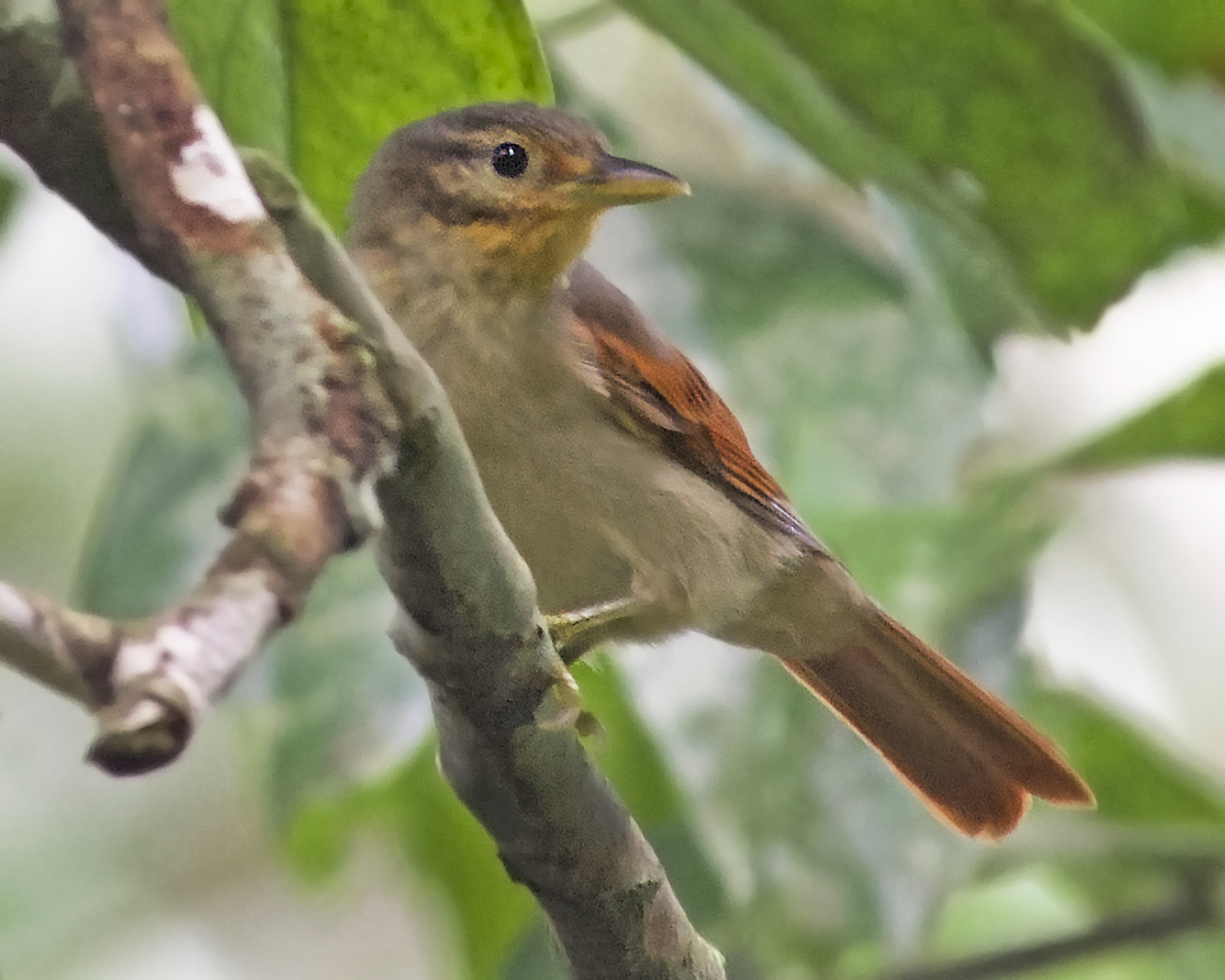

Conservation status
- Least Concern (IUCN 3.1)

Scientific classification
- Kingdom: Animalia
- Phylum: Chordata
- Class: Aves
- Order: Passeriformes
- Family: Furnariidae
- Genus: Dendroma
- Species: D. erythroptera

Binomial name
- Dendroma erythroptera (Sclater, PL, 1856)

Synonyms
- Philydor erythropterus

= Chestnut-winged foliage-gleaner =

Species of bird

The chestnut-winged foliage-gleaner (Dendroma erythroptera) is a species of bird in the Furnariinae subfamily of the ovenbird family Furnariidae. It is found in Bolivia, Brazil, Colombia, Ecuador, Peru, and Venezuela.

== Taxonomy and systematics ==
The chestnut-winged foliage-gleaner's taxonomy is unsettled. The International Ornithological Committee (IOC) and the Clements taxonomy follow the conclusions of a 2011 publication that moved the species from genus Philydor to Dendroma. BirdLife International's Handbook of the Birds of the World (HBW) retains it in Philydor.

According to the IOC and Clements, the chestnut-winged foliage-gleaner shares genus Dendroma with the buff-fronted foliage-gleaner (D. rufa), and they and the chestnut-winged hookbill (Ancistrops strigilatus) are sister species. HBW retains the buff-fronted foliage-gleaner in genus Philydor with the chestnut-winged and several other foliage-gleaner species, and does not agree with the above sister species treatment.

The three taxonomic systems agree with assigning two subspecies to the buff-fronted foliage-gleaner, here listed using genus Dendroma. (HBW retains the neuter spellings of the specific epithets instead of the feminine ones required by Dendroma.) They are the nominate subspecies D. e. erythroptera (Sclater, PL, 1856) and D. e. diluvialis (Griscom & Greenway Jr., 1937).

== Description ==
The chestnut-winged foliage-gleaner is 17 to 19 cm (6.7 to 7.5 in) long and weighs 28 to 36 g (0.99 to 1.3 oz). It is a largish furnariid. The sexes have the same plumage. Adults of the nominate subspecies have a wide tawny eyering, an indistinct tawny supercilium that narrows past the eye, a dark gray area behind the eye, brownish lores, dull brownish ear coverts, and ochraceous yellow malars. Their crown is dull brownish gray with buff streaks. Their back and rump are dull grayish brown and their uppertail coverts are slightly paler. Their wing coverts are rufous with black streaks, their primary coverts dark chestnut, and their flight feathers darkish rufous with dark fuscous tips. Their tail is dark rufous. Their throat is ochraceous yellow and their breast light brownish with indistinct ochraceous tawny streaks that fade to their slightly paler belly. Their flanks and undertail coverts are light grayish brown. Their iris is brown to dark brown, their maxilla dark brown to brownish, their mandible greenish horn to yellowish green, and their legs and feet yellowish green to light greenish olive. Juveniles are slightly paler and duller overall than adults, with a darker throat and few or no streaks on their underparts. Subspecies D. e. diluvialis has browner (less grayish) upperparts than the nominate, a much more buffy breast, and browner flanks and undertail coverts.

== Distribution and habitat ==
The nominate subspecies of the chestnut-winged foliage-gleaner is found from southeastern Colombia south through eastern Ecuador and eastern Peru into northeastern Bolivia and east in Brazil south of the Amazon to the Rio Madeira. It also has a separate smaller range in southern Venezuela's Amazonas and Bolívar states. D. e. diluvialis is found further east, in the Brazilian states of Pará and Maranhão. The species inhabits tropical lowland evergreen forest and flooded forest. It favors terra firme forest but also occurs more locally in várzea forest. In elevation it mostly ranges only to 500 m (1,600 ft) but locally is found as high as 1,200 m (3,900 ft).

== Behavior ==
=== Movement ===
The chestnut-winged foliage-gleaner is a year-round resident throughout its range.

=== Feeding ===
The chestnut-winged foliage-gleaner feeds on arthropods. It typically forages in pairs, and usually in mixed-species feeding flocks. It mostly forages from the forest's mid-storey to its canopy though it will do so lower. It typically forages near the ends of branches, acrobatically gleaning prey from live and dead leaves and sometimes twigs.

=== Breeding ===
Nothing is known about the chestnut-winged foliage-gleaner's breeding biology.

=== Vocalization ===
The chestnut-winged foliage-gleaner's song is a two- or three-second "fast, buzzy, slightly accelerating, quavering or slightly descending trill".

== Status ==
The IUCN has assessed the chestnut-winged foliage-gleaner as being of Least Concern. It has a very large range but its population size is not known and is believed to be decreasing. No immediate threats have been identified. It is considered uncommon to fairly common and occurs in several protected areas.
