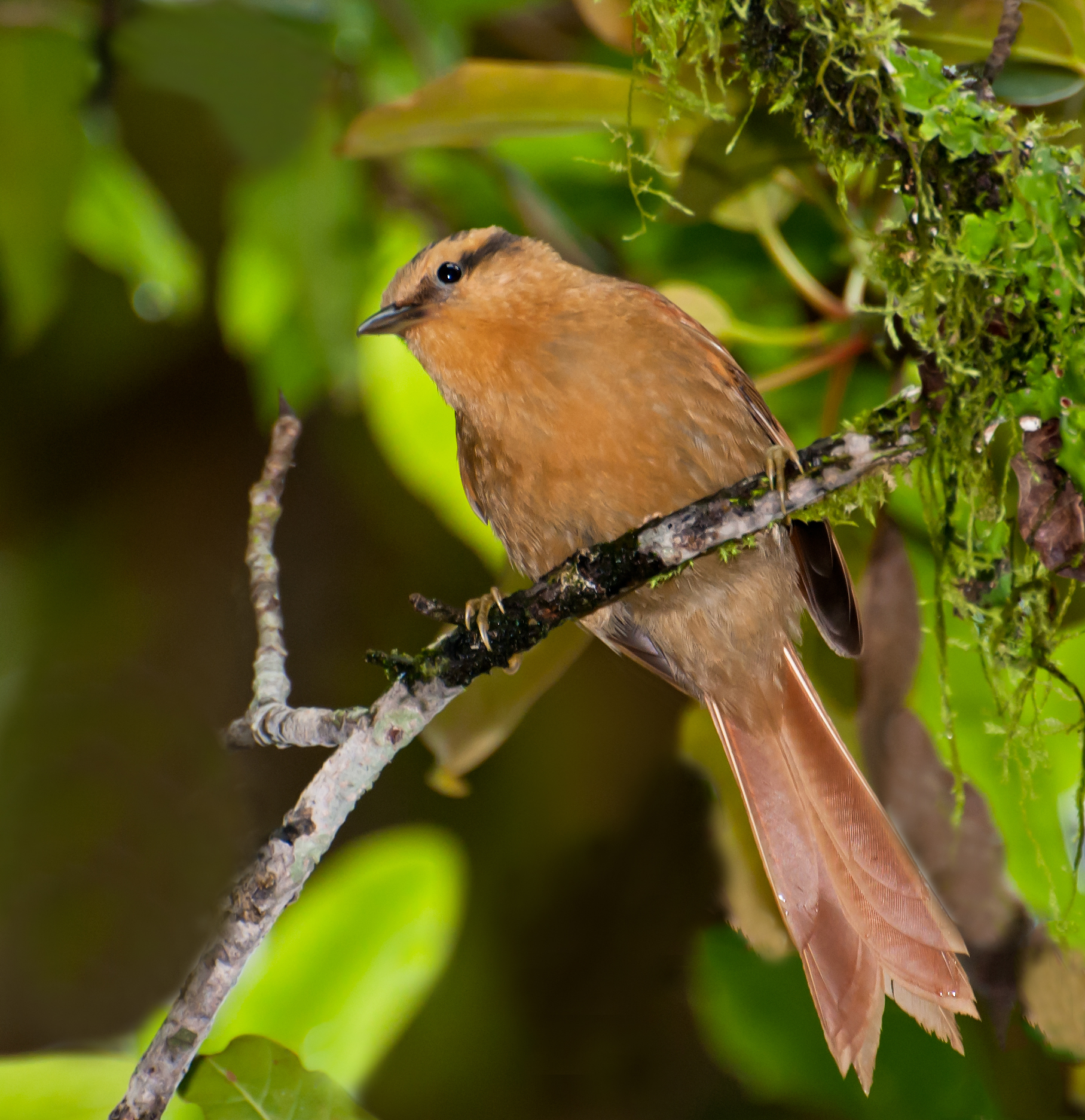
- at Reserva Guainumbi, São Luis do Paraitinga, São Paulo State, Brazil

Conservation status
- Least Concern (IUCN 3.1)

Scientific classification
- Kingdom: Animalia
- Phylum: Chordata
- Class: Aves
- Order: Passeriformes
- Family: Furnariidae
- Genus: Dendroma
- Species: D. rufa

Binomial name
- Dendroma rufa (Vieillot, 1818)

Synonyms
- Philydor rufus (Vieillot, 1818) (lapsus)

= Buff-fronted foliage-gleaner =

Species of bird

The buff-fronted foliage-gleaner (Dendroma rufa) is a species of bird in the Furnariinae subfamily of the ovenbird family Furnariidae. It is native to the Neotropical realm.

== Taxonomy and systematics ==
The buff-fronted foliage-gleaner's taxonomy is unsettled. The International Ornithological Committee (IOC) and the Clements taxonomy follow the conclusions of a 2011 publication that moved the species from genus Philydor to Dendroma. BirdLife International's Handbook of the Birds of the World (HBW) retains it in Philydor.

According to the IOC and Clements, the buff-fronted foliage-gleaner shares genus Dendroma with the chestnut-winged foliage-gleaner (D. erythroptera), and they and the chestnut-winged hookbill (Ancistrops strigilatus) are sister species. HBW retains the chestnut-winged foliage-gleaner in genus Philydor with the buff-fronted and several other foliage-gleaner species, and does not agree with the above sister species treatment.

The three taxonomic systems agree with assigning these seven subspecies to the buff-fronted foliage-gleaner, here listed using genus Dendroma. (HBW retains the neuter spellings of the specific epithets instead of the feminine ones required by Dendroma.)

- D. r. panerythra (Sclater, PL, 1862)
- D. r. riveti (Ménégaux & Hellmayr, 1906)
- D. r. columbiana (Cabanis & Heine, 1860)
- D. r. cuchiverus (Phelps, WH & Phelps, WH Jr, 1949)
- D. r. boliviana (Berlepsch, 1907)
- D. r. chapadensis (Zimmer, JT, 1935)
- D. r. rufa (Vieillot, 1818)

== Description ==
The buff-fronted foliage-gleaner is 18 to 19 cm (7.1 to 7.5 in) long and weighs 25 to 36 g (0.88 to 1.3 oz). It is a largish furnariid. The sexes have the same plumage. Adults of the nominate subspecies D. r. rufa have an ochraceous forehead ("front") that continues into a wide supercilium, a dark brownish gray line behind the eye, dark brownish gray lores, and ochraceous ear coverts and malars. Their crown behind the forehead is dull brownish gray with almost invisible paler streaks. Their upper back is dull brownish gray becoming ochraceous brown on the lower back. Their rump and uppertail coverts are a slightly paler ochraceous brown. Their wings are mostly bright rufous with darker primary coverts. Their dull rufous-brown tail has pointed feather tips. Their throat and breast are glowing ochraceous that fades to the duller ochraceous of their belly, flanks, and undertail coverts. Their iris is grayish brown to dark brown to chestnut, their maxilla blackish to dark grayish, their mandible silvery gray to olive, and their legs and feet olive to grayish green. Juveniles have a narrower forehead band than adults, with a paler crown and darker and more rufescent underparts.

Subspecies D. r. chapadensis has a deeper ochraceous forehead than the nominate, and a paler gray crown with a few ochraceous spots and richer colors on the back. D. r. boliviana has a paler and more olivaceous (not gray) crown than the nominate. D. r. riveti is smaller than the nominate, with a darker crown and back, a more rufous tail, and a brownish wash on the breast and belly. D. r. columbiana has a buff forehead band that is narrower and duller than the nominate's, with an olivaceous crown, a darker back, and a much paler belly. D. r. cuchiverus is similar to columbiana but with an ochraceous forehead like the nominate's. D. r. panerythra has a paler, more grayish crown and back than cuchiverus, with deeper and more uniform ochraceous underparts.

== Distribution and habitat ==
The buff-fronted foliage-gleaner has a highly disjunct distribution, with at least seven general areas represented and smaller areas within some of them. The subspecies are found thus:

- D. r. panerythra: spottily in the highlands of Costa Rica and Panama and also in the Central and Eastern Andes and separate Serranía de San Lucas of Colombia
- D. r. riveti: Colombia's Western Andes and south through most of western Ecuador
- D. r. columbiana: northern Venezuela's Sierra de San Luis and Coastal Range
- D. r. cuchiverus: southern Venezuela's Cerro Calentura and Cerro El Negro
- D. r. boliviana: east slope of the Andes from Napo Province in Ecuador south through eastern Peru into central Bolivia
- D. r. chapadensis: mostly in Brazil's Mato Grosso and Goiás states, and recorded in Tocantins
- D. r. rufa: eastern and southeastern Brazil from Bahia south to Rio Grande do Sul and west and south through Mato Grosso do Sul and eastern Paraguay into northeastern Argentina

The buff-fronted foliage-gleaner populations in Central America, northern South America, and the Andes inhabit humid foothill and montane forest. In Central America the species occurs at elevations between 800 and 2,500 m (2,600 and 8,200 ft) and in northern and western South America between 600 and 2,000 m (2,000 and 6,600 ft). In the southeast, the species inhabits tropical lowland evergreen forest and gallery forest from near sea level mostly to 1,000 m (3,300 ft) and locally to 1,200 m (3,900 ft).

== Behavior ==
=== Movement ===
The buff-fronted foliage-gleaner is a year-round resident throughout its range.

=== Feeding ===
The buff-fronted foliage-gleaner feeds on a wide variety of adult and larval arthropods. It typically forages singly or in pairs, and usually in mixed-species feeding flocks. It mostly forages in the forest's subcanopy and canopy though it will do so lower. It works along horizontal branches and acrobatically gleans its prey, primarily from live leaves and also dead leaves, bark, moss, and debris, sometimes hanging nearly upside down to reach their undersides.

=== Breeding ===
The buff-fronted foliage-gleaner's breeding season or seasons have not been fully defined. In Colombia the season includes June and in Argentina it includes January. The species is assumed to be monogamous. It nests in a hole in an earthen bank, a tree, and sometimes in a wall, in all cases probably an existing hole rather than one it excavates. It lines the nest chamber with fine grass. The clutch size is two or three eggs; the incubation period, time to fledging, and details of parental care are not known.

=== Vocalization ===
The buff-fronted foliage gleaner's song appears to be similar in most areas of South America. There it is described as "a fast, accelerating series of staccato, metallic notes, 'whi-ki-ki-ki-ke-ke-ke-kuh-kuh', sometimes descending slightly at end". In Costa Rica it is described as a "squeaky 'woika-woika-woika...' ". Its calls are " a peculiar, squeaky but harsh 'shirrr' or 'chur', almost frog-like, and sharp, metallic 'skik' or 'chik' ".

== Status ==
The IUCN has assessed the buff-fronted foliage-gleaner as being of Least Concern. It has an extremely large range and an estimated population of at least 500,000 mature individuals, though the latter is believed to be decreasing. No immediate threats have been identified. It is considered uncommon to rare in most of its range and fairly common in the southeast. (The apparent scarcity might be due to the difficulty of observing this tree-top species.) It occurs in many protected areas.
