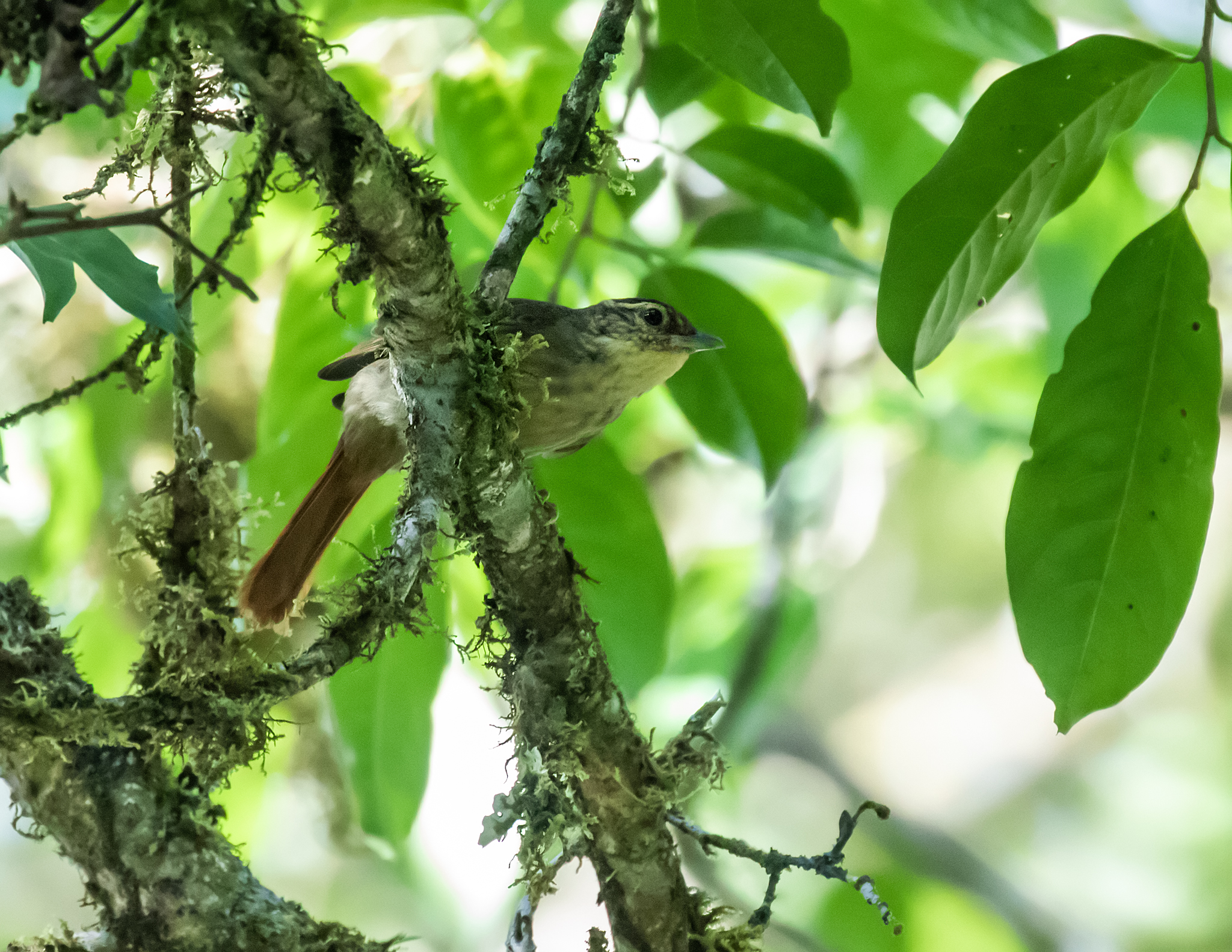

Conservation status
- Least Concern (IUCN 3.1)

Scientific classification
- Kingdom: Animalia
- Phylum: Chordata
- Class: Aves
- Order: Passeriformes
- Family: Furnariidae
- Genus: Anabacerthia
- Species: A. ruficaudata

Binomial name
- Anabacerthia ruficaudata (d'Orbigny & Lafresnaye, 1838)

Synonyms
- Philydor ruficaudatus Philydor ruficaudatum

= Rufous-tailed foliage-gleaner =

Species of bird

The rufous-tailed foliage-gleaner (Anabacerthia ruficaudata) is a species of bird in the Furnariinae subfamily of the ovenbird family Furnariidae. It is found in Bolivia, Brazil, Colombia, Ecuador, Guyana, Peru, Suriname, Venezuela, and possibly French Guiana.

== Taxonomy and systematics ==
The rufous-tailed foliage-gleaner's taxonomy is unsettled. The International Ornithological Committee and BirdLife International's Handbook of the Birds of the World recognize three subspecies, the nominate A. r. ruficaudata (d'Orbigny & Lafresnaye, 1838), A. r. subflavescens (Cabanis, 1873), and A. r. flavipectus (Phelps, WH & Gilliard, 1941). The Clements taxonomy does not recognize A. r. subflavescens but includes it in the nominate.

The rufous-tailed foliage-gleaner was previously included in genus Philydor but a 2011 paper made it plain that it did not belong there.

This article follows the three-subspecies model.

== Description ==
The rufous-tailed foliage-gleaner is 16 to 17 cm (6.3 to 6.7 in) long and weighs 21 to 32 g (0.74 to 1.1 oz). It is a medium-sized furnariid with a wedge-shaped bill. The sexes have the same plumage. Adults of the nominate subspecies have a wide ochraceous buff eyering, a narrow buff-yellow supercilium, a dark olive line behind the eye, olive-brownish lores and ear coverts with yellowish buff flecks and streaks, and a buff-yellow malar area. Their crown is dark olive with faint paler spots and streaks toward the rear, their back and rump are dark olive with pale streaks on the upper back, and their uppertail coverts are dark olive with rufous tips. Their tail is rufous. Their wings are mostly dark olive-brown, with darker brown primary coverts. Their throat is buff-yellow with some irregular darker inclusions, their breast dull buff yellow with indistinct olivaceous streaks, their belly dull buff yellow with very faint streaks, and their flanks and undertail coverts slightly darker and more olivaceous. Their iris is brown, their maxilla blackish to grayish horn, their mandible paler greenish gray to olive-green, and their legs and feet yellowish brown to olive-green. Juveniles have a more apparent and ochraceous supercilium, browner (less olive) upperparts, and darker less yellowish underparts than adults. Subspecies A. r. subflavescens is very similar to the nominate but with a clearer yellow throat and less noticeable streaks on its underparts. Subspecies A. r. flavipectus has a more ochraceous supercilum and ear coverts, a darker yellowish throat, and more yellowish underparts than the nominate. There is much intergrading between the subspecies.

== Distribution and habitat ==
The nominate subspecies of the rufous-tailed foliage-gleaner is found in southeastern Amazonian Brazil, southeastern Peru, and northern Bolivia. A. r. subflavescens is found in northeastern Ecuador and eastern Peru. A. r. flavipectus is found in southeastern Colombia, southern Venezuela, Guyana, Suriname, and northeastern Brazil. A. r. flavipectus might also occur in French Guiana, but the South American Classification Committee of the American Ornithological Society terms it hypothetical there because the records are not documented.

The rufous-tailed foliage-gleaner inhabits tropical lowland evergreen and seasonally flooded forest. It primarily occurs in terra firme forest but also locally in tall várzea forest. In elevation it mostly occurs below 850 m (2,800 ft) but reaches 900 m (3,000 ft) in Brazil and 1,300 m (4,300 ft) in Venezuela.

== Behavior ==
=== Movement ===
The rufous-tailed foliage-gleaner is a year-round resident throughout its range.

=== Feeding ===
The rufous-tailed foliage-gleaner feeds on a variety of arthropods including Orthoptera, Coleoptera, Heteroptera and spiders. It forages singly and in pairs, almost always as part of mixed-species feeding flocks. It forages from the forest's mid-storey to its canopy. It gleans its prey, especially from dead leaves but also from live foliage, epiphytes, vines, and moss.

=== Breeding ===
Nothing is known about the rufous-tailed foliage-gleaner's breeding biology.

=== Vocalization ===
One description of the rufous-tailed foliage-gleaner's song is "a loud, staccato series of up to 25 'te' or 'ke' notes, descends and accelerates at end, or on same pitch, accelerating, then decelerating slightly at end". It also sings a "more variable 'wt-pt-pt, wit-wit-wit, d-d-d-d-d-d-d-d-d' ". Its call, at least in Brazil, is a "dry very short rattle, like 'krrreh' "; it has apparently not been described elsewhere.

== Status ==
The IUCN has assessed the rufous-tailed foliage-gleaner as being of Least Concern. It has a very large range, but its population size is not known and is believed to be decreasing. No immediate threats have been identified. It is considered rare to locally common and occurs in several protected areas.
