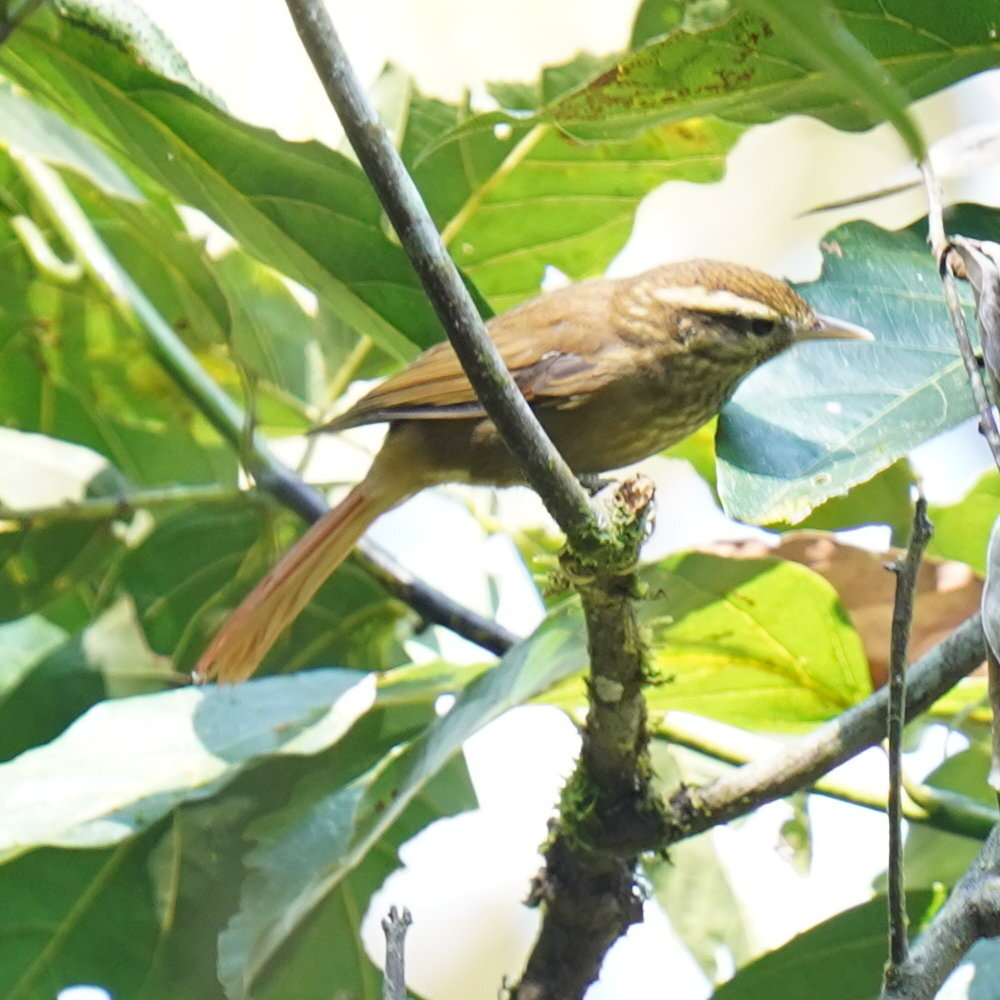

Conservation status
- Least Concern (IUCN 3.1)

Scientific classification
- Kingdom: Animalia
- Phylum: Chordata
- Class: Aves
- Order: Passeriformes
- Family: Furnariidae
- Genus: Anabacerthia
- Species: A. amaurotis

Binomial name
- Anabacerthia amaurotis (Temminck, 1823)

Synonyms
- Philydor amaurotis (Temminck, 1823)

= White-browed foliage-gleaner =

Species of bird

The white-browed foliage-gleaner (Anabacerthia amaurotis) is a species of bird in the Furnariinae subfamily of the ovenbird family Furnariidae. It is native to the Atlantic Forest.

== Taxonomy and systematics ==
The white-browed foliage-gleaner was previously included in genus Philydor but a 2011 paper made it plain that it did not belong there. The same paper found the ochre-breasted foliage-gleaner (A. lichtensteini) and the white-browed to be sister species.

The white-browed foliage gleaner is monotypic.

== Description ==
The white-browed foliage-gleaner is 15 to 16 cm (5.9 to 6.3 in) long. It is a medium-sized furnariid with a wedge-shaped bill. The sexes have the same plumage. Adults have a wide buff-white supercilium, a dark brown band behind the eye, and an indistinct brown "moustache" on an otherwise lightly flecked and streaked, light buff, face. Their crown is brown with black-edged white feathers at the center of the back, and they have a narrow pale buff collar that extends onto the side of their neck. Their back is rich medium brown, their rump a slightly paler brown, and their uppertail coverts rufous. Their tail is rufous with bare shafts at the very end of the feathers. Their wings are rich medium brown with darker brown primary coverts. Their throat is creamy whitish, their breast light brown with wide but blurry pale buff streaks, their belly unstreaked light brown, and their flanks and undertail coverts slightly darker brown with a rufescent tinge. Their iris is dark brown, their bill pale horn with some pale gray, and their legs and feet brownish cream to cream-tinged olive.

== Distribution and habitat ==
The white-browed foliage-gleaner is found from Espírito Santo in southeastern Brazil south into Rio Grande do Sul and Argentina's Misiones Province. Though some taxonomic systems also include southeastern Paraguay in the species' range, the South American Classification Committee of the American Ornithological Society treats it as hypothetical in that country because the records are undocumented. In much of its Brazilian range the species inhabits montane evergreen forest and tall secondary forest. At the southern end of its range in Brazil, Argentina, and apparently Paraguay, it inhabits lowland and hilly forest. In elevation it ranges mostly from 600 to 1,500 m (2,000 to 4,900 ft) but locally is found down to sea level.

== Behavior ==
=== Movement ===
The white-browed foliage-gleaner is a year-round resident throughout its range.

=== Feeding ===
The white-browed foliage-gleaner feeds on adult and larval arthropods. It usually forages as part of mixed-species feeding flocks, and usually in the forest's understory though it will feed as high as the subcanopy. It acrobatically gleans, probes, and pecks for its prey in dead leaves, debris, and branches. It occasionally will sally a short distance from a perch to capture prey.

=== Breeding ===
Nothing is known about the white-browed foliage-gleaner's breeding biology.

=== Vocalization ===
The white-browed foliage-gleaner's song is "a short, accelerated, ascending and descending series of very/ext. high 'seep' notes". Its call is an "extr. high, thin 'steep tseep seepseep -' ".

== Status ==
The IUCN has assessed the white-browed foliage-gleaner as least concern. It has a limited range and an unknown population size that is believed to be decreasing. The main threat is the continuing clearing of the Atlantic Forest for agriculture, industrialization, and urban expansion. The species "is now largely confined to a number of protected areas". It is considered rare to fairly common in most areas but "definitely rare and local" in the lower elevation southern part of its range.
