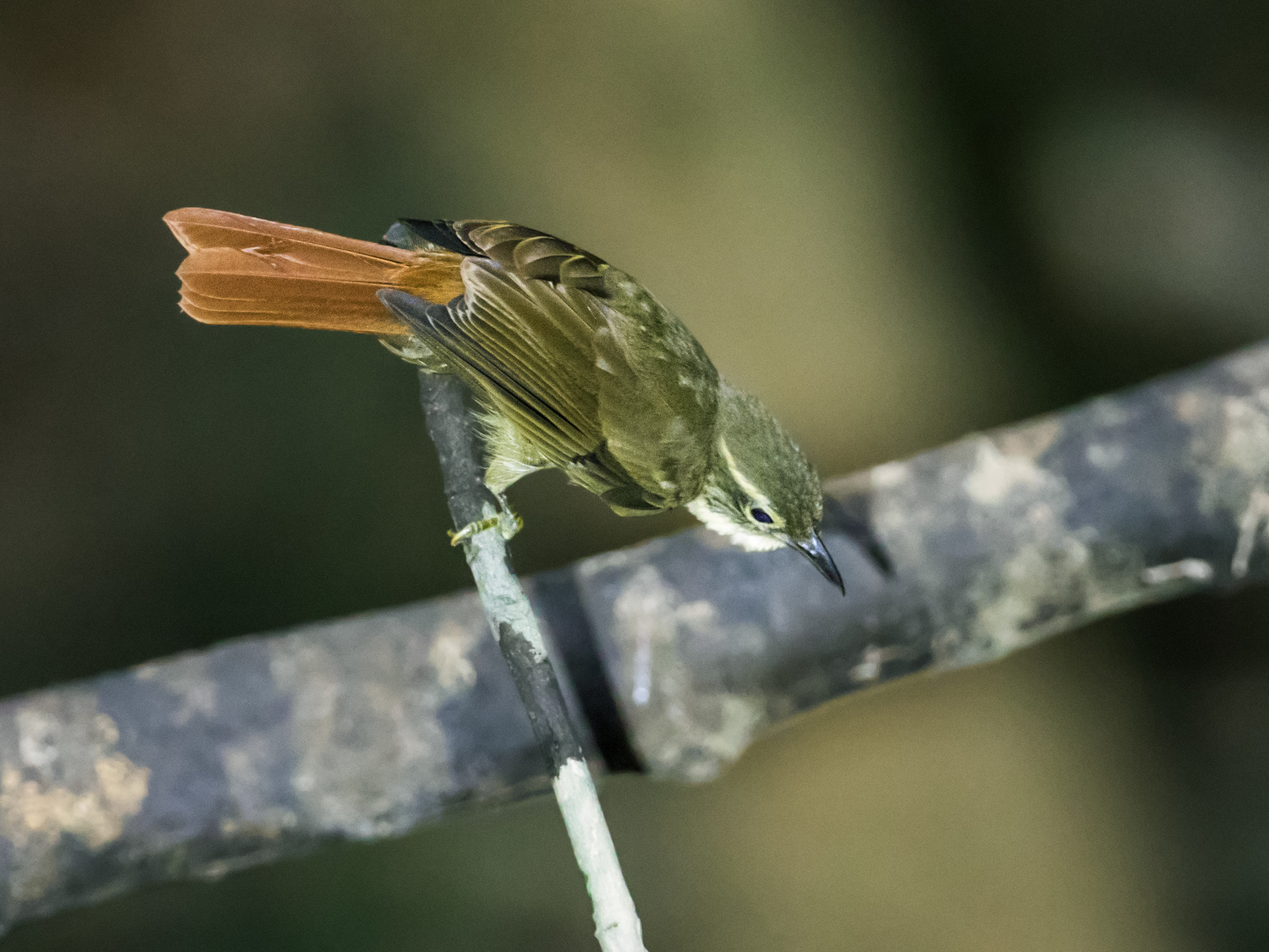
- Rufous-rumped foliage-gleaner (Neophilydor erythrocercum)

Scientific classification
- Kingdom: Animalia
- Phylum: Chordata
- Class: Aves
- Order: Passeriformes
- Family: Furnariidae
- Genus: Neophilydor; Sangster, Harvey, Gaudin & Claramunt, 2023

Type species
- Anabates erythrocercus Pelzeln, 1859

= Neophilydor =

Genus of birds

Neophilydor is a genus of foliage-gleaners, birds in the ovenbird family Furnariidae. The two species in the genus are found in parts of Middle and South America.

== Taxonomy ==
The two species now placed in this genus were formerly placed in the genus Philydor. Molecular phylogenetic studies published in 2011 and 2020 found that the genus Philydor was polyphyletic. As part of the reorganization to resolve the polyphyly, a new genus Neophilydor was introduced with Anabates erythrocercus Pelzeln, 1859, as the type species.

The genus contains the following two species:

- Rufous-rumped foliage-gleaner, Neophilydor erythrocercum
- Slaty-winged foliage-gleaner, Neophilydor fuscipenne
