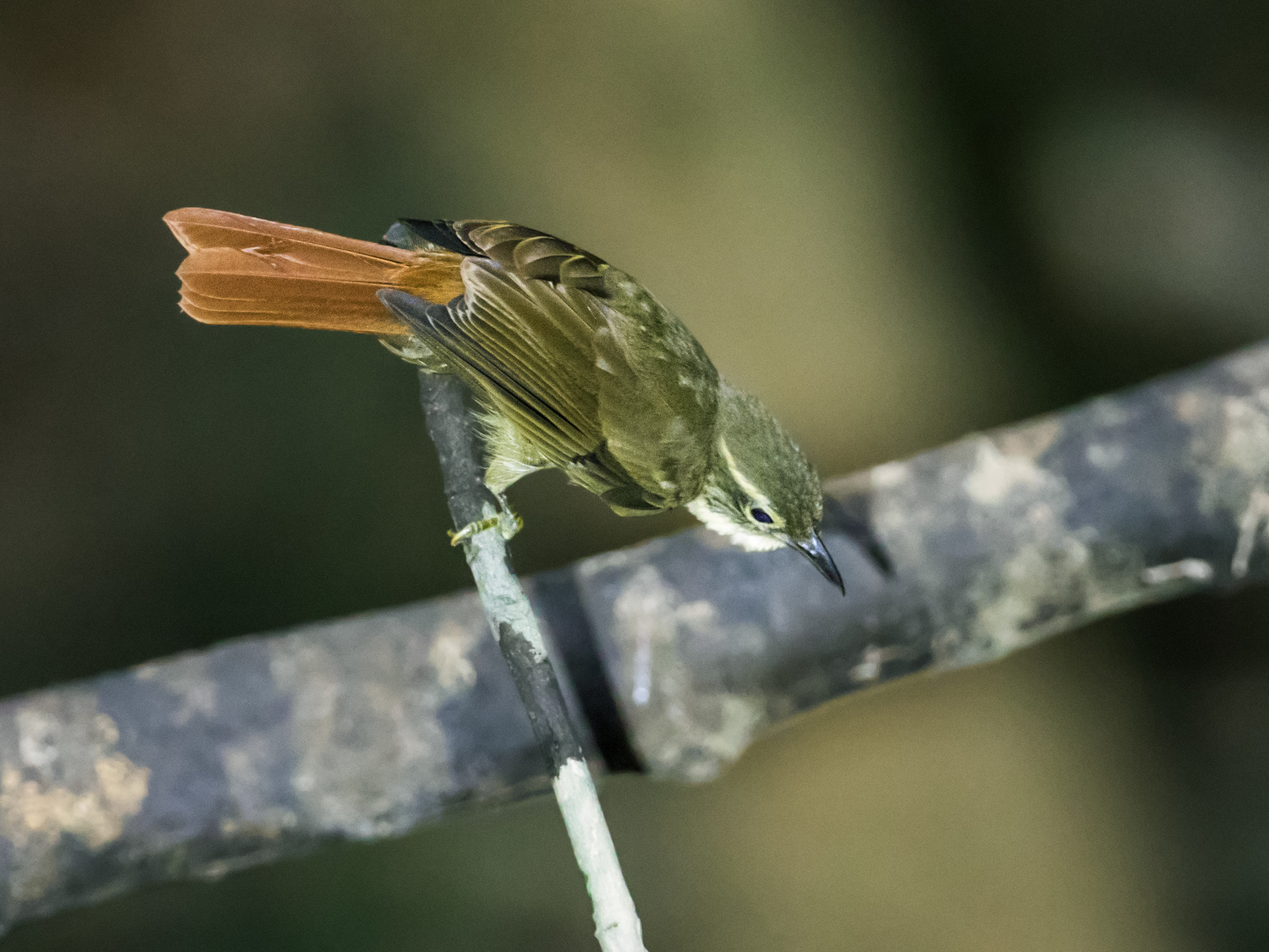

Conservation status
- Least Concern (IUCN 3.1)

Scientific classification
- Kingdom: Animalia
- Phylum: Chordata
- Class: Aves
- Order: Passeriformes
- Family: Furnariidae
- Genus: Neophilydor
- Species: N. erythrocercum

Binomial name
- Neophilydor erythrocercum (Pelzeln, 1859)

Synonyms
- Philydor erythrocercus (Pelzeln, 1859) [orthographic error] Philydor ochrogaster Hellmayr, 1917

= Rufous-rumped foliage-gleaner =

Species of bird

The rufous-rumped foliage-gleaner (Neophilydor erythrocercum) is a species of bird in the Furnariinae subfamily of the ovenbird family Furnariidae. It is found in Bolivia, Brazil, Colombia, Ecuador, French Guiana, Guyana, Peru, and Suriname.

== Taxonomy and systematics ==
The rufous-rumped foliage-gleaner was formally described in 1859 by the Austrian ornithologist August von Pelzeln based on a specimen collected at Barra do Rio Negro, now the city of Manaus in Brazil. He coined the binomial name Anabates erythrocercus. The specific epithet combines the Ancient Greek ερυθρος/eruthros meaning "red" with κερκος/kerkos meaning "tail".

The rufous-rumped foliage-gleaner was eventually moved to genus Philydor. Studies published in 2011 and 2023 defined and resolved the polyphyly of the genus Philydor and proposed a new genus Neophilydor for the rufous-rumped foliage-gleaner and slaty-winged foliage-gleaner (N. fuscipennis). In 2024 the South American Classification Committee of the American Ornithological Society, the International Ornithological Committee, and the Clements taxonomy adopted the new genus. However, as of December 2024 BirdLife International's Handbook of the Birds of the World retains the two species in genus Philodor.

Five subspecies are recognized:

- P. e. subfulvum Sclater, PL, 1862
- P. e. ochrogaster Hellmayr, 1917
- P. e. lyra Cherrie, 1916
- P. e. suboles Todd, 1948
- P. e. erythrocercum (Pelzeln, 1859)

Early in the twentieth century N. e. subfulvum was treated as a separate species. In the late twentieth century at least one taxonomic system treated N. e. erythrocercum as a separate species, and some authors advocate returning to that treatment. What is now the nominate subspecies of the slaty-winged foliage-gleaner (N. fuscipenne fuscipenne) was for a time treated as subspecies of the rufous-rumped.

== Description ==
The rufous-rumped foliage-gleaner is about 14 to 17 cm (5.5 to 6.7 in) long and weighs 18 to 31 g (0.63 to 1.1 oz). Male and female plumages are alike. Adults of the nominate subspecies have a pale tawny-buff eyering and supercilium on an otherwise dark fuscous brown face. Their crown and back are dark olive-brown and their rump and uppertail coverts bright chestnut. Their tail is bright rufous and their wings are dark olive-brown. Their throat is pale yellowish buff, their breast and belly medium brownish with an olive tinge, and their flanks and undertail coverts a slightly darker brownish with a dark rufescent tinge. Their iris is brown to dark brown, their maxilla blackish to brownish, their mandible horn-brown to pinkish gray, and their legs and feet grayish green to yellowish olive. Juveniles have a more rufous-orange supercilium, a more rufescent crown, and less yellowish underparts than adults.

Subspecies N. e. lyra is similar to the nominate but with a redder back, brighter and cinnamon-tinged upperwing coverts and flight feathers, and slightly more buffy underparts. It has some clinal variation. N. e. suboles is similar to lyra with paler underparts and more olivaceous flight feathers. N. e. subfulvum has a less rufous rump and slightly more ochraceous underparts than the nominate. N. e. ochrogaster differs the most from the nominate and the other subspecies. It has a brighter ochraceous supercilium and throat than they, a more rufous rump, and a tawny olivaceous tinge to its underparts.

== Distribution and habitat ==
The rufous-rumped foliage-gleaner is mostly a bird of the Amazon Basin. Its subspecies are found thus:

- P. e. subfulvum: Amazonia from southern Colombia south through eastern Ecuador into northern Peru
- P. e. ochrogaster: the Andes from central Peru south to north-central Bolivia
- P. e. lyra: eastern Peru south of the Amazon, Brazil south of the Amazon east to Maranhão and south to Mato Grosso, and northern Bolivia
- P. e. suboles: southeastern Colombia and northwestern Brazil north of the Amazon and east to the Rio Negro
- P. e. erythrocercum: the Guianas and northeastern Brazil north of the Amazon and east of the Rio Negro

The four Amazonian subspecies inhabit tropical evergreen forest, mainly terra firme but also várzea. In elevation they range as high as 1,300 m (4,300 ft). Subspecies N. e. ochrogaster inhabits montane evergreen forest at elevations between 800 and 1,650 m (2,600 and 5,400 ft).

== Behavior ==
=== Movement ===
The rufous-rumped foliage-gleaner is a year-round resident.

=== Feeding ===
The rufous-rumped foliage-gleaner feeds on a wide variety of arthropods. It forages singly and in pairs, usually as members of a mixed-species feeding flock. It feeds primarily in the subcanopy but regularly does so in the mid-story and canopy. It specializes in gleaning and pulling prey from dead leaves and also feeds at palm fronds and at debris in vine tangles. It often maneuvers acrobatically to reach prey.

=== Breeding ===
Little is known about the rufous-rumped foliage-gleaner's breeding biology. It nests during the dry season in French Guiana but its season elsewhere has not been defined. One nest was in a deep hole in a tree stump; it had a pad of wood fibers at the bottom and contained two eggs.

=== Vocalization ===
The rufous-rumped foliage-gleaner's song is "a slightly ascending and then descending series of 4–6 high notes, 'chu, chee, chee, chéé, chu' ". Its call is a "shrill 'wheeeeyk' and 'cheeyu' or 'chak' ".

== Status ==
The IUCN has assessed the rufous-rumped foliage-gleaner as being of Least Concern. It has a very large range; its population size is not known and is believed to be decreasing. No immediate threats have been identified. It is considered uncommon to fairly common in different parts of its range, and it occurs in many protected areas.
