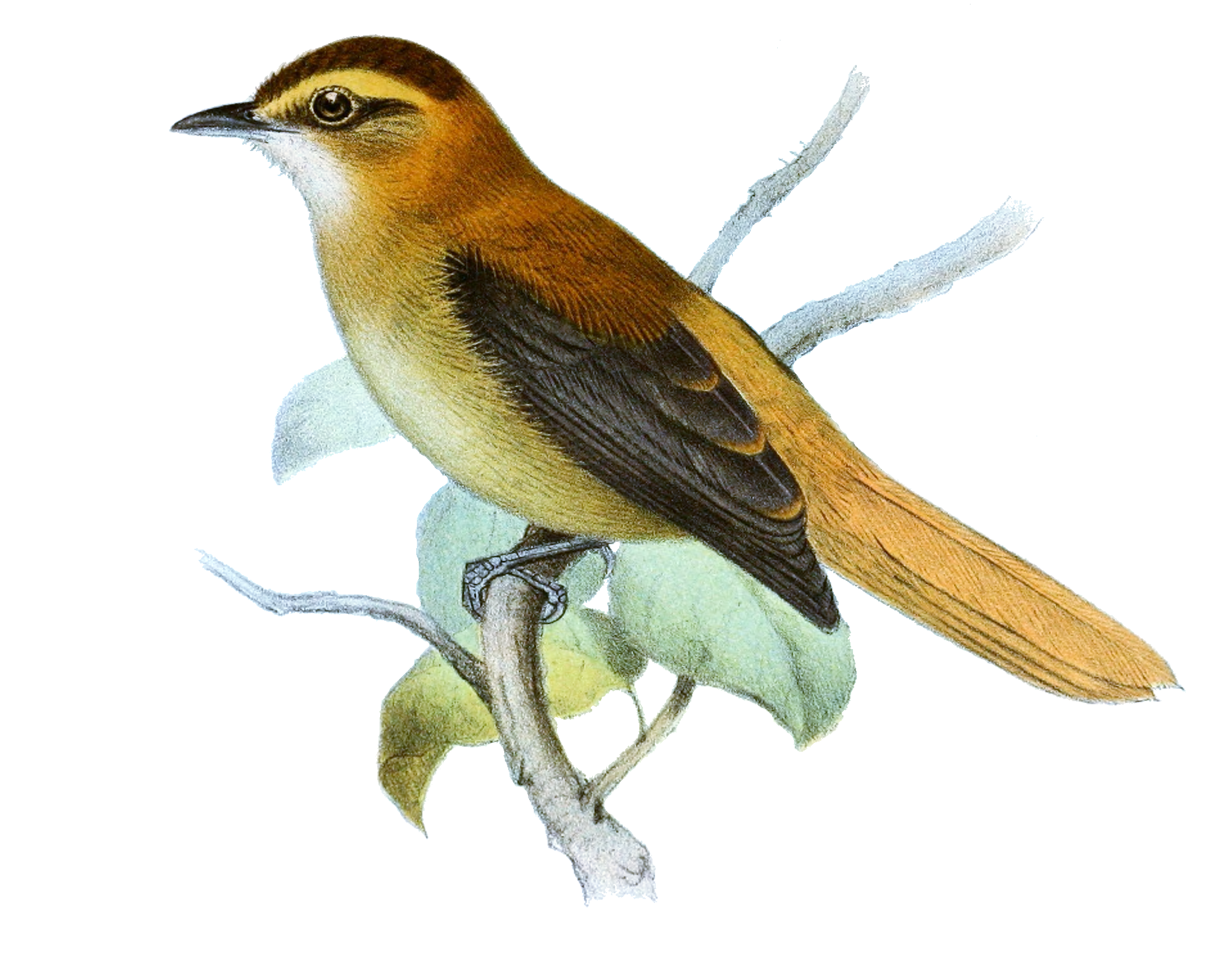
- Adult P. f. erythronotum

Conservation status
- Least Concern (IUCN 3.1)

Scientific classification
- Kingdom: Animalia
- Phylum: Chordata
- Class: Aves
- Order: Passeriformes
- Family: Furnariidae
- Genus: Neophilydor
- Species: N. fuscipenne

Binomial name
- Neophilydor fuscipenne (Salvin, 1866)

Synonyms
- Philydor fuscipennis

= Slaty-winged foliage-gleaner =

Species of bird

The slaty-winged foliage-gleaner (Neophilydor fuscipenne) is a species of bird in the Furnariinae subfamily of the ovenbird family Furnariidae. It is found in Colombia, Ecuador, and Panama.

== Taxonomy and systematics ==
The slaty-winged foliage-gleaner was formally described in 1866 by the English naturalist Osbert Salvin based on a specimen collected in the province of Veraguas in the Republic of Panama. He placed the species in the genus Philydor and coined the binomial name Philydor fuscipennis. The specific epithet combines the Latin fuscus meaning "dusky" or "dark" with -pennis meaning "-winged".

Studies published in 2011 and 2023 defined and resolved the polyphyly of the genus Philydor and proposed a new genus Neophilydor for the slaty-winged foliage-gleaner and rufous-rumped foliage-gleaner (N. erythrocercum). In 2024 the South American Classification Committee of the American Ornithological Society, the International Ornithological Committee, and the Clements taxonomy adopted the new genus. However, as of December 2024 BirdLife International's Handbook of the Birds of the World retains the two species in genus Philodor.

Two subspecies are recognized:

- N. f. fuscipenne (Salvin, 1866)
- N. f. erythronotum (Sclater, PL & Salvin, 1873)

The species has a complicated taxonomic history. Since about 1990 it has been assigned the two subspecies above. For a time N. f. erythronotum was treated as a separate species. Later, N. f. fuscipenne was treated as a subspecies of the rufous-rumped foliage-gleaner. The slaty-winged foliage-gleaner has two widely separated populations (see the Distribution section); that in Ecuador "probably represents an undescribed taxon".

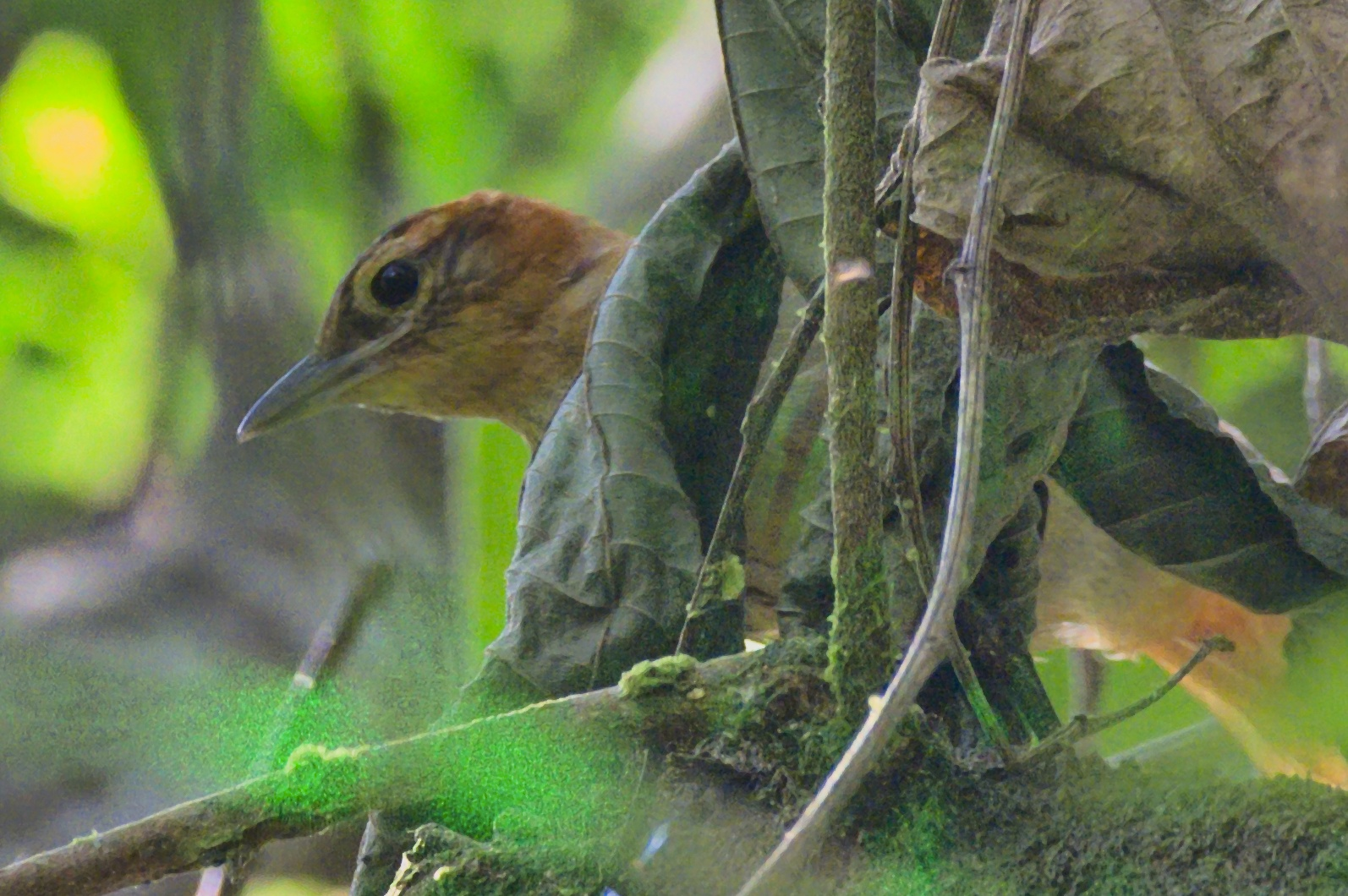
Slaty-winged foliage-gleaner

== Description ==
The slaty-winged foliage-gleaner is about 17 cm (6.7 in) long and weighs 25 to 28 g (0.88 to 0.99 oz). Male and female plumages are alike. Adults of the nominate subspecies N. f. fuscipenne have a pale rufescent ochre supercilium, a dark brownish band behind the eye, fuscous and buff lores, and dark brownish ear coverts with some rusty inclusions. Their crown is dark brown with faint rufescent streaks and they have an indistinct dark rusty-rufous collar. Their back is rich rufescent brown and their rump and uppertail coverts chestnut-rufous. Their tail is rufous-chestnut. Their wing coverts are brown, their primary coverts dark slaty brown, and their flight feathers slaty gray-brown. Their throat is variable but generally orangey to rusty, their breast is similar but a deeper rufescent in its center, their belly is paler than the breast, and their undertail coverts are darker rufescent brown or chestnut-brown. Their iris is brown, their maxilla gray to blackish, their mandible gray to horn, and their legs and feet gray-green to greenish yellow. Juveniles are much like adults but have more rufous upperparts and ochraceous underparts. Subspecies N. f. erythronotum is paler and duller overall than the nominate, though the Ecuadoran population has somewhat more ochraceous underparts.

== Distribution and habitat ==
The nominate subspecies of the slaty-winged foliage-gleaner is found in central Panama from Veraguas Province to the Canal Zone. Subspecies N. f. erythronotum has a disjunct distribution. One population is found from Panama's Panamá Province east into Colombia where it ranges east to Santander Department and south into Chocó Department. The other population is found in western Ecuador from Pichincha Province south to El Oro Province.

The slaty-winged foliage-gleaner inhabits humid lowland evergreen forest and also secondary forest. In elevation it mainly occurs between 500 and 1,000 m (1,600 and 3,300 ft). It reaches 1,600 m (5,200 ft) in Colombia but only 600 m (2,000 ft) in Ecuador.

== Behavior ==
=== Movement ===
The slaty-winged foliage-gleaner is a year-round resident.

=== Feeding ===
The slaty-winged foliage-gleaner feeds on arthropods. Orthoptera, Coleoptera, and spiders are major components of its diet, though other insects and even small lizards are also eaten. It forages singly and in pairs, usually as members of a mixed-species feeding flock. It feeds primarily from the forest's undergrowth to its mid-storey. It acrobatically climbs along and up branches, gleaning its prey from dead leaves and epiphytes.

=== Breeding ===
Nothing is known about the slaty-winged foliage-gleaner's breeding biology.

=== Vocalization ===
The slaty-winged foliage-gleaner's song is "a monotonic accelerating trill". Its contact call is "a sharp 'chef' ".

== Status ==
The IUCN has assessed the slaty-winged foliage-gleaner as being of Least Concern. It has a large range and an estimated population of at least 20,000 mature individuals, though the latter is believed to be decreasing. No immediate threats have been identified. It is considered uncommon to locally fairly common in Panama, locally common in Colombia, and scarce and local in Ecuador. The Ecuadoran population is "considered vulnerable because of extensive destruction of lowland forests".
