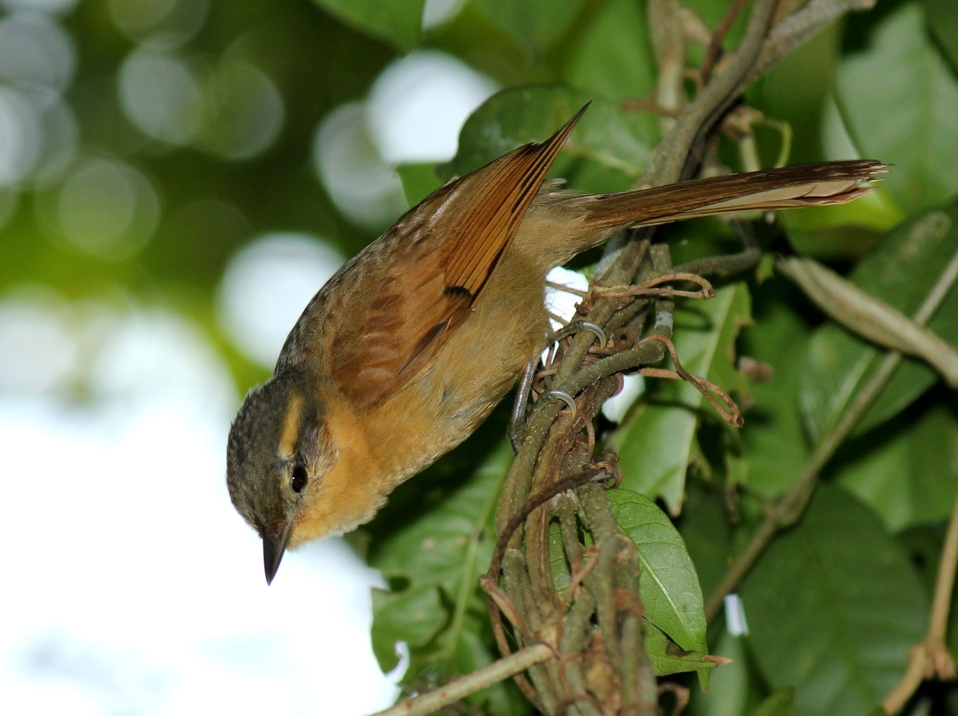
- At São Sebastião, São Paulo, Brazil

Conservation status
- Least Concern (IUCN 3.1)

Scientific classification
- Kingdom: Animalia
- Phylum: Chordata
- Class: Aves
- Order: Passeriformes
- Family: Furnariidae
- Genus: Anabacerthia
- Species: A. lichtensteini

Binomial name
- Anabacerthia lichtensteini (Cabanis & Heine, 1860)

Synonyms
- Philydor lichtensteini

= Ochre-breasted foliage-gleaner =

Species of bird

The ochre-breasted foliage-gleaner (Anabacerthia lichtensteini) is a species of bird in the Furnariinae subfamily of the ovenbird family Furnariidae. It is found in Argentina, Brazil, and Paraguay.

== Taxonomy and systematics ==
The ochre-breasted foliage-gleaner was previously included in genus Philydor but a 2011 paper made it plain that it did not belong there. The same paper found the white-browed foliage-gleaner (A. amaurotis) and the ochre-breasted to be sister species.

The ochre-breasted foliage gleaner is monotypic.

== Description ==
The ochre-breasted foliage-gleaner is 15 to 17 cm (5.9 to 6.7 in) long and weighs 18 to 24 g (0.63 to 0.85 oz). It is a medium-sized furnariid with a wedge-shaped bill that is the shortest in its genus. The sexes have the same plumage. Adults have an ochraceous eye ring and sharply defined supercilium, a dark brownish band behind the eye, dull rufous-ochre ear coverts, and pale brownish lores. Their crown is dull gray-brown with vague paler streaks, their back rufescent brown, and their rump and uppertail coverts a slightly lighter rufescent brown. Their tail is mostly rufous with rufescent brown outer webs on the innermost pair of feathers. Their wings are rufous brown with duskier tips on the flight feathers. Their throat and malar area are bright ochraceous buff, their upper breast a richer ocraceous buff, and the rest of their underparts a duller ocraceous buff. Their iris is brown, their maxilla brownish gray, their mandible light gray, and their legs and feet greenish gray. Juveniles have less uniformly colored underparts than adults, and those feathers have grayish tips.

== Distribution and habitat ==
The ochre-breasted foliage-gleaner is found in southeastern Brazil from Bahia, Goiás, and Mato Grosso do Sul south into Rio Grande do Sul, in eastern Paraguay, and in northeastern Argentina's Misiones Province. It inhabits montane evergreen forest and tall secondary forest. In elevation it ranges from sea level to 800 m (2,600 ft).

== Behavior ==
=== Movement ===
The ochre-breasted foliage-gleaner is a year-round resident throughout its range.

=== Feeding ===
The ochre-breasted foliage-gleaner feeds on arthropods. It usually forages as part of mixed-species feeding flocks, and usually from the forest's mid-storey to its canopy. It acrobatically gleans and pulls for its prey in dead leaves, debris, and branches.

=== Breeding ===
Nothing is known about the ochre-breasted foliage-gleaner's breeding biology.

=== Vocalization ===
The ochre-breasted foliage-gleaner's song is a "series of up to 10 estr. high, piercing 'zipzip---' notes". Its call is a "short, very high, inhaled trill".

== Status ==
The IUCN originally assessed the ochre-breasted foliage-gleaner as Near Threatened but since 2004 has classed it as being of Least Concern. It has a large range but its population size is not known and is believed to be decreasing. No immediate threats have been identified. It is considered uncommon to common in different parts of its range. It occurs in several protected areas. "Extensive deforestation within its relatively small range has dramatically reduced [the] amount of available habitat; nevertheless, [the species] seems able to persist in degraded forest fragments."
