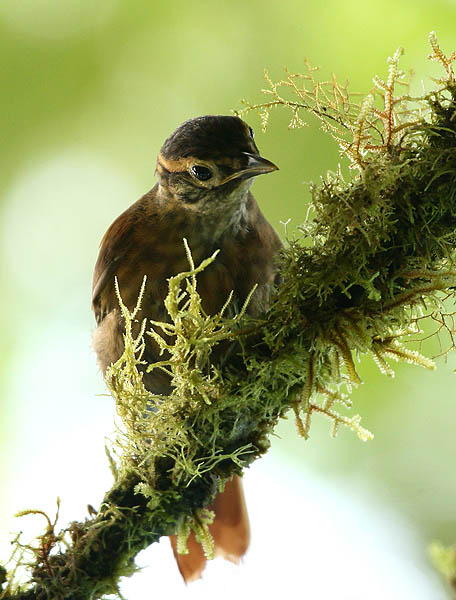
- Scaly-throated foliage-gleaner

Scientific classification
- Kingdom: Animalia
- Phylum: Chordata
- Class: Aves
- Order: Passeriformes
- Family: Furnariidae
- Genus: Anabacerthia; Lafresnaye, 1841

Type species
- Anabacerthia striaticollis Lafresnaye, 1840

Species
- 5, see text

= Anabacerthia =

Genus of birds

Anabacerthia is a genus of birds in the ovenbird family Furnariidae.

Within the ovenbird family the members of this genus are most closely related to the foliage-gleaners in the genus Syndactyla.

The genus contains the following five species:

- White-browed foliage-gleaner, Anabacerthia amaurotis
- Scaly-throated foliage-gleaner, Anabacerthia variegaticeps
- Montane foliage-gleaner, Anabacerthia striaticollis
- Rufous-tailed foliage-gleaner, Anabacerthia ruficaudata
- Ochre-breasted foliage-gleaner, Anabacerthia lichtensteini
