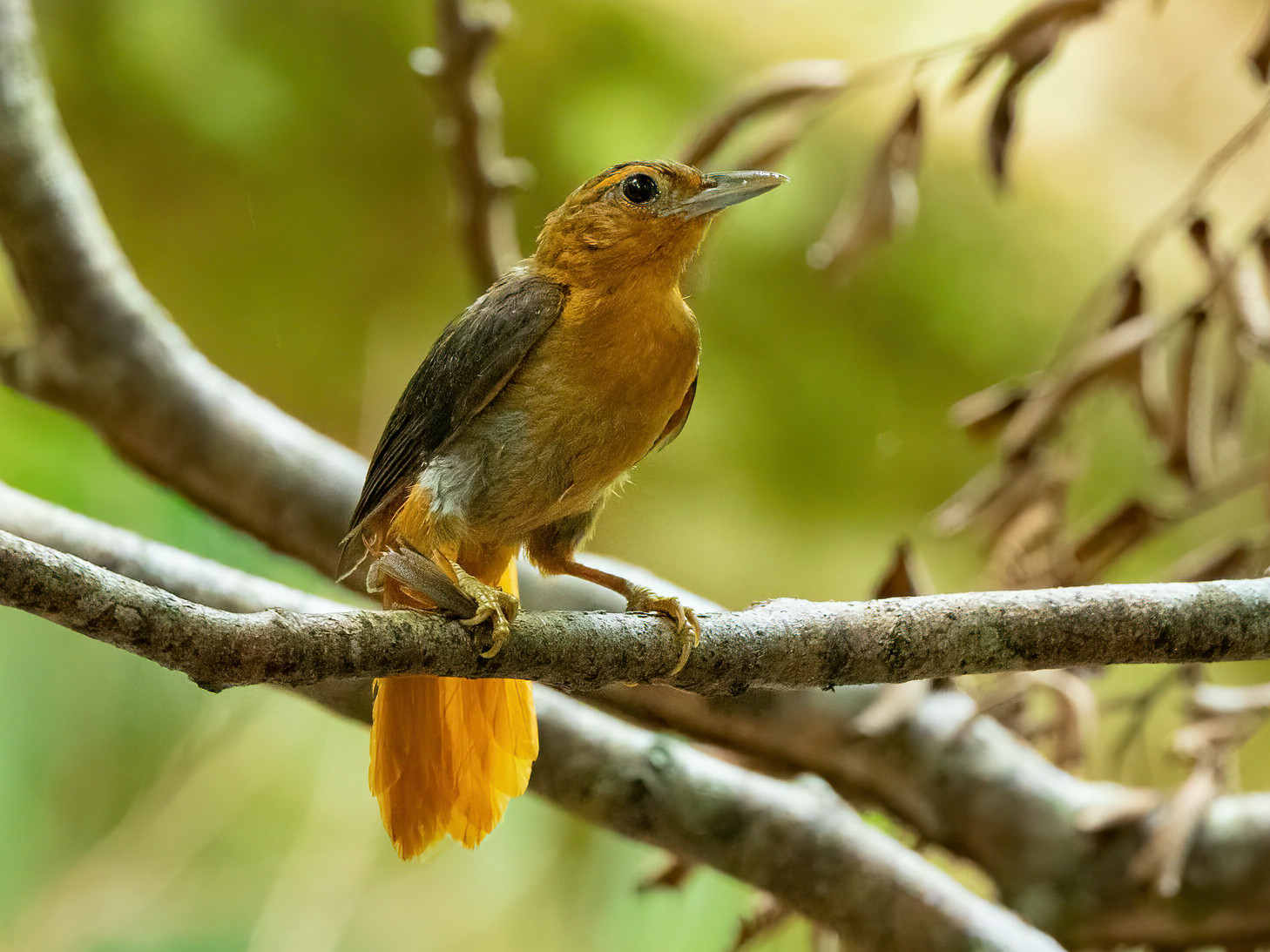

Conservation status
- Least Concern (IUCN 3.1)

Scientific classification
- Kingdom: Animalia
- Phylum: Chordata
- Class: Aves
- Order: Passeriformes
- Family: Furnariidae
- Genus: Philydor
- Species: P. pyrrhodes

Binomial name
- Philydor pyrrhodes (Cabanis, 1849)

= Cinnamon-rumped foliage-gleaner =

Species of bird

The cinnamon-rumped foliage-gleaner (Philydor pyrrhodes) is a species of bird in the Furnariinae subfamily of the ovenbird family Furnariidae. It is found in every mainland South American country except Argentina, Chile, Paraguay, and Uruguay.

== Taxonomy and systematics ==
The cinnamon-rumped foliage-gleaner is monotypic.

== Description ==
The cinnamon-rumped foliage-gleaner is 14 to 17 cm (5.5 to 6.7 in) long and weighs 24 to 35 g (0.85 to 1.2 oz). The sexes have the same plumage, with the brightest underparts of its genus. Adults have an ochraceous eyering and supercilium, a weak rufescent brown band behind the eye, dull rufescent brownish lores, and rufescent brown ear coverts. Their crown is dark rufescent brown with a faint darker scalloped effect. Their back is rufescent brown, their rump rufous, and their uppertail coverts and tail bright orange-rufous. Their wings are dark fuscous brown. Their chin, throat, breast, belly, and undertail coverts are bright orange ochraceous. Their iris is brown to dark brown, their maxilla dark gray to blackish, their mandible dark gray to silvery gray, and their legs and feet olive-greenish to yellowish olive. Juveniles have browner upperparts and a paler and less rufescent throat than adults.

== Distribution and habitat ==
The cinnamon-rumped foliage-gleaner is found from southeastern Colombia east through southern Venezuela and the Guianas, south through eastern Ecuador and eastern Peru into northern Bolivia, and from there east through Brazil to Pará and Maranhão and south to Mato Grosso. It inhabits tropical lowland and flooded evergreen forest, terra firme forest, and várzea forest. It favors areas with many palms. In elevation it mostly occurs below 400 m (1,300 ft) but reaches 600 m (2,000 ft) in Colombia and 500 m (1,600 ft) in Brazil.

== Behavior ==
=== Movement ===
The cinnamon-rumped foliage-gleaner is a year-round resident throughout its range.

=== Feeding ===
The cinnamon-rumped foliage-gleaner's diet has not been fully described but includes arthropods. It forages singly and in pairs and occasionally joins mixed-species feeding flocks. It mostly forages in the forest's undergrowth though it will do so as high as the subcanopy. It acrobatically gleans and pulls its prey from live and dead leaves, debris, and palm fronds. It most often feeds in dense cover.

=== Breeding ===
Nothing is known about the cinnamon-rumped foliage-gleaner's breeding biology.

=== Vocalization ===
The cinnamon-rumped foliage-gleaner's song is a complex "long low trill, gradually becoming louder, then breaking into louder, vibrating, evenly ascending trill that ends abruptly". Its contact call is described as "a low, loud, explosive 'chack', 'chakit' or 'chichid' ".

== Status ==
The IUCN has assessed the cinnamon-rumped foliage-gleaner as being of Least Concern. It has a very large range, and though its population size is not known it is believed to be stable. No immediate threats have been identified. It is considered rare to uncommon across its range. It occurs in several protected areas.
