= Alagoas foliage-gleaner =

Conservation status
- Extinct (2011) (IUCN 3.1)

Scientific classification
- Kingdom: Animalia
- Phylum: Chordata
- Class: Aves
- Order: Passeriformes
- Family: Furnariidae
- Genus: Philydor
- Species: †P. novaesi

Binomial name
- †Philydor novaesi Teixeira & Gonzaga, 1983

Extinct species of bird in Brazil

The Alagoas foliage-gleaner (Philydor novaesi) is an extinct passerine bird in the Furnariinae subfamily of the ovenbird family Furnariidae. It was endemic to Brazil.

== Taxonomy and systematics ==
The Alagoas foliage-gleaner was first collected in 1979 at Murici in Alagoas and was formally described in 1983. Based on its morphology and observed behavior it was placed in genus Philydor. It and the very similar black-capped foliage-gleaner (P. atricapillus) are treated as a superspecies.

The Alagoas foliage-gleaner's specific epithet commemorates the Brazilian ornithologist Fernando da Costa Novaes.

== Observational history ==
The Alagoas foliage-gleaner was discovered in 1979 in Murici, Alagoas. Between then and 2009 at least five further sightings came from that site; one was of four individuals and the others of one each. In 2003 up to four were seen at a second site, the private preserve RPPN Frei Caneca in Pernambuco, about 50 km (31 mi) north of Murici. There was one undocumented sighting at a private preserve adjoining Frei Caneca in 2004. Sightings, some accompanied by photographs and sound recordings, continued at Frei Caneca until 2011. The last documented sighting of the species was there on September 13, 2011, when the bird was video recorded. The last apparent sighting was also at Frei Caneca, in April 2012, but it was not documented.

== Description ==
The Alagoas foliage-gleaner's dimensions and weights were recorded from three male and one female specimens, all adults. The four ranged from 19.3 to 20 cm (7.6 to 7.9 in) long. The males weighed 32 to 34 g (1.1 to 1.2 oz) and the female 30 g (1.1 oz). The species' plumage was described from the specimens, photographs, and sight records. The sexes have the same plumage. Adults have a pale buff eyering and supercilium, a blackish-brown band behind the eye, dull buffy rufous lores, and pale buff ear coverts with a blackish-brown band below them. Their crown is dark brown with faint spots on the forehead and faint streaks in its center. Their back is dull rufous-brown, their rump slightly more rufous, and their uppertail coverts an even brighter rufous. Their tail is bright rufous. Their wings are dark rufous-brown with darker coverts and dark fuscous tips on the flight feathers. Their chin, throat, and most of their underparts are dull rufescent; their flanks are slightly duller and their undertail coverts more rufous. Their iris is brown, their maxilla blackish, their mandible ivory, and their legs and feet greenish horn. Juveniles are undescribed.

== Distribution and habitat ==
The Alagoas foliage-gleaner is positively known only from Murici and Frei Caneca, with an undocumented sight record from a site adjacent to Frei Caneca. The habitat at these sites is somewhat hilly tropical evergreen forest and secondary forest. The forests are characterized by many vine tangles, bromeliads, mosses, and orchids. In elevation they range between 400 and 550 m (1,300 and 1,800 ft).

== Behavior ==
=== Movement ===
As far as is known, the Alagoas foliage-gleaner was non-migratory.

=== Feeding ===
The Alagoas foliage-gleaner was most often observed as single or paired birds within mixed-species foraging flocks. It was documented feeding on adult and larval insects of several orders. It moved actively and acrobatically between branches and among vine tangles. It captured prey by gleaning from live and dead leaves, bark, and debris. It often vigorously pulled apart clusters of dead leaves and was observed hammering at branches with its bill and pulling larvae from dead wood. It fed at all levels of the forest from the understory to the crown.

=== Breeding ===
Almost nothing is known about the Alagoas foliage-gleaners breeding biology. An immature bird was collected in January.

=== Vocalization ===
The Alagoas foliage-gleaner's song is "a high-pitched rattle descending slightly in pitch and lasting 3–5 sec". "One call is described as a thürr, thoor, or theer, another as a descending uüarrr, uüarr ".

== Status ==
The IUCN initially assessed the Alagoas foliage-gleaner in 1988 as Threatened. In 1994 it was uplisted to Critically Endangered. Following the recommendation of a 2018 study, in 2019 the IUCN declared it Extinct as of 2011. Brazilian authorities had declared it extinct in 2014. The two sites where the species was known are small fragments of the formerly extensive Atlantic Forest, which has been almost totally cleared for timber, charcoal, grazing, and sugar cane production. What is left is threatened by illegal clearing, fire, and the warming effects of climate change.
