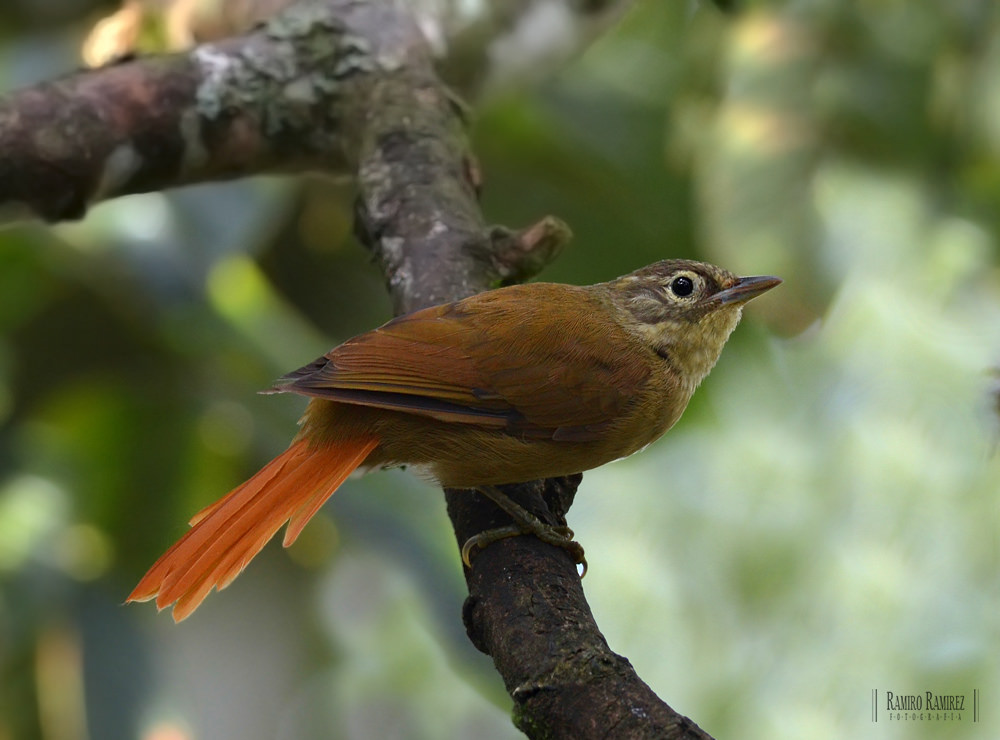

Conservation status
- Least Concern (IUCN 3.1)

Scientific classification
- Kingdom: Animalia
- Phylum: Chordata
- Class: Aves
- Order: Passeriformes
- Family: Furnariidae
- Genus: Anabacerthia
- Species: A. striaticollis

Binomial name
- Anabacerthia striaticollis Lafresnaye, 1841

= Montane foliage-gleaner =

Species of bird found in South America

The montane foliage-gleaner (Anabacerthia striaticollis) is a species of bird in the Furnariinae subfamily of the ovenbird family Furnariidae. It is found in Bolivia, Colombia, Ecuador, Peru, and Venezuela.

== Taxonomy and systematics ==
The montane foliage-gleaner has these six subspecies:

- A. s. anxia (Bangs, 1902)
- A. s. perijana Phelps, WH & Phelps, WH Jr, 1952
- A. s. venezuelana (Hellmayr, 1911)
- A. s. striaticollis Lafresnaye, 1841
- A. s. montana (Tschudi, 1844)
- A. s. yungae (Chapman, 1923)

Some authors in the early twentieth century treated the montane foliage-gleaner and the scaly-throated foliage-gleaner (A. variegaticeps) as conspecific. Later they were considered to form a superspecies but by the early 2000s it was determined that they are not even sister species.

== Description ==
The montane foliage-gleaner is 16 to 17 cm (6.3 to 6.7 in) long and weighs 22 to 28 g (0.78 to 0.99 oz). It is a medium-sized furnariid with a wedge-shaped bill. The sexes have the same plumage. Adults of the nominate subspecies A. s. striaticollis have a mostly dark brown face with some pale flecks and a wide pale tawny-buff eyering that extends as a streak behind the eye. Their crown, nape, and upper back are dull dark brown with a hint of buff spots. The rest of their back and rump are rich brown and their uppertail coverts are a slightly paler brown. Their tail is rufous with bare shafts at the very end of the feathers. Their wings are mostly rich rufescent brown. Their chin and throat are pale tawny-buff with brown flecks on the chin. Their breast is light brown with blurry buff streaks, their belly unstreaked medium brown, and their flanks slightly darker brown with a rufescent tinge. Their iris is brown to dark brown, their bill grayish horn to olive-gray whose mandible is sometimes lighter, and their legs and feet yellowish brown. Juveniles have a darker crown, a more prominent eyering, and are overall more rufous than adults.

Subspecies A. s. anxia's eyering, postocular stripe, throat, and breast are more yellowish buff than the nominate's, and its uppertail coverts are the same rufous as the tail. A. s. perijana is paler than the nominate, with a more yellowish brown back, yellowish throat, and more yellowish olive underparts. Compared to the other subspecies, A. s. venezuelana has a grayer crown, a browner back, and more grayish brown breast and belly, with rufous uppertail coverts and a whitish throat. A. s. montana has a browner crown than the nominate with a darker and more rufescent back, a more chestnut tail, and more prominent streaks on the breast. A. s. yungae is more reddish overall than the nominate, with a darker and unstreaked crown. Both montana and yungae exhibit clinal variation.

== Distribution and habitat ==
The subspecies of the montane foliage-gleaner are found thus:

- A. s. anxia: northern Colombia's Sierra Nevada de Santa Marta
- A. s. perijana: the Serranía del Perijá on the Venezuela/Colombia border
- A. s. venezuelana: coastal and near-coastal mountains of north-central Venezuela
- A. s. striaticollis: Andes of western Venezuela and all three Andean ranges of Colombia
- A. s. montana: eastern slope of the Andes from Colombia's Nariño Department south through eastern Ecuador into eastern Peru as far as the Department of Junín
- A. s. yungae: eastern slope of the Andes from the Department of Cuzco in Peru south into Bolivia as far as Santa Cruz Department

The montane foliage-gleaner inhabits montane evergreen forest in the subtropical and foothill zones. In elevation it mostly ranges between 900 and 2,300 m (3,000 and 7,500 ft) though it reaches 2,800 m (9,200 ft) in Colombia. In Ecuador its range has a narrower 1,000 to 1,800 m (3,300 to 5,900 ft) span, and in Peru it occurs as low as 750 m (2,500 ft).

== Behavior ==
=== Movement ===
The montane foliage-gleaner is a year-round resident throughout its range.

=== Feeding ===
The montane foliage-gleaner feeds on arthropods. It forages singly and in pairs, usually as part of mixed-species feeding flocks. It mostly forages from the forest's mid-storey to its subcanopy. It clambers and hops along horizontal branches as it acrobatically gleans its prey from dead leaves, debris, epiphytes, and moss.

=== Breeding ===
The montane foliage-gleaner is assumed to be monogamous. The two known nests were in holes in a palm stump and a dead tree that were lined with lichens and moss. The clutches were of two eggs. Nothing else is known about the species' breeding biology.

=== Vocalization ===
The montane foliage-gleaner's song and calls appear to vary little across its range. One description is "an accelerating, belaboured series of staccato, high-pitched, ticking, squeaky, dry 'peck' or 'tchik' notes, roughly on same pitch, sometimes descending slightly at end, sometimes ending abruptly". Its call is "a high, squeaky, sharp 'chit' or 'tchik' ", and it also gives a "scratchy rattle".

== Status ==
The IUCN has assessed the montane foliage-gleaner as being of Least Concern. It has a very large range, and though its population size is not known it is believed to be stable. No immediate threats have been identified. It is considered fairly common to common and occurs in several protected areas.
