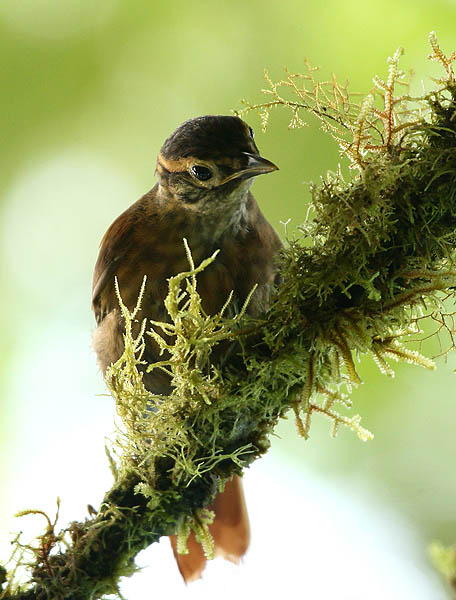

Conservation status
- Least Concern (IUCN 3.1)

Scientific classification
- Kingdom: Animalia
- Phylum: Chordata
- Class: Aves
- Order: Passeriformes
- Family: Furnariidae
- Genus: Anabacerthia
- Species: A. variegaticeps

Binomial name
- Anabacerthia variegaticeps (Sclater, PL, 1857)

= Scaly-throated foliage-gleaner =

Species of bird

The scaly-throated foliage-gleaner (Anabacerthia variegaticeps), also known as the spectacled foliage-gleaner, is a species of bird in the Furnariinae subfamily of the ovenbird family Furnariidae. It is found in Mexico, in every Central American country except Nicaragua, and in Colombia and Ecuador.

== Taxonomy and systematics ==
The scaly-throated foliage-gleaner's taxonomy is unsettled. The International Ornithological Committee and BirdLife International's Handbook of the Birds of the World recognize three subspecies, the nominate A. v. variegaticeps (Sclater, PL, 1857), A. v. schaldachi (Winker, 1997), and A. v. temporalis (Sclater, 1859). The Clements taxonomy does not recognize A. v. schaldachi but includes it within the nominate.

Some authors in the early twentieth century treated the scaly-breasted foliage-gleaner and the montane foliage-gleaner (A. striaticollis) as conspecific. Later they were considered to form a superspecies but by the early 2000s it was determined that they are not even sister species. Other authors have suggested that temporalis should be treated as a separate species, and yet other authors have suggested that it is better treated as a subspecies of the montane foliage-gleaner.

This article follows the three-subspecies model.

== Description ==
The scaly-throated foliage-gleaner is 15 to 17 cm (5.9 to 6.7 in) long and weighs 19 to 25 g (0.67 to 0.88 oz). It is a medium-sized furnariid with a wedge-shaped bill. The sexes have the same plumage. Adults of the nominate subspecies have a wide ocraceous buff eyering and supercilium and a dark brown line behind the eye. Their lores and ear coverts are dark brown and dull buff with sometimes a reddish wash. Their crown is dull grayish brown with faint buff streaks, their nape and upper back dark dull brown, and the rest of their back, rump, and uppertail coverts rich rufescent brown. Their tail is chestnut. Their wings are mostly rich rufescent brown, with dark brown and rufescent brown primary coverts. Their throat and the sides of their neck are pale whitish buff with a faint scalloped appearance. Their breast is light brown with faint scallops and streaks, their belly unstreaked medium brown, and their flanks and undertail coverts a darker brown with a rufescent tinge. Their iris is brown, their maxilla dark fuscous to dark gray-brown, their mandible dull greenish horn to grayish, and their legs and feet dull yellowish green to olive-green. Juveniles have a more pronounced scaly pattern on their throat and breast than the nominate, and a more ochraceous breast and belly. Subspecies A. v. schaldachi has a grayer crown, grayer (less rufescent) upperparts, and less scalloping on the throat than the nominate. A. v. temporalis differs significantly from the nominate. It is much darker and more heavily marked overall, with almost blackish marking on the face, conspicuous streaks on the crown, a more chestnut back, and blurry rich brown and ochraceous streaks on the breast.

== Distribution and habitat ==
Subspecies A. v. schaldachi of the scaly-throated foliage-gleaner is found in southwestern Mexico. The nominate subspecies is found discontinuously from southern Mexico to western Panama, skipping Venezuela. A. v. temporalis is found in Colombia's Western Andes and south on the western slope of the Andes and coastal mountains through Ecuador almost to Peru. Its habitat varies geographically. In northern Central America it occurs in semi-deciduous forest, rainforest, and cloudforest, mostly at elevations between 350 and 2,500 m (1,100 and 8,200 ft) and locally higher and lower. In Costa Rica it mostly occurs between 800 and 1,800 m (2,600 and 5,900 ft). In Colombia and Ecuador it occurs in montane evergreen forest in the foothills and subtropical zones, at elevations between 600 and 2,000 m (2,000 and 6,600 ft) in Colombia and 700 and 1,700 m (2,300 and 5,600 ft) in Ecuador.

== Behavior ==
=== Movement ===
The scaly-throated foliage-gleaner is mostly resident throughout its range but in some areas moves downslope after breeding.

=== Feeding ===
The scaly-throated foliage-gleaner feeds on a wide variety of arthropods. It forages singly and in pairs, usually as part of mixed-species feeding flocks. It forages at all levels of the forest from its understory to its canopy. It clambers and hops along horizontal branches as it acrobatically gleans its prey from foliage, epiphytes, and moss.

=== Breeding ===
The scaly-throated foliage-gleaner is assumed to be monogamous. The one known nest was in an abandoned woodpecker hole in a tree with a thick layer of moss in the bottom. The clutch was of two eggs. Nothing else is known about the species' breeding biology.

=== Vocalization ===
The scaly-throated foliage-gleaner's song has variously been described as "15–20 squeaky, sharp 'squeak' or 'skew' notes that lasts several seconds, sometimes ascending and then descending", "a trilling tser'u'u'u'u!", and "a fast-paced, evenly pitched series of up to 15-20 piercing and harsh 'skee' or 'tjik' notes". Its calls include "an explosive, dry 'squeak!' or 'squeer!'; peculiar scratchy rattle, and scratchy, squeaky 'kweeeah' ".

== Status ==
The IUCN has assessed the scaly-throated foliage-gleaner as being of Least Concern. It has a very large range and an estimated population of at least 50,000 mature individuals, though the latter is believed to be decreasing. No immediate threats have been identified. It is considered uncommon to common in various parts of its range. It occurs in several protected areas and also accepts fragmented forest.
