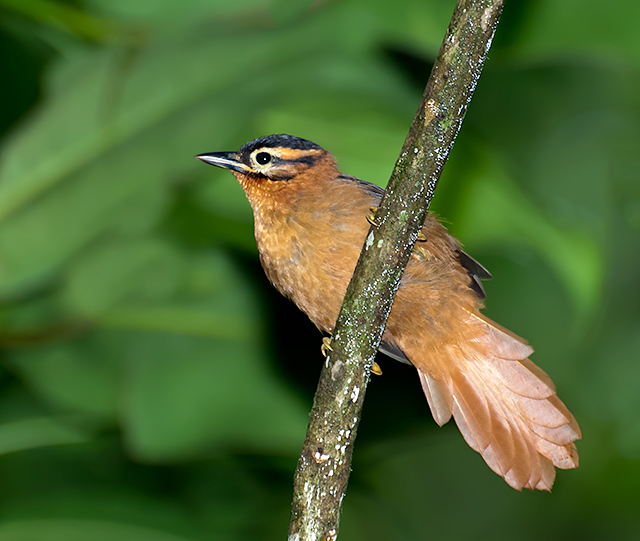
- At Registro, São Paulo State, Brazil

Conservation status
- Least Concern (IUCN 3.1)

Scientific classification
- Kingdom: Animalia
- Phylum: Chordata
- Class: Aves
- Order: Passeriformes
- Family: Furnariidae
- Genus: Philydor
- Species: P. atricapillus

Binomial name
- Philydor atricapillus (Wied, 1821)

= Black-capped foliage-gleaner =

Species of bird

The black-capped foliage-gleaner (Philydor atricapillus) is a species of bird in the Furnariinae subfamily of the ovenbird family Furnariidae. It is found in Argentina, Brazil, and Paraguay.

== Taxonomy and systematics ==
The black-capped foliage-gleaner is monotypic. It and the Alagoas foliage-gleaner (P. novaesi) form a superspecies.

== Description ==
The black-capped foliage-gleaner is 16 to 17 cm (6.3 to 6.7 in) long and weighs 17 to 27 g (0.60 to 0.95 oz). The sexes have the same plumage, with a very dramatic facial pattern. Adults have a wide pale buff eyering, a pale buff supercilium that is more orange-rufous to the rear, a blackish-brown band behind the eye, dull buffy rufous lores, and pale buff ear coverts with blackish-brown bands above and below them. Their crown is dark brown with faint spots on the forehead and faint streaks in its center. Their back is rich rufous-brown, their rump slightly paler but more rufous, and their uppertail coverts bright orange-rufous. Their tail is bright rufous. Their wings are mostly rich brown with darker coverts and dark fuscous tips on the flight feathers. Their chin, throat, and malar area are light orange-rufous. Their breast and belly are plain dark orange-rufous; their flanks are slightly duller and their undertail coverts bright rufous. Their iris is brown, their maxilla blackish, their mandible pale gray to greenish gray, and their legs and feet pale ochre-yellow to light olive-gray. Juveniles are much like adults but with dark brown edges on their underparts' feathers.

== Distribution and habitat ==
The black-capped foliage-gleaner is found from Bahia in Brazil south through Mato Grosso do Sul and Rio Grande do Sul and eastern Paraguay slightly into northeastern Argentina's Misiones Province. It inhabits tropical evergreen forest and mature secondary forest between sea level and about 1,000 m (3,300 ft) of elevation.

== Behavior ==
=== Movement ===
The black-capped foliage-gleaner is a year-round resident throughout its range.

=== Feeding ===
The black-capped foliage-gleaner feeds on a wide variety of adult and larval arthropods with a preference for adult Lepidoptera. Lesser components of its diet include Coleoptera and spiders, and it seldom feeds on ants. Single birds and pairs often join mixed-species foraging flocks, feeding at all levels of the forest from its understory to its canopy. It acrobatically works its way along branches, gleaning and pulling prey live and dead leaves, bark, debris, and bark crevices. It especially favors bromeliads as prey sources.

=== Breeding ===
Almost nothing is known about the black-capped foliage-gleaner's breeding biology. Anecdotal reports place its nest in a hole in an earthen bank.

=== Vocalization ===
The black-capped foliage-gleaners song is "a somewhat musical, whistled, fast, sharply descending trill" described in more detail as a "rapid series of 6-8 very high notes, the 1st 2 lower...the last 2 slightly lower still". Its calls include an "irregular series of squeaky notes, and 'pit-wit' " and a "very high, metallic sounding 'zic' ".

== Status ==
The IUCN initially assessed the black-capped foliage-gleaner in 1988 as Near Threatened but since 2000 has rated it as being of Least Concern. It has a large range but its population size is not known and is believed to be decreasing. No immediate threats have been identified. It is considered uncommon to fairly common in Brazil and is found there in several protected areas. It is considered rare in Paraguay but does occur in at least two protected areas. In Argentina it is found in Iguazú National Park. Though "deforestation within its relatively small range has dramatically reduced the area of this species' habitat...[it seems] able to persist in small forest fragments and in moderately degraded forest."
