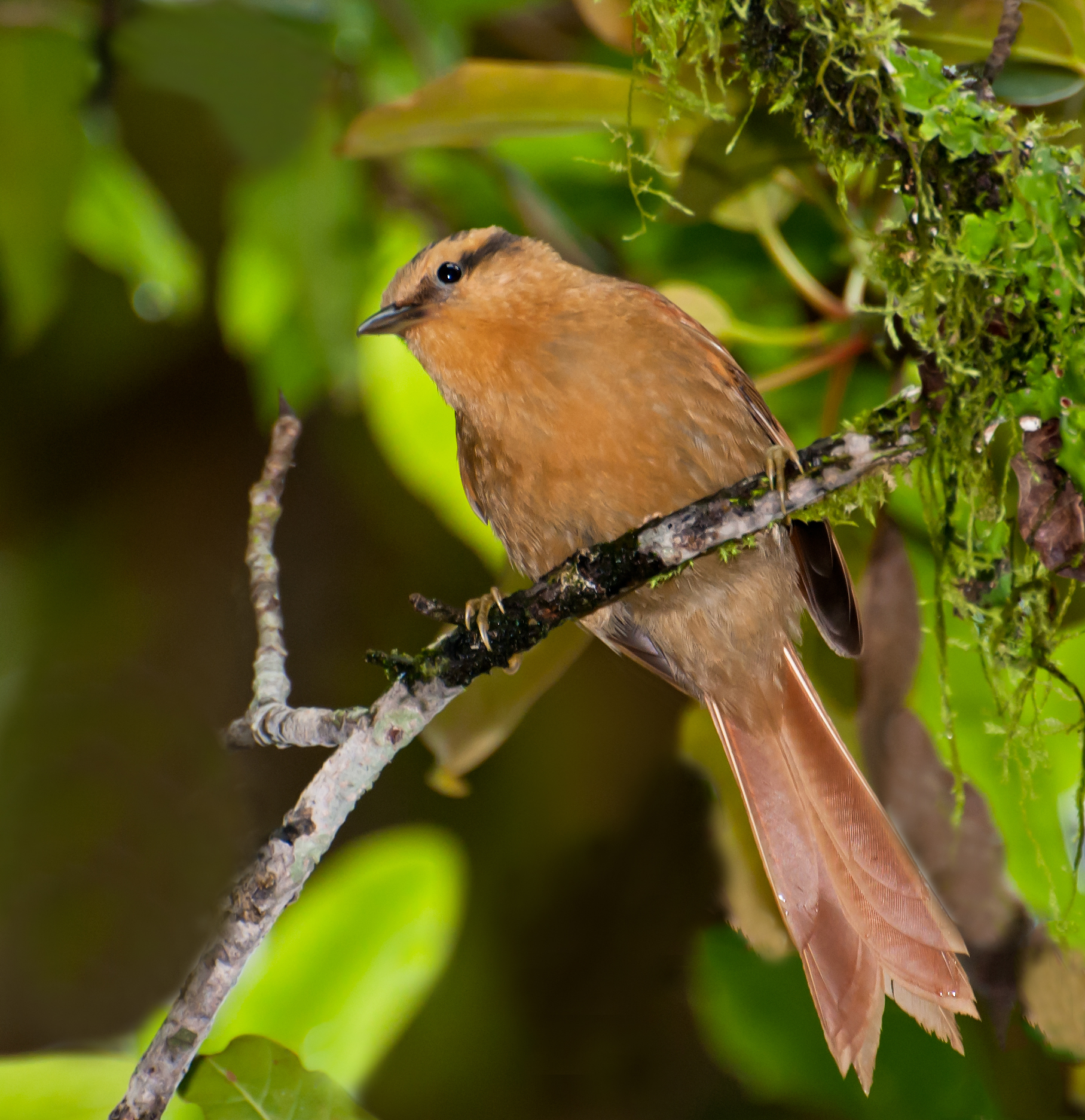
- A buff-fronted foliage-gleaner at Reserva Guainumbi, São Luis do Paraitinga, São Paulo, Brazil

Scientific classification
- Kingdom: Animalia
- Phylum: Chordata
- Class: Aves
- Order: Passeriformes
- Family: Furnariidae
- Genus: Dendroma; Swainson, 1837

Species
- 2, see text

= Dendroma =

Genus of birds

Dendroma is a genus of foliage-gleaners, birds in the ovenbird family Furnariidae. It contains the following species:

- Chestnut-winged foliage-gleaner, Dendroma erythroptera
- Buff-fronted foliage-gleaner, Dendroma rufa
