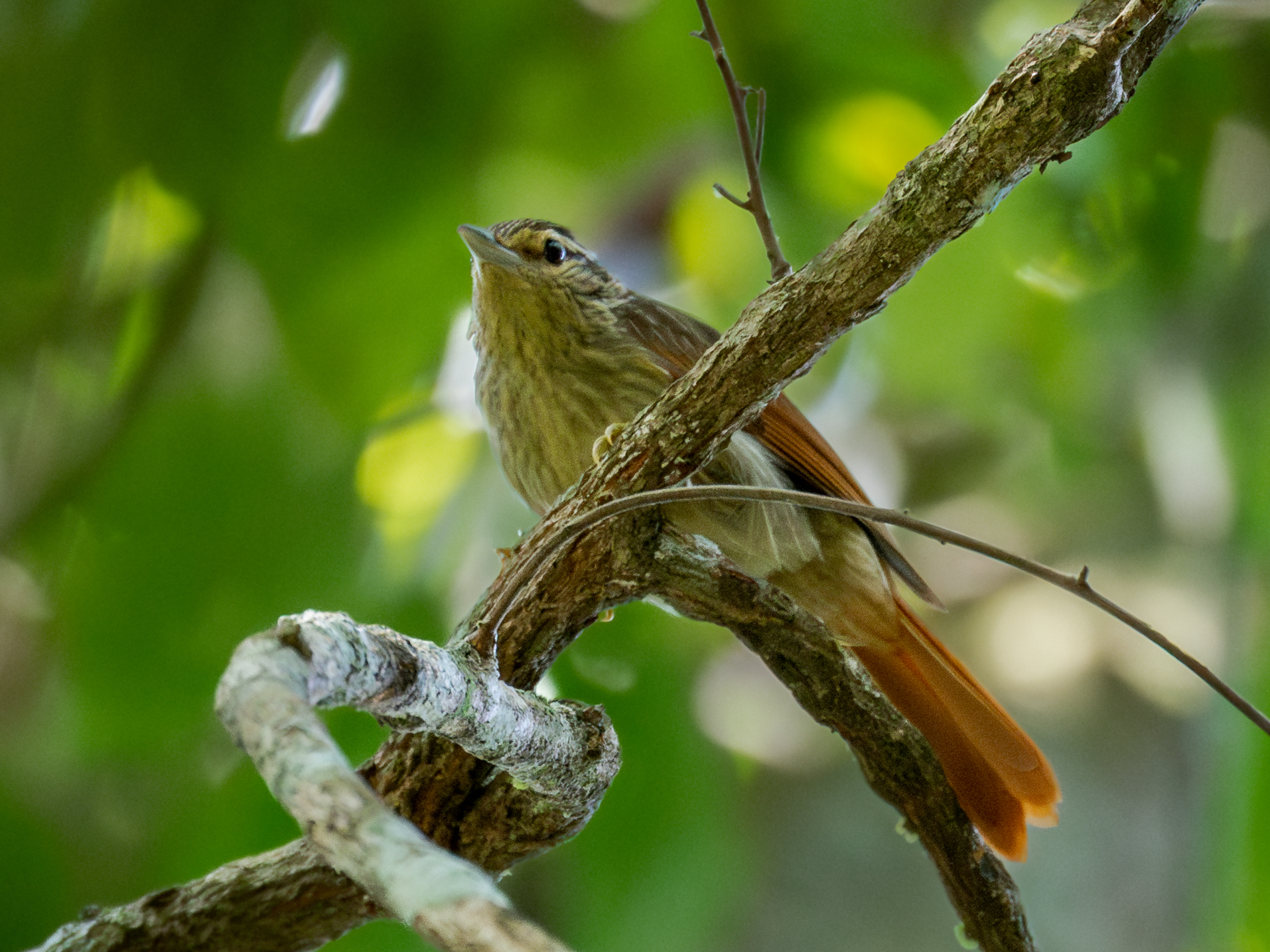

Conservation status
- Least Concern (IUCN 3.1)

Scientific classification
- Kingdom: Animalia
- Phylum: Chordata
- Class: Aves
- Order: Passeriformes
- Family: Furnariidae
- Genus: Ancistrops; P.L. Sclater, 1862
- Species: A. strigilatus

Binomial name
- Ancistrops strigilatus (Spix, 1825)

= Chestnut-winged hookbill =

Species of bird

The chestnut-winged hookbill (Ancistrops strigilatus) is a species of bird in the Furnariinae subfamily of the ovenbird family Furnariidae. It is found in Bolivia, Brazil, Colombia, Ecuador, and Peru.

== Taxonomy and systematics ==
The chestnut-winged hookbill is the only member of its genus. Beyond that its taxonomy is unsettled. The International Ornithological Committee and BirdLife International's Handbook of the Birds of the World treat it as monotypic. The Clements taxonomy assigns it two subspecies, the nominate A. s. strigilatus (Spix, 1825) and A. s. cognitus (Griscom & Greenway Jr, 1937).

Within the ovenbird family, the chestnut-winged hookbill is most closely related to the foliage-gleaners of genus Dendroma.

This article follows the monotypic model.

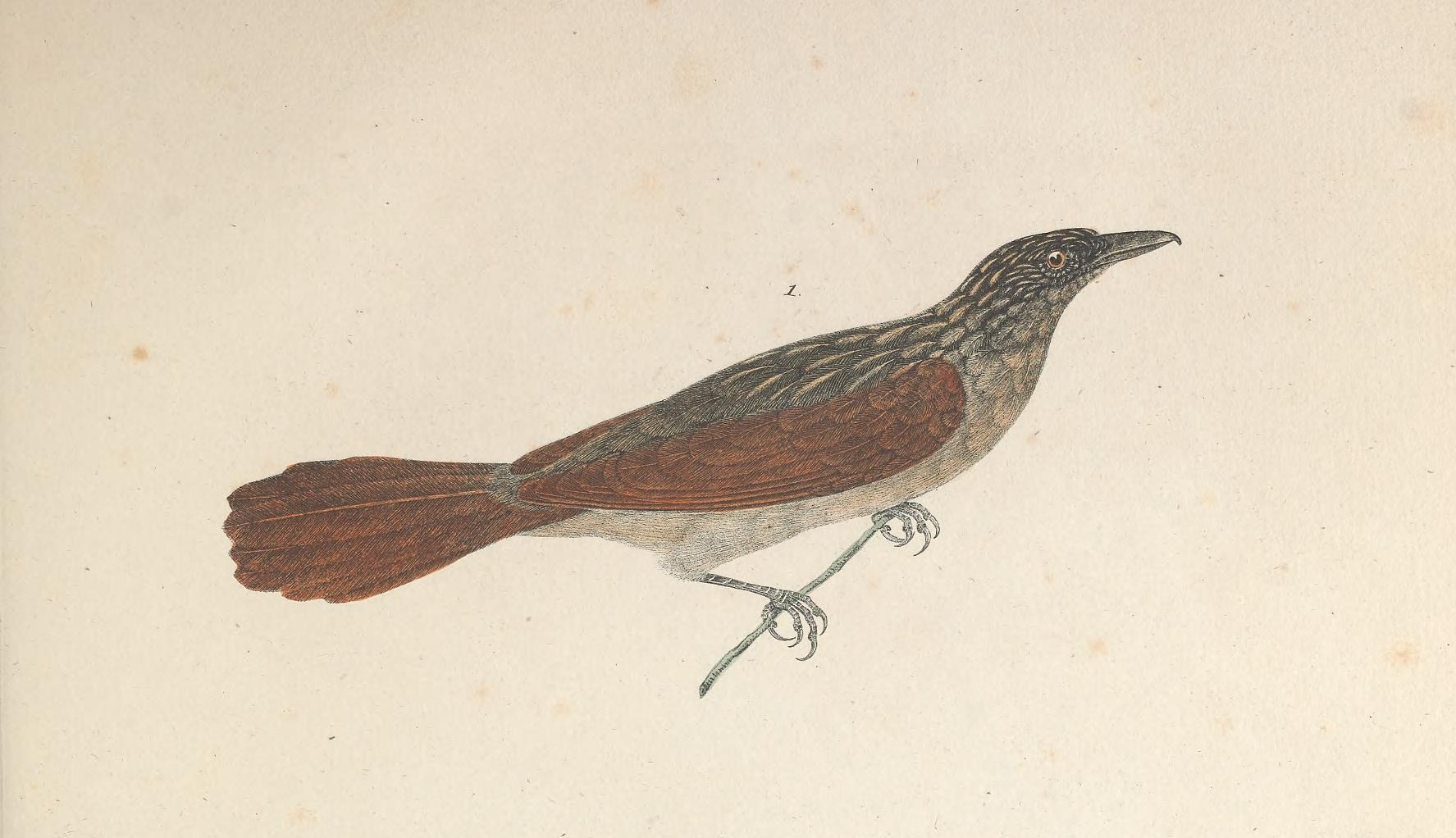
Illustration in Avium Species Novae by von Spix

== Description ==
The chestnut-winged hookbill is 17 to 19 cm (6.7 to 7.5 in) long and weighs 30 to 39 g (1.1 to 1.4 oz). It is a largish furnariid with distinctive plumage, and a moderately hooked bill resembling those of Thamnophilus antshrikes. The sexes have the same plumage. Adults have a wide whitish to buff supercilium, grizzled brownish and buff lores, brown ear coverts with pale streaks, and yellowish buff malars. Their crown is very dark brown with obvious narrow gold-buff streaks. Their back is a paler, somewhat grayish olive, brown, with paler and less well defined streaks. Their rump and uppertail coverts are an even lighter brown with fainter streaks. Their wing coverts are dull chestnut with pale shafts; the flight feathers have dull chestnut outer webs and dark fuscous inner webs and tips. Their tail is bright rufous. Their throat is pale yellowish buff with faint dull brownish flecks, their breast dull yellowish buff with blurry browish streaks, their belly like the breast but only faintly streaked, their flanks dull brownish with yellowish buff streaks, and their undertail coverts mottled dull buff and light browish. Their iris is brown, their maxilla blackish to dark horn, their mandible blue-gray to bluish ivory, and their legs and feet yellowish brown to pale brownish olive. Juveniles have less regular streaks on their upperparts and darker and narrower streaks on their underparts than adults.

== Distribution and habitat ==
The chestnut-winged hookbill is found in the Amazon Basin from southeastern Colombia south through eastern Ecuador and eastern Peru into northern Bolivia and east in Brazil to the Rio Tapajós. In Brazil it mostly occurs south of the Amazon but has been recorded north of it in Jaú National Park. It inhabits tropical lowland evergreen forest. It strongly favors terra firme forest but does occur locally in várzea. In elevation it mostly occurs below 500 m (1,600 ft) but can be found locally up to 900 m (3,000 ft).

== Behavior ==
=== Movement ===
The chestnut-winged hookbill is a year-round resident throughout its range.

=== Feeding ===
The chestnut-winged hookbill feeds on arthropods. It typically forages singly or in pairs, and usually in mixed-species feeding flocks. It mostly forages between the forest's mid-storey and its canopy while moving slowly along branches and in vine tangles. It finds its prey by gleaning, often from dead leaves.

=== Breeding ===
Nothing is known about the chestnut-winged hookbill's breeding biology.

=== Vocalization ===
The chestnut-winged hookbill's song is "a fast, ascending trill that increases in loudness as it levels off in pitch, then ends abruptly" and can last for 30 seconds or more. It has also been described as a "sustained gently undulating, slightly angry-sounding rattle". Its calls include "a harsh, buzzing 'bzzt' " and "teejuw". It also makes a short ascending trill.

== Status ==
The IUCN has assessed the chestnut-winged hookbill as being of Least Concern. It has a vary large range, and though its population size is not known it is believed to be stable. No immediate threats have been identified. It is considered uncommon to locally common and is found in several protected areas.
