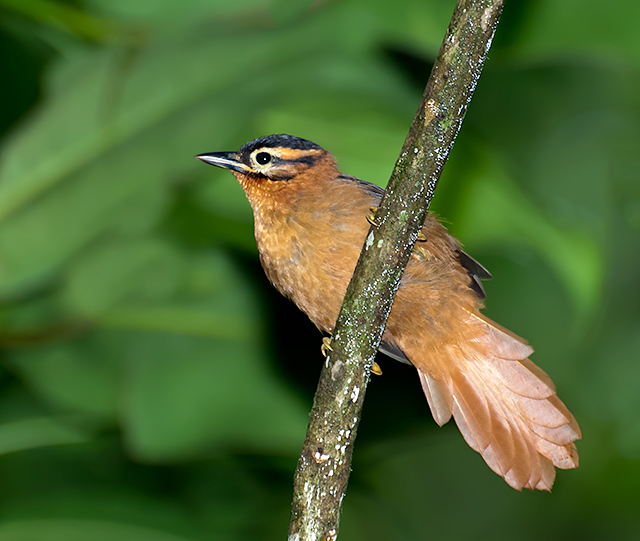
- Black-capped foliage-gleaner

Scientific classification
- Kingdom: Animalia
- Phylum: Chordata
- Class: Aves
- Order: Passeriformes
- Family: Furnariidae
- Genus: Philydor; Spix, 1824

Type species
- Anabates atricapillus zu Wied-Neuwied, 1821

= Philydor =

Genus of birds

Philydor is a genus of foliage-gleaners, birds in the ovenbird family Furnariidae.

== Taxonomy ==
The genus Philydor was introduced in 1824 by the German naturalist Johann Baptist von Spix. The type species was subsequently designated as Anabates atricapillus Wied. The genus name is from Ancient Greek φιλυδρος/philudros meaning "water-loving".

The genus contains three species:

- Cinnamon-rumped foliage-gleaner, Philydor pyrrhodes
- Black-capped foliage-gleaner, Philydor atricapillus
- † Alagoas foliage-gleaner, Philydor novaesi (extinct)
