= List of nightjars =

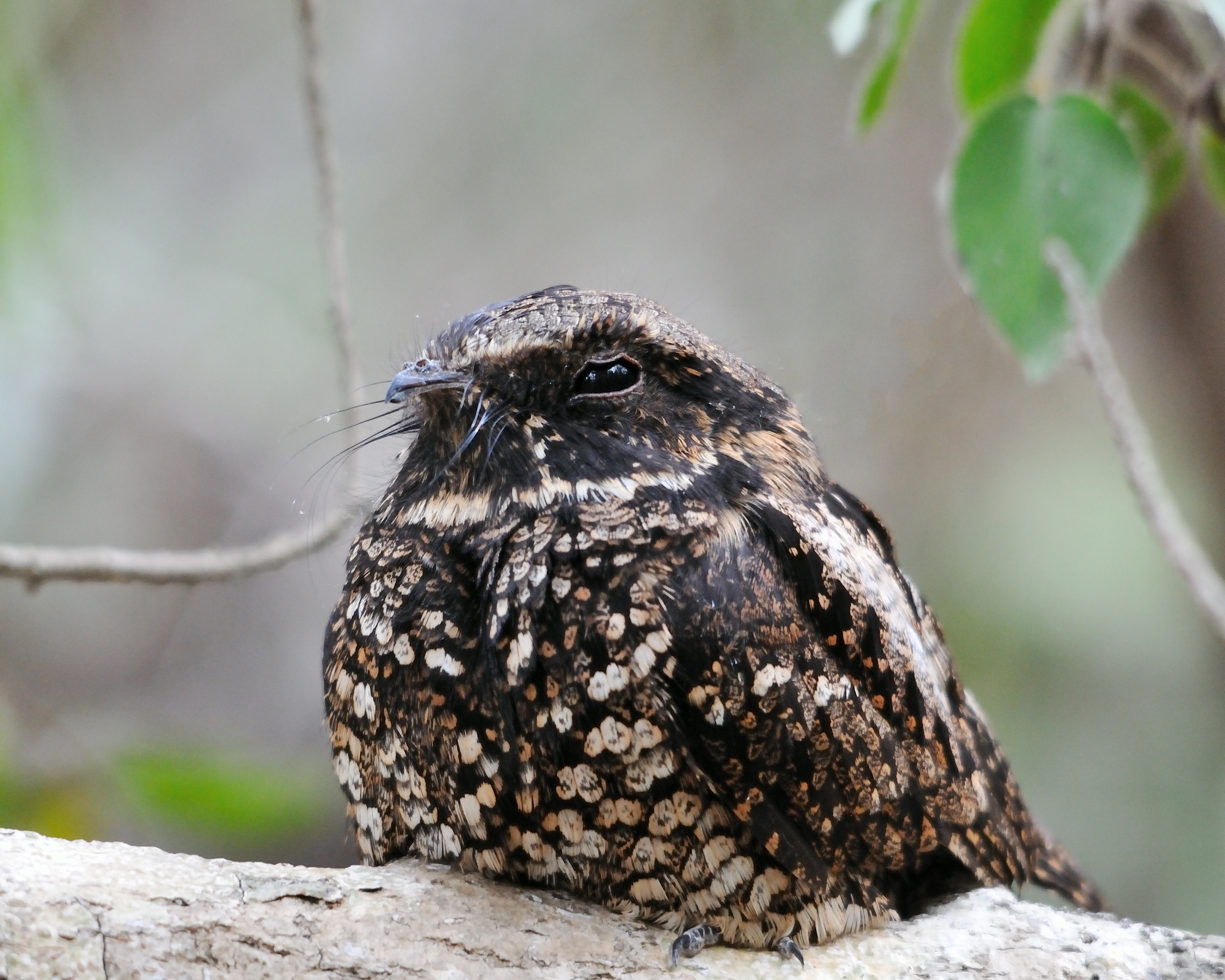
A Puerto Rican nightjar

The International Ornithological Committee (IOC) recognizes these 98 species of nightjars and allies in the family Caprimulgidae. The species are distributed among 20 genera, a few of which have only one member. One extinct species, the Jamaican poorwill, is included.

This list is presented according to the IOC taxonomic sequence and can also be sorted alphabetically by common name and binomial.

Common name	Binomial name + authority	IOC sequence
Spotted nightjar	Eurostopodus argus Hartert, EJO, 1892	1
White-throated nightjar	Eurostopodus mystacalis (Temminck, 1826)	2
Solomons nightjar	Eurostopodus nigripennis Ramsay, EP, 1882	3
New Caledonian nightjar	Eurostopodus exul Mayr, 1941	4
Satanic nightjar	Eurostopodus diabolicus Stresemann, 1931	5
Papuan nightjar	Eurostopodus papuensis (Schlegel, 1866)	6
Archbold's nightjar	Eurostopodus archboldi (Mayr & Rand, 1935)	7
Malaysian eared nightjar	Lyncornis temminckii Gould, 1838	8
Great eared nightjar	Lyncornis macrotis (Vigors, 1831)	9
Collared nightjar	Gactornis enarratus (Gray, GR, 1871)	10
Nacunda nighthawk	Chordeiles nacunda (Vieillot, 1817)	11
Least nighthawk	Chordeiles pusillus Gould, 1861	12
Sand-colored nighthawk	Chordeiles rupestris (Spix, 1825)	13
Lesser nighthawk	Chordeiles acutipennis (Hermann, 1783)	14
Common nighthawk	Chordeiles minor (Forster, JR, 1771)	15
Antillean nighthawk	Chordeiles gundlachii Lawrence, 1857	16
Short-tailed nighthawk	Lurocalis semitorquatus (Gmelin, JF, 1789)	17
Rufous-bellied nighthawk	Lurocalis rufiventris Taczanowski, 1884	18
Band-tailed nighthawk	Nyctiprogne leucopyga (Spix, 1825)	19
Plain-tailed nighthawk	Nyctiprogne vielliardi (Lencioni-Neto, 1994)	20
Blackish nightjar	Nyctipolus nigrescens (Cabanis, 1849)	21
Pygmy nightjar	Nyctipolus hirundinaceus (Spix, 1825)	22
Pauraque	Nyctidromus albicollis (Gmelin, JF, 1789)	23
Anthony's nightjar	Nyctidromus anthonyi (Chapman, 1923)	24
Todd's nightjar	Setopagis heterura Todd, 1915	25
Little nightjar	Setopagis parvula (Gould, 1837)	26
Roraiman nightjar	Setopagis whitelyi (Salvin, 1885)	27
Cayenne nightjar	Setopagis maculosa (Todd, 1920)	28
Sickle-winged nightjar	Eleothreptus anomalus (Gould, 1838)	29
White-winged nightjar	Eleothreptus candicans (Pelzeln, 1867)	30
Band-winged nightjar	Systellura longirostris (Bonaparte, 1825)	31
Tschudi's nightjar	Systellura decussata (Tschudi, 1844)	32
Swallow-tailed nightjar	Uropsalis segmentata (Cassin, 1849)	33
Lyre-tailed nightjar	Uropsalis lyra (Bonaparte, 1850)	34
White-tailed nightjar	Hydropsalis cayennensis (Gmelin, JF, 1789)	35
Spot-tailed nightjar	Hydropsalis maculicaudus (Lawrence, 1862)	36
Ladder-tailed nightjar	Hydropsalis climacocerca (Tschudi, 1844)	37
Scissor-tailed nightjar	Hydropsalis torquata (Gmelin, JF, 1789)	38
Long-trained nightjar	Macropsalis forcipata (Nitzsch, 1840)	39
Least poorwill	Siphonorhis brewsteri (Chapman, 1917)	40
Jamaican poorwill	Siphonorhis americana (Linnaeus, 1758)	41
Choco poorwill	Nyctiphrynus rosenbergi (Hartert, EJO, 1895)	42
Eared poorwill	Nyctiphrynus mcleodii (Brewster, 1888)	43
Yucatan poorwill	Nyctiphrynus yucatanicus (Hartert, EJO, 1892)	44
Ocellated poorwill	Nyctiphrynus ocellatus (Tschudi, 1844)	45
Common poorwill	Phalaenoptilus nuttallii (Audubon, 1844)	46
Chuck-will's-widow	Antrostomus carolinensis (Gmelin, JF, 1789)	47
Rufous nightjar	Antrostomus rufus (Boddaert, 1783)	48
Cuban nightjar	Antrostomus cubanensis Lawrence, 1860	49
Hispaniolan nightjar	Antrostomus ekmani Lönnberg, 1929	50
Tawny-collared nightjar	Antrostomus salvini (Hartert, EJO, 1892)	51
Yucatan nightjar	Antrostomus badius Bangs & Peck, 1908	52
Silky-tailed nightjar	Antrostomus sericocaudatus Cassin, 1849	53
Buff-collared nightjar	Antrostomus ridgwayi Nelson, 1897	54
Eastern whip-poor-will	Antrostomus vociferus (Wilson, A, 1812)	55
Mexican whip-poor-will	Antrostomus arizonae Brewster, 1881	56
Puerto Rican nightjar	Antrostomus noctitherus (Wetmore, 1919)	57
Dusky nightjar	Antrostomus saturatus Salvin, 1870	58
Brown nightjar	Veles binotatus (Bonaparte, 1850)	59
Red-necked nightjar	Caprimulgus ruficollis Temminck, 1820	60
Jungle nightjar	Caprimulgus indicus Latham, 1790	61
Grey nightjar	Caprimulgus jotaka Temminck & Schlegel, 1845	62
Palau nightjar	Caprimulgus phalaena Hartlaub & Finsch, 1872	63
European nightjar	Caprimulgus europaeus Linnaeus, 1758	64
Sombre nightjar	Caprimulgus fraenatus Salvadori, 1884	65
Rufous-cheeked nightjar	Caprimulgus rufigena Smith, A, 1845	66
Egyptian nightjar	Caprimulgus aegyptius Lichtenstein, MHC, 1823	67
Sykes's nightjar	Caprimulgus mahrattensis Sykes, 1832	68
Nubian nightjar	Caprimulgus nubicus Lichtenstein, MHC, 1823	69
Golden nightjar	Caprimulgus eximius Temminck, 1826	70
Jerdon's nightjar	Caprimulgus atripennis Jerdon, 1845	71
Large-tailed nightjar	Caprimulgus macrurus Horsfield, 1821	72
Mees's nightjar	Caprimulgus meesi Sangster & Rozendaal, 2004	73
Timor nightjar	Caprimulgus ritae King, BF, Sangster, Trainor, Irestedt, Prawiradilaga & Ericson, 2024	74
Andaman nightjar	Caprimulgus andamanicus Hume, 1873	75
Philippine nightjar	Caprimulgus manillensis Walden, 1875	76
Sulawesi nightjar	Caprimulgus celebensis Ogilvie-Grant, 1894	77
Donaldson Smith's nightjar	Caprimulgus donaldsoni Sharpe, 1895	78
Fiery-necked nightjar	Caprimulgus pectoralis Cuvier, 1816	79
Montane nightjar	Caprimulgus poliocephalus Rüppell, 1840	80
Indian nightjar	Caprimulgus asiaticus Latham, 1790	81
Madagascar nightjar	Caprimulgus madagascariensis Sganzin, 1840	82
Swamp nightjar	Caprimulgus natalensis Smith, A, 1845	83
Nechisar nightjar	Caprimulgus solala Safford, Ash, Duckworth, Telfer & Zewdie, 1995	84
Plain nightjar	Caprimulgus inornatus Heuglin, 1869	85
Star-spotted nightjar	Caprimulgus stellatus Blundell & Lovat, 1899	86
Savanna nightjar	Caprimulgus affinis Horsfield, 1821	87
Chirruping nightjar	Caprimulgus griseatus Walden, 1875	88
Freckled nightjar	Caprimulgus tristigma Rüppell, 1840	89
Bonaparte's nightjar	Caprimulgus concretus Bonaparte, 1850	90
Salvadori's nightjar	Caprimulgus pulchellus Salvadori, 1879	91
Prigogine's nightjar	Caprimulgus prigoginei Louette, 1990	92
Bates's nightjar	Caprimulgus batesi Sharpe, 1906	93
Long-tailed nightjar	Caprimulgus climacurus Vieillot, 1824	94
Slender-tailed nightjar	Caprimulgus clarus Reichenow, 1892	95
Square-tailed nightjar	Caprimulgus fossii Hartlaub, 1857	96
Standard-winged nightjar	Caprimulgus longipennis Shaw, 1796	97
Pennant-winged nightjar	Caprimulgus vexillarius (Gould, 1838)	98
