= Cayenne nightjar =

Conservation status
- Data Deficient (IUCN 3.1)

Scientific classification
- Kingdom: Animalia
- Phylum: Chordata
- Class: Aves
- Order: Caprimulgiformes
- Family: Caprimulgidae
- Genus: Setopagis
- Species: S. maculosa

Binomial name
- Setopagis maculosa (Todd, 1920)

Synonyms
- Nyctipolus maculosus; Caprimulgus maculosus

Species of bird

The Cayenne nightjar (Setopagis maculosa) is a species of bird in the nightjar family only known from a single specimen, a male taken on the Fleuve Mana, French Guiana, in 1917. However, a possible female was caught at the Saül airstrip, French Guiana, in 1982.

== Taxonomy and systematics ==
The Cayenne nightjar was originally described in 1920 as Nyctipolus maculosus and was later lumped into genus Caprimulgus. Some authors contended that it is not a species, but a subspecies of blackish nightjar (Nyctipolus nigrescens). By the early 2000s it was generally recognized as a species and has been placed in its current genus Setopagis since the early 2010s. Nevertheless, the South American Classification Committee of the American Ornithological Society (AOS) states, " Its placement in Setopagis is entirely tentative", and the Cornell Lab of Ornithology's Birds of the World agrees.

== Description ==
The Cayenne nightjar is known in certainty only from the holotype, a male. The specimen was measured by two researchers as 22 and 22.5 cm (8.7 and 8.9 in) long. The upperparts are grayish-brown with cinnamon spots and broad blackish brown streaks. The face is mostly chestnut. The hindneck has a narrow, indistinct tawny collar with brown bars. The wing coverts are grayish brown, heavily spotted with buff and cinnamon; the scapulars are blackish brown, broadly edged with buff. The tail is brown with a few small white spots and is otherwise mottled with grayish brown and barred with blackish brown. The chin, throat, and upper breast are buff with a chestnut tinge and brown bars. The belly and flanks are buff with brown bars. The individual captured in 1982 differed in minor ways and could have been either a female or an immature male. It was not photographed so there is no permanent record of its appearance.

== Distribution and habitat ==
The only positively identified Cayenne nightjar was collected at Tamanoir, French Guiana, in 1917. The 1982 putative female was captured approximately 180 km (110 mi) southeast of that site, and additional possible sight records came from that general area in 1999. All of the records of Cayenne nightjar (positive and possible) are from humid lowland forest. Blackish nightjar specimens have been collected at the same site as the 1917 holotype; it is strongly associated with rock outcroppings but it is unknown if the Cayenne nightjar shares that habitat preference.

== Biology ==
Nothing is known about the Cayenne nightjar's biology. Its feeding, breeding, and other behaviors are assumed to be similar to those of other nightjars.

== Status ==
The IUCN has assessed the Cayenne nightjar as Data Deficient. "Nevertheless, potentially suitable habitat remains, and there is no reason why the species may not still be extant."
