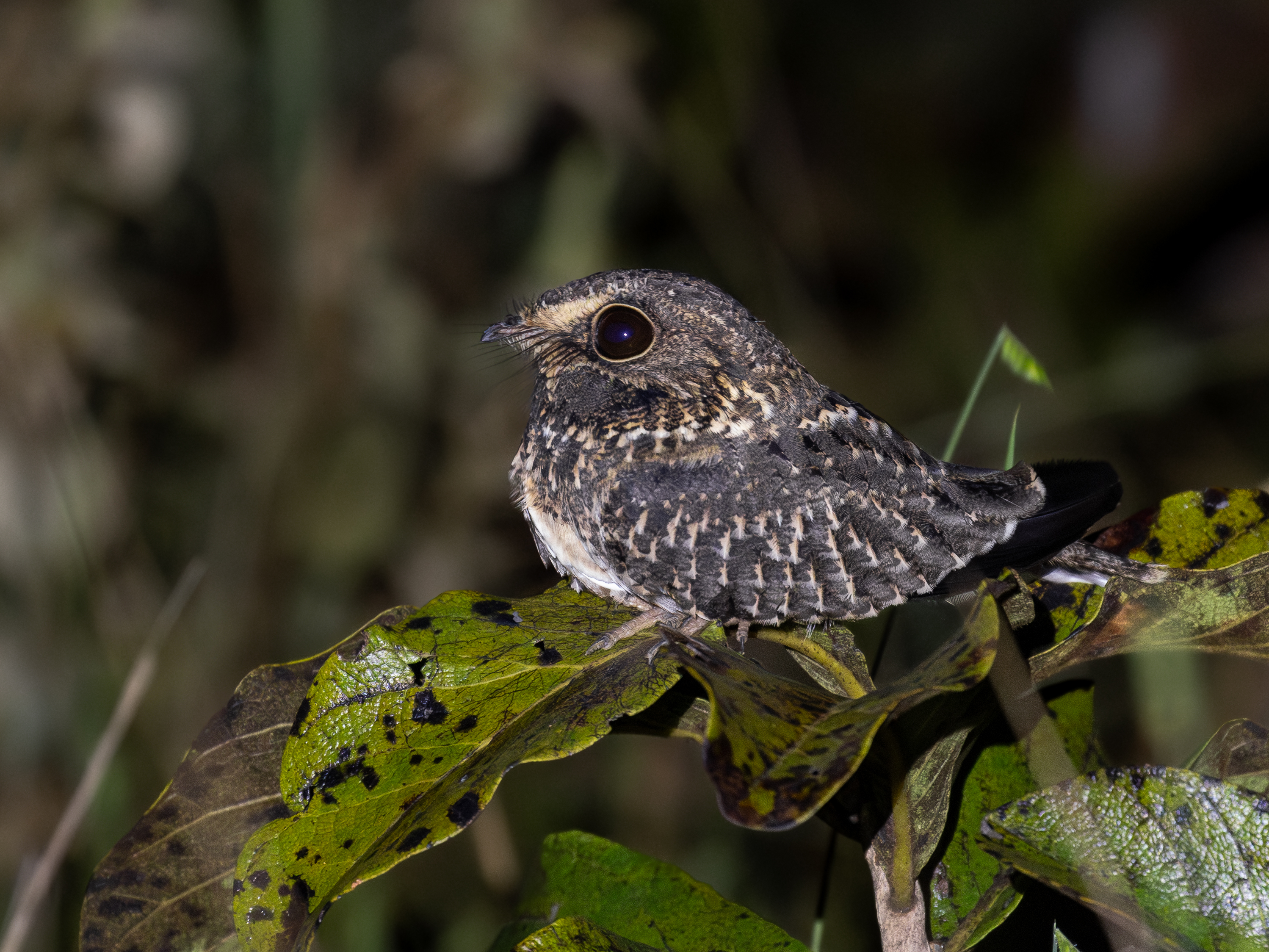

Conservation status
- Vulnerable (IUCN 3.1)

Scientific classification
- Kingdom: Animalia
- Phylum: Chordata
- Class: Aves
- Order: Caprimulgiformes
- Family: Caprimulgidae
- Genus: Eleothreptus
- Species: E. anomalus

Binomial name
- Eleothreptus anomalus (Gould, 1838)

Synonyms
- Amblypterus anomalus; Hydropsalis anomala; Caprimulgus anomalus

= Sickle-winged nightjar =

Species of bird

The sickle-winged nightjar (Eleothreptus anomalus) is a species of nightjar in the family Caprimulgidae. It is found in Argentina, Brazil, Paraguay and possibly Uruguay.

== Taxonomy and systematics ==
The sickle-winged nightjar was described as Amblypterus anomalus which was later lumped into genus Caprimulgus. Since the early 2010s it has been placed in its current genus Eleothreptus, which it shares with the white-winged nightjar (E. candicans). It is monotypic.

== Description ==
The sickle-winged nightjar is 18 to 20 cm (7.1 to 7.9 in) long; one male weighed 43.7 g (1.5 oz). The adult male's upperparts are grayish brown spotted with dark shades of brown. The wings have a hooked "sickle" appearance due to the shape of the primary flight feathers. They are generally grayish brown, with blackish brown, cinnamon, and white markings. The chin is buffish white with brown bars; the throat brown with a cinnamon tinge, brown bars, and buffy streaks; the breast brown with buff spots and streaks; and the belly and flanks pale buff with brown bars. The adult female is browner than the male and does not have the modified primaries. The pattern and shades of the spots and bars are somewhat different as well. Juveniles are similar to the female, with a cinnamon tinge to the upperparts.

== Distribution and habitat ==
The sickle-winged nightjar's distribution is not fully understood. It is documented in northeastern Argentina, southern Paraguay, and southern Brazil. It is suspected to also inhabit Uruguay but there are no documented records there, and there are sight records from further north in Brazil than the documented range. It is believed to be resident in most or all of its range but there are suggestions that it migrates north from Argentina following the breeding season.

== Behavior ==
=== Feeding ===
The sickle-winged nightjar is crepuscular and nocturnal. It forages by sallying from the ground and possibly during low continuous flight. Between sallies it sits on roads and trails or perches on low branches or wire fence. It flies " with slow, fluttering flaps and glides". Its prey is insects though the details are unknown.

=== Breeding ===
The sickle-winged nightjar's breeding season appears to span from August to November or later, based on the dates of observation of adults in breeding condition, eggs, and young. It is assumed to lay its eggs on the ground without a nest like other nightjars.

=== Vocalization ===
One description of the sickle-winged nightjar's song is "a series of soft chip, tchup, or tchut notes"; another is "some chirping, cricket-like sounds" and a third is "a soft, single tick". A reported flight call is "a harsh, nasal gzee gzee".

== Status ==
The IUCN has assessed the sickle-winged nightjar as being vulnerable. Its fairly small population is rapidly declining due to habitat loss and degradation.
