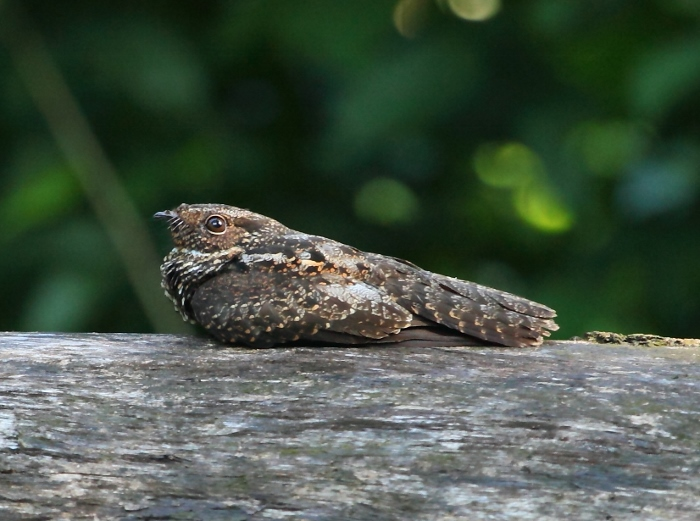
- Blackish nightjar ( Nyctipolus nigrescens)

Scientific classification
- Kingdom: Animalia
- Phylum: Chordata
- Class: Aves
- Order: Caprimulgiformes
- Family: Caprimulgidae
- Genus: Nyctipolus; Ridgway, 1912

Type species
- Caprimulgus nigrescens Cabanis, 1849

= Nyctipolus =

Genus of birds

Nyctipolus is a genus of South American nightjars in the family Caprimulgidae.

== Taxonomy ==
The genus Nyctipolus was introduced in 1912 by the American ornithologist Robert Ridgway with Caprimulgus nigrescens Cabanis, 1849, the blackish nightjar, as the type species. The genus name is derived from the Ancient Greek νυκτιπολος/nuktipolos meaning "roaming by night".

The genus contains the following two species.

Image	Scientific name	Common name	Distribution
	Nyctipolus nigrescens	Blackish nightjar	Brazil, Bolivia, Colombia, Ecuador, French Guiana, Guyana, Peru, Suriname, and Venezuela.
	Nyctipolus hirundinaceus	Pygmy nightjar	Brazil.
