= Todd's nightjar =

Conservation status
- Least Concern (IUCN 3.1)

Scientific classification
- Kingdom: Animalia
- Phylum: Chordata
- Class: Aves
- Order: Caprimulgiformes
- Family: Caprimulgidae
- Genus: Setopagis
- Species: S. heterura

Binomial name
- Setopagis heterura Todd, 1915

Synonyms
- Caprimulgus parvulus heterurus Caprimulgus heterurus Setopagis heterurus

Species of bird

Todd's nightjar (Setopagis heterura) is a species of nightjar in the family Caprimulgidae. It is found in Brazil, Colombia, Guyana, and Venezuela.

== Taxonomy and systematics ==
Todd's nightjar has at times been considered a subspecies of Anthony's nightjar (Nyctidromus anthonyi) and little nightjar (Setopagis parvula) but genetic, plumage, and vocal differences support its treatment as a species. The alternative name, Santa Marta nightjar, after Colombia's Santa Marta Mountains, was rejected because the species' range is much larger. It is monotypic.

== Description ==
Todd's nightjar is 17 to 21 cm (6.7 to 8.3 in) long. The male is generally gray above, with blackish and buff streaks and spots. It has a narrow cinnamon collar on the hindneck, a white throat, and a dark brown breast with fine bars and spots. In flight the wing shows white patches on both top and bottom. All the tail feathers except the innermost ones have conspicuous white tips. The female has a duskier crown, a buffy throat, and no white in the tail. The tail of both sexes is shorter than that of other sympatric nightjars.

== Distribution and habitat ==
Todd's nightjar is mostly found in northeastern Colombia and north and central Venezuela. There are a single record from Guyana and two in far northern Brazil.

Todd's nightjar inhabits a variety of landscapes including the edges of deciduous and semi-deciduous woodland, gallery forest, open woodland, and suburban parks. It appears to favor slightly hilly terrain. In elevation it ranges from sea level to 1,000 m (3,300 ft) in Venezuela but is usually found lower in Colombia.

== Behavior ==
=== Feeding ===
Todd's nightjar forages by sallying from the ground or a low perch. Its diet has not been studied in detail but is known to be mostly if not entirely insects.

=== Breeding ===
The breeding season or seasons of Todd's nightjar has not been defined, though it appears to differ across its range. They lay their two egg clutch directly on the ground, usually under a bush.

=== Vocalization ===
Todd's nightjar's song is "an evenly pitched 'pik-you, gobble-gobble-gobble'", sung from the ground or a low perch. Its other calls, if any, are unknown.

== Status ==
The IUCN has assessed Todd's nightjar as being of Least Concern. It has a fairly large range, and though its population is unknown it is believed to be stable. It appears to be rare in Colombia and uncommon to locally fairly common in Venezuela. It occurs in some protected areas.
