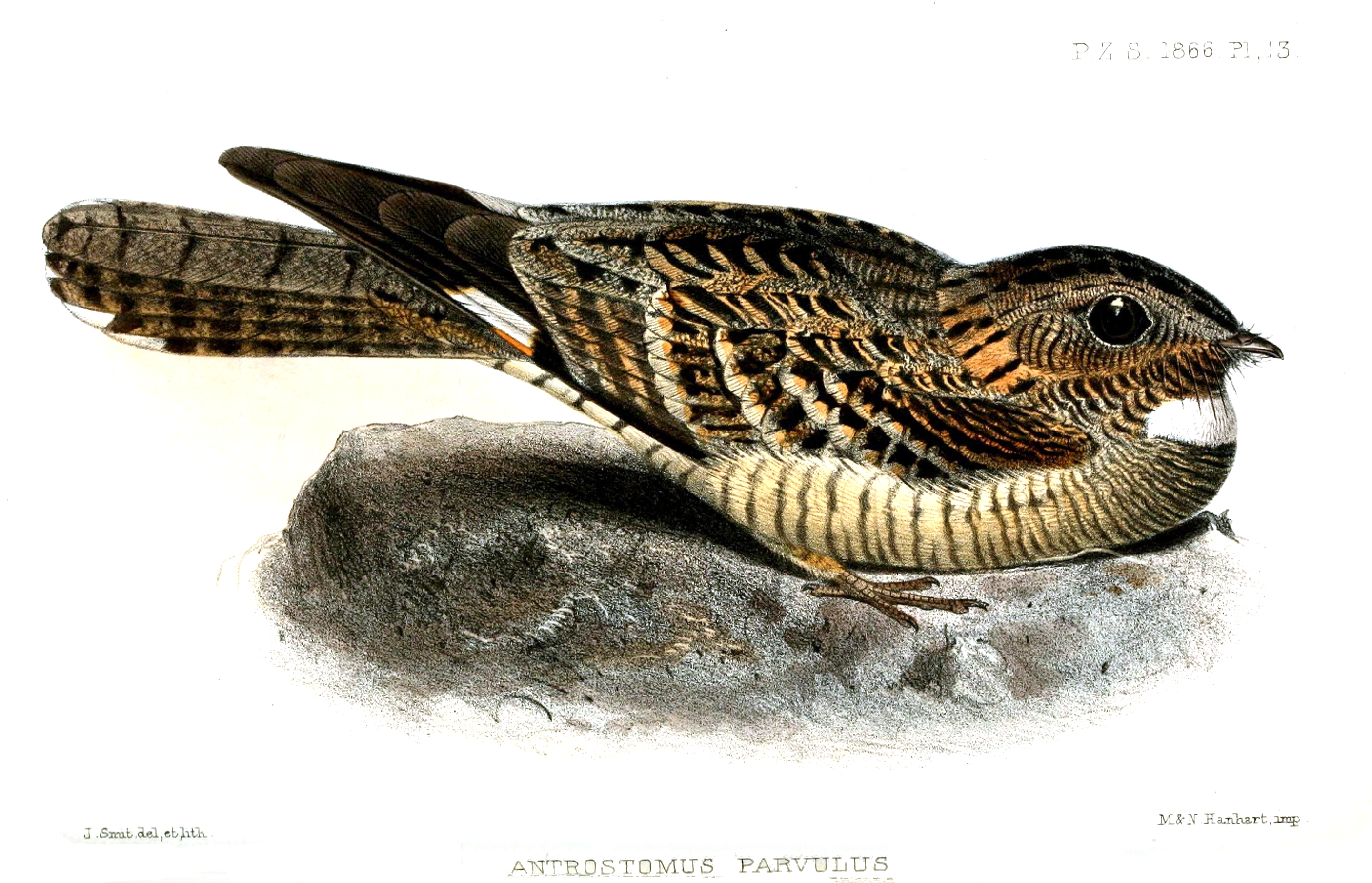
- Little nightjar (Setopagis parvula)

Scientific classification
- Kingdom: Animalia
- Phylum: Chordata
- Class: Aves
- Clade: Strisores
- Order: Caprimulgiformes
- Family: Caprimulgidae
- Genus: Setopagis; Ridgway, 1912

Type species
- Caprimulgus parvulus Gould, 1837

= Setopagis =

Genus of birds

Setopagis is a genus of South American nightjars in the nightjar family Caprimulgidae.

== Taxonomy ==
The genus Setopagis was introduced in 1912 by the American ornithologist Robert Ridgway with Caprimulgus parvulus Gould, 1837, the little nightjar, as the type species. The genus name is derived from Ancient Greek σης/sēs, σητος/sētos meaning "moth" and παγις/pagis meaning "trap".

The genus contains the following four species:

- Todd's nightjar (Setopagis heterura) – formerly treated as a subspecies of Setopagis parvula
- Little nightjar (Setopagis parvula)
- Roraiman nightjar (Setopagis whitelyi)
- Cayenne nightjar (Setopagis maculosa)
