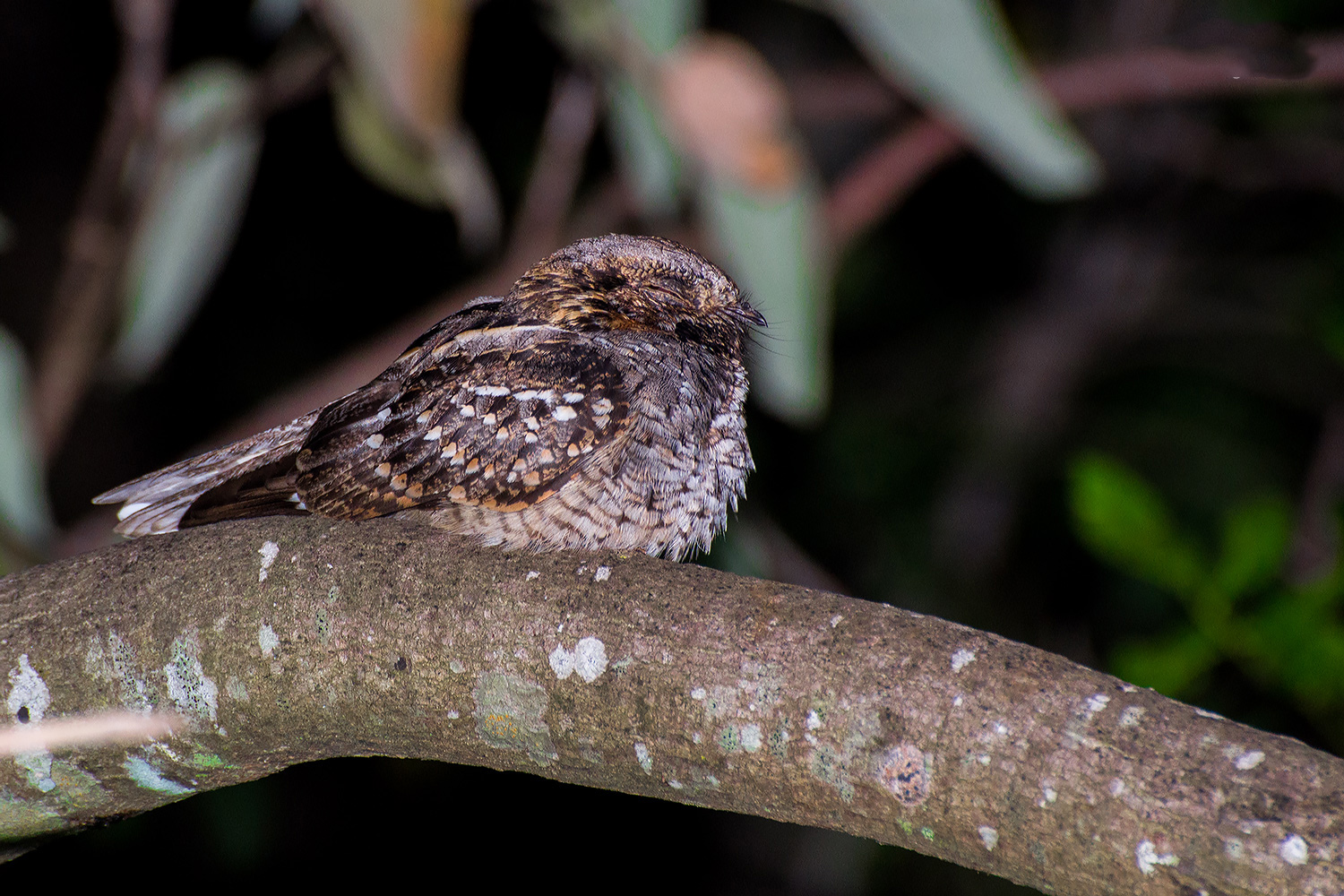

Conservation status
- Least Concern (IUCN 3.1)

Scientific classification
- Kingdom: Animalia
- Phylum: Chordata
- Class: Aves
- Order: Caprimulgiformes
- Family: Caprimulgidae
- Genus: Setopagis
- Species: S. parvula

Binomial name
- Setopagis parvula (Gould, 1837)

Synonyms
- Caprimulgus parvulus Setopagis parvulus Hydropsalis parvula

= Little nightjar =

Species of bird

The little nightjar (Setopagis parvula) is a species of nightjar in the family Caprimulgidae. It is found in Argentina, Bolivia, Brazil, Paraguay, Peru, and Uruguay.

== Taxonomy and systematics ==
The little nightjar was formally described in 1837 by the English ornithologist John Gould under the binomial name Caprimulgus parvulus. Gould did not specify a locality but the specimen had come from near Santa Fe, on the Rio Paraná in northeastern Argentina. The specific epithet parvulus is Latin meaning "very small". The little nightjar is now placed in the genus Setopagis that was introduced in 1912 by the American ornithologist Robert Ridgway. At various times what are now Todd's nightjar (Setopagis heterura) and Anthony's nightjar (Nyctidromus anthonyi) were considered subspecies of little nightjar, but it is now treated as monotypic. Molecular genetic analysis has shown that the little nightjar is sister to Todd's nightjar (Setopagis heterura).

== Description ==
The little nightjar is 19 to 21 cm (7.5 to 8.3 in) long and weighs 25 to 46.5 g (0.88 to 1.6 oz). The male is generally grayish brown with buff, brown, and blackish brown spots and streaks. The belly is buff with brown bars. Its hindneck has a broad but indistinct buff collar, the chin is buffy, and the throat is white. Its wing has a broad white band and the outer tail feathers have white tips. The female is similar but its throat is buff and it does not have white on the wing and tail.

== Distribution and habitat ==
The little nightjar is found from eastern Peru across Bolivia and central and northeastern Brazil to the Atlantic coast, and south through southern Brazil, Paraguay, and Uruguay to central Argentina. One vagrant has been recorded in Aruba. In much of the southern part of its range, and possibly in Peru, it is believed to be migratory, moving north and east during the austral winter. It inhabits brushy savanna and the interior and edges of open woodland and forest. It can also be found in plantations of non-native Eucalyptus. In elevation it ranges from sea level in the east to about 1,500 m (4,900 ft) in Bolivia.

== Behavior ==
=== Feeding ===
The little nightjar is nocturnal. It forages by sallying from the ground or a low perch and possibly during continuous flight like some other nightjars. Its prey is insects; though its diet has not been detailed, members of at least five orders have been identified as part of it.

=== Breeding ===
The little nightjar's breeding season appears to vary across its range; breeding activity has been noted between August and January. The two egg clutch is laid directly on the ground and both sexes incubate.

=== Vocalization ===
The little nightjar's song is "a rattling, clacking, flat, unbirdlike sound in [a] pattern of hurr-ee quick quick quick quick quick quick".

== Status ==
The IUCN has assessed the little nightjar as being of Least Concern. It has a very large range and though its population is unknown it is believed to be stable. No threats have been identified.
