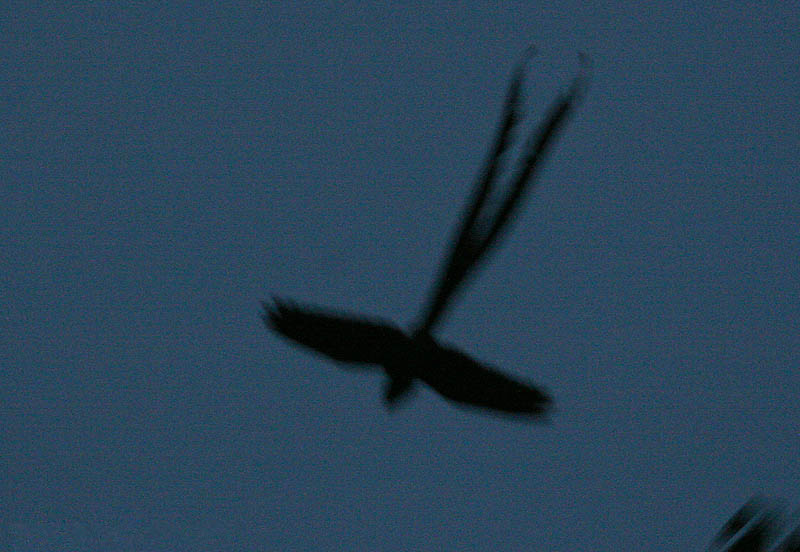
- Male in NW Ecuador

Conservation status
- Least Concern (IUCN 3.1)

Scientific classification
- Domain: Eukaryota
- Kingdom: Animalia
- Phylum: Chordata
- Class: Aves
- Clade: Strisores
- Order: Caprimulgiformes
- Family: Caprimulgidae
- Genus: Uropsalis
- Species: U. lyra

Binomial name
- Uropsalis lyra (Bonaparte, 1850)

Synonyms
- Hydropsalis lyra

= Lyre-tailed nightjar =

Species of bird

The lyre-tailed nightjar (Uropsalis lyra) is a species of nightjar in the family Caprimulgidae. It is found in Argentina, Bolivia, Colombia, Ecuador, Peru, and Venezuela.

== Taxonomy and systematics ==
The lyre-tailed nightjar shares its genus with the swallow-tailed nightjar (Uropsalis segmentata). It has three subspecies, the nominate U. l. lyra, U. l. peruana, and U. l. argentina.

== Description ==
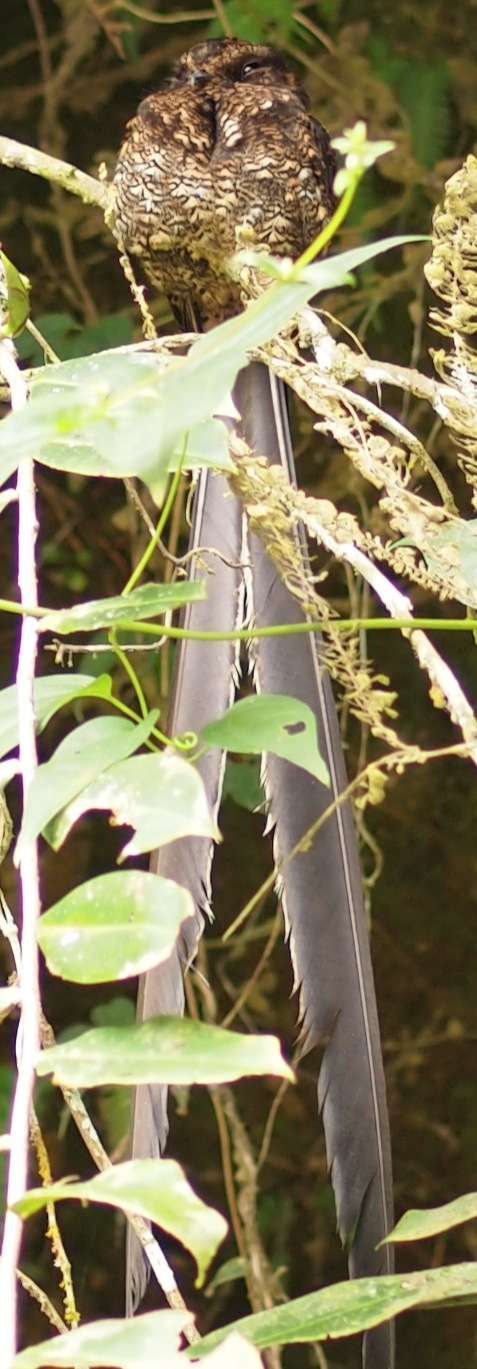
Lyre-tailed nightjar

The male lyre-tailed nightjar has extremely long outer tail feathers from which the species gets its name; they are more than twice as long as its body. The female's tail is much shorter and less graduated. Adults of the nominate subspecies are 23.5 to 28 cm (9.3 to 11 in) long excluding the tail streamers. The tail exceeds 60 cm (24 in) in length. Males weigh about 70 g (2.5 oz) and females about 77 g (2.7 oz). The male's upperparts are brown. Its crown and nape are spotted with grayish white, buff, tawny, and cinnamon; the back also has tawny and cinnamon spots. It has a broad tawny "collar" around the nape. The tail is brown; the streamers have broad grayish white tips and the other tail feathers are barred and mottled with tawny and buff. The wings are also overall brown with buff, tawny, and cinnamon spots and mottling. The chin and throat are tawny or buff with brown bars and spots, and the "collar" extends across the throat. The breast and upper belly are brown with dense tawny bars and spots. the lower belly and flanks are buff barred with brown. The female's crown is grayish rather than brown and the primary wing feathers have more prominent rufous markings than the male's.

U. l. peruana is somewhat larger than the nominate and has a more reddish cast overall. U. l. argentina is the largest of the three subspecies. Compared to the nominate, its breast markings are whiter, and the tail streamers are tipped with gray instead of white.

== Distribution and habitat ==
The nominate subspecies of lyre-tailed nightjar is found in the Andes of western Venezuela, western Colombia, and Ecuador, and possibly northern Peru. U. l. peruana is found on the east slope of the Andes of Peru and into central Bolivia. U. l. argentina is found in the Andes of northern Argentina and possibly southern Bolivia. In elevation the species mostly ranges from 1,100 to 2,100 m (3,600 to 6,900 ft) but occurs as low as 800 m (2,600 ft) and as high as 3,500 m (11,500 ft). It inhabits humid montane forest, especially its edges and openings. It favors cliffs and ravines near running water.

== Behavior ==
=== Feeding ===
The lyre-tailed nightjar is crepuscular and nocturnal. It forages by sallying from a rock or low perch along the forest edge. It may fly some distance but usually returns to the same perch. Though its diet has not been described, it is assumed to be insects like that of other nightjars. During the day it roosts on a branch or cliff, usually at least partly hidden by vegetation.

=== Breeding ===
The lyre-tailed nightjar is thought to be polygynous. Males display in flight to females at communal leks. The breeding season has not been defined though it seems to vary across the species' range. One well studied nest was a scrape cleared of debris in an abandoned masonry fireplace in disturbed forest near pastureland. The female cared for the one nestling and no male was seen nearby.

=== Vocalization ===
The lyre-tailed nightjar's song is a "rollicking...5-11 rising wéeou-tee notes". It is mostly sung at dusk, from a perch or the ground. It is also given in flight or when chasing a female. The male's display flight includes a rapid series of "weep-weep-weep-weepupup" sounds.

== Status ==
The IUCN has assessed the lyre-tailed nightjar as being of Least Concern. Though its population has not been quantified it appear to be stable. No immediate threats have been identified though deforestation may be one in the future.
