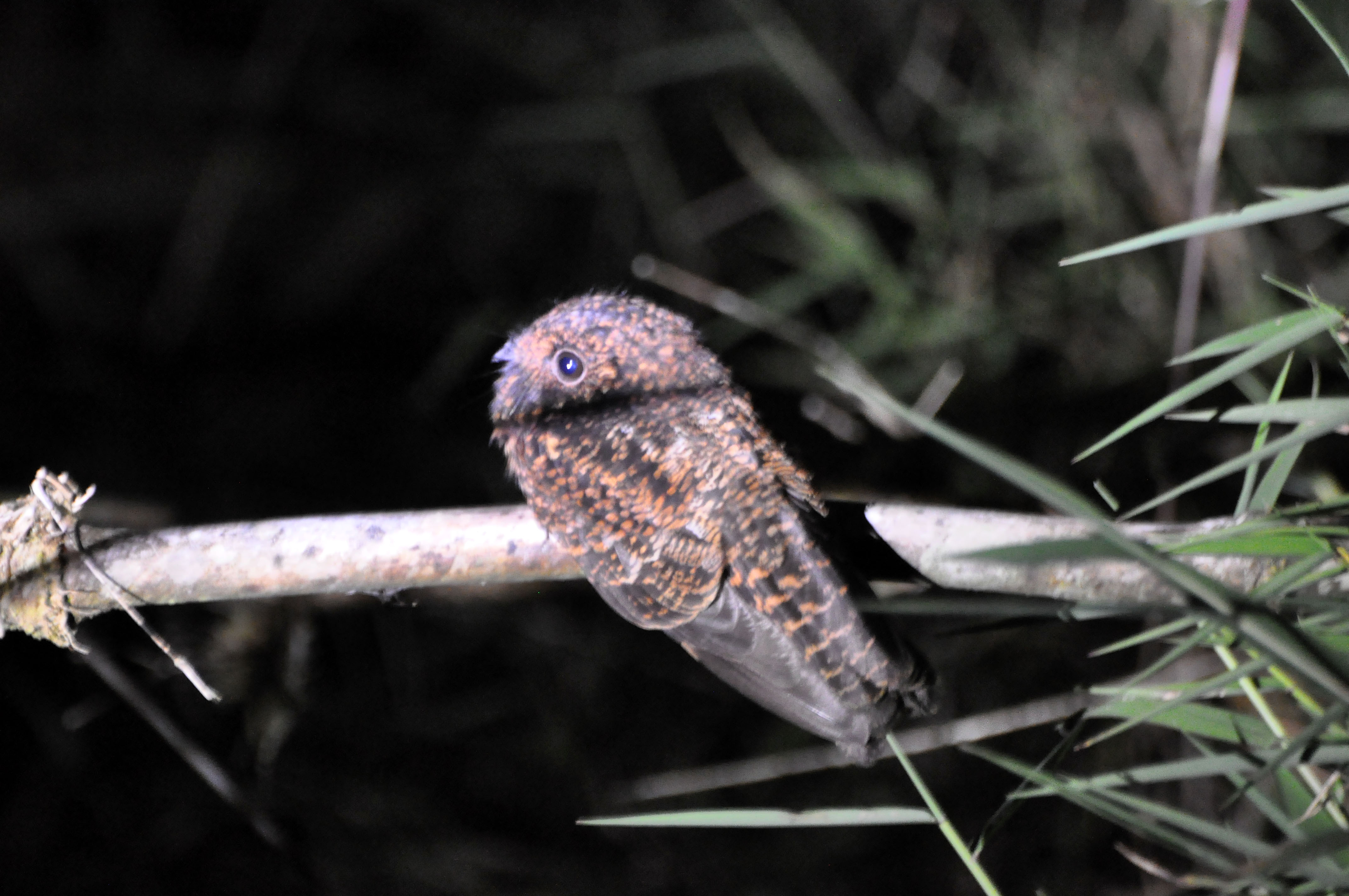

Conservation status
- Least Concern (IUCN 3.1)

Scientific classification
- Kingdom: Animalia
- Phylum: Chordata
- Class: Aves
- Order: Caprimulgiformes
- Family: Caprimulgidae
- Genus: Uropsalis
- Species: U. segmentata

Binomial name
- Uropsalis segmentata (Cassin, 1849)

Audio

= Swallow-tailed nightjar =

Species of bird

The swallow-tailed nightjar (Uropsalis segmentata) is a species of nightjar in the family Caprimulgidae. It is found in Bolivia, Colombia, Ecuador, and Peru.

== Taxonomy and systematics ==
The swallow-tailed nightjar shares its genus with the lyre-tailed nightjar (Uropsalis lyra) and has two subspecies, the nominate U. s. segmentata and U. s. kalinowskii. The nominate was originally described as Hydropsalis segmentata and U. s. kalinowskii as a separate species, Macropsalis kalinowskii.

== Description ==
The male swallow-tailed nightjar has extremely long outer tail feathers from which the species gets its name; the female's tail is much shorter and less graduated. The male is 66 cm (26 in) long including the tail streamers and weighs about 42 g (1.5 oz). The female is 23 cm (9.1 in) long and weighs about 43 g (1.5 oz). The upperparts of both sexes of the nominate subspecies are dark brown with many tawny spots. The tail is generally brown; the outer tail feathers of both sexes have white shafts and outer webs and the others have tawny bars and spots. The wings are brown to grayish brown with tawny spots. The chin and throat are dark brown with buff spots, the breast dark brown with tawny and buff scallops, and the belly and flanks buff with brown bars. U. s. kalinowskii has a somewhat shorter tail, the white on the outer feathers is barred rather than continuous, and the inner tail feathers have a whitish band near the tip.

== Distribution and habitat ==
The swallow-tailed nightjar is a bird of the Andes. The nominate subspecies is found in Colombia and Ecuador and U. s. kalinowskii in Peru and Bolivia. In Colombia it is found in the Central and Eastern Andes, on the main Andes' west slope in northern Ecuador and northwestern Peru, and on the east slope for the entire length of Ecuador, most of Peru, and well into Bolivia. In Colombia it ranges from 2,500 to 3,500 m (8,200 to 11,500 ft) of elevation, in Peru from 2,000 to 3,600 m (6,600 to 11,800 ft), and in Bolivia from 2,000 to 3,400 m (6,600 to 11,200 ft). In Ecuador it is mostly found from 2,500 to 3,200 m (8,200 to 10,500 ft) but also as low as 2,100 m (6,900 ft) in Napo Province. The swallow-tailed nightjar typically inhabits elfin forest but also the edges of humid montane forest and openings with bamboo, grass, or shrubs.

== Behavior ==
=== Feeding ===
The swallow-tailed nightjar is crepuscular and nocturnal. It forages by sallying from the ground or a low perch and also during low continuous flight over open areas. It preys on insects, though details of its diet have not been studied. It roosts on the ground during the day.

=== Breeding ===
The swallow-tailed nightjar's breeding season has not been defined though it appears to include August and September. The one nest that has been described in detail was a depression in the ground lined with dried leaves and dead twigs and cntained one egg. (This contrasts with those of many other nightjars, which lay eggs on bare ground.)

=== Vocalization ===
The swallow-tailed nightjar's song has been described as "unmistakable and beautiful ... a vibrating worr-r-r-e-e-e-e-e-r, at first sliding up, then dropping down", and is sung from the ground. It also makes "a liquid, rising pwip, and a musical mellow stuttered whistle when agitated".

== Conservation status ==
The IUCN has assessed the swallow-tailed nightjar as being of Least Concern. Though its population has not been quantified, it is believed stable. No immediate threats have been identified though deforestation might be in the future.
