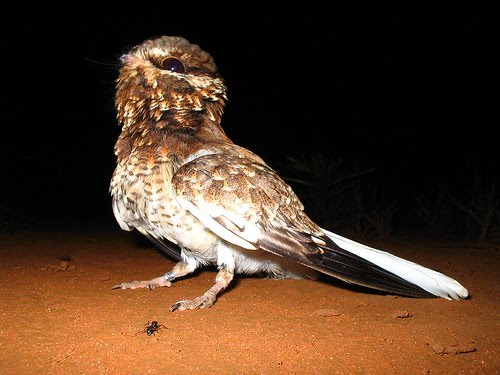
- White-winged nightjar (Eleothreptus candicans)

Scientific classification
- Domain: Eukaryota
- Kingdom: Animalia
- Phylum: Chordata
- Class: Aves
- Clade: Strisores
- Order: Caprimulgiformes
- Family: Caprimulgidae
- Subfamily: Caprimulginae
- Genus: Eleothreptus; Gray, GR, 1840

Type species
- Amblypterus anomalus Gould, 1838

= Eleothreptus =

Genus of birds

Eleothreptus is a genus of South American nightjars in the nightjar family Caprimulgidae.

== Taxonomy ==
The genus Eleothreptus was introduced in 1840 by the English zoologist George Gray with Amblypterus anomalus Gould, 1838, the sickle-winged nightjar, as the type species. Eleothreptus was a replacement name for Amblypterus that had been used by Louis Agassiz in 1833 for a genus of fossil fishes. The genus name is from Ancient Greek ἑλεοθρεπτος/heleothreptos meaning "marsh-bred" from ἑλος/helos, ἑλεος/heleos meaning "marsh" and τρεφω/trephō meaning "to nourish".

The genus contains the following two species:

- Sickle-winged nightjar (Eleothreptus anomalus)
- White-winged nightjar (Eleothreptus candicans)
