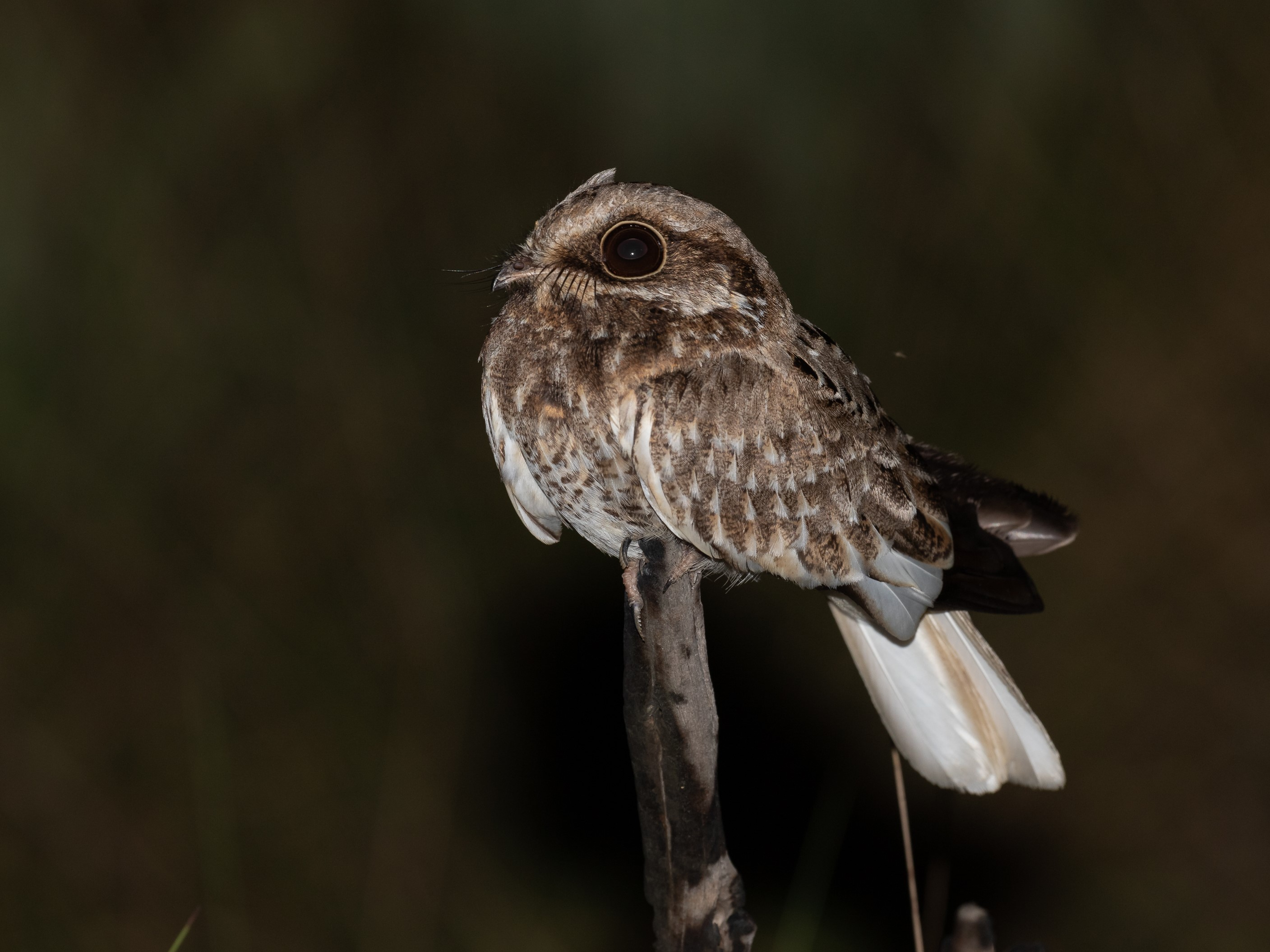

Conservation status
- Vulnerable (IUCN 3.1)

Scientific classification
- Domain: Eukaryota
- Kingdom: Animalia
- Phylum: Chordata
- Class: Aves
- Clade: Strisores
- Order: Caprimulgiformes
- Family: Caprimulgidae
- Genus: Eleothreptus
- Species: E. candicans

Binomial name
- Eleothreptus candicans (Pelzeln, 1867)

= White-winged nightjar =

Species of bird

The white-winged nightjar (Eleothreptus candicans) is a species of nightjar in the family Caprimulgidae. It is found in Bolivia, Brazil and Paraguay.

== Taxonomy and systematics ==
The white-winged nightjar, with two other nightjars, was at one time placed in genus Thermochalcis that was later merged into Caprimulgus. Since the early 2010s it has been placed in its current genus Eleothreptus, which it shares with the sickle-winged nightjar (E. anomalus). It is monotypic.

== Description ==
The white-winged nightjar is 19 to 23 cm (7.5 to 9.1 in) long. Adult males weigh 46 to 55 g (1.6 to 1.9 oz) and females 46 to 55 g (1.6 to 1.9 oz). The adult male's upperparts are pale grayish brown with bold blackish spots on the crown and brown streaks, bars, and speckles on most of the rest. Much of the face is brown, with a white supercilium and "moustache". The breast is grayish brown with a chestnut tinge and brown bars and speckles; the rest of the underparts are white. In flight the male shows whitish wings and a mostly white tail. Adult females have buffy underparts and no white in the plumage. Juveniles are browner rather than grayish.

== Distribution and habitat ==
The white-winged nightjar is known from widely separated sites in northern Bolivia, south-central Brazil, and eastern Paraguay. There are also historical reports from sites in southern Brazil. It inhabits open grassland with scattered trees and bushes such as savanna and cerrado. In elevation it ranges from sea level to 210 m (690 ft).

== Behavior ==
=== Movement ===
The white-winged nightjar might be migratory in at least part of its range.

=== Feeding ===
The white-winged nightjar mostly forages in continuous low flight, though it has also been recorded sallying from low perches. Its flight is "typically slow and frequently interspersed by glides". It feeds on insects including beetles and moths.

=== Breeding ===
The first white-winged nightjar nest was found in 1997. The clutch of two eggs is laid directly on the ground. In Paraguay egg laying was documented from mid September to mid November. Females alone incubate the eggs. Males make a display flight that shows the white of the wings and tail; the display is apparently both territorial and for mate attraction.

=== Vocalization ===
Male white-winged nightjars makes a soft territorial call "tshere-she-shew" during chases. Display flights also include mechanical wing noises. The species' alarm call is an abrupt "eek".

== Status ==
The IUCN originally assessed the white-winged nightjar as Threatened, then in 1994 as Critically Endangered, and in 2000 as Endangered. Since 2019 it has been rated Vulnerable. It has a very small population and is known from only a few scattered sites. The main threats include conversion of habitat to agriculture (pasture, row crops, and Eucalyptus plantations) and fire.
