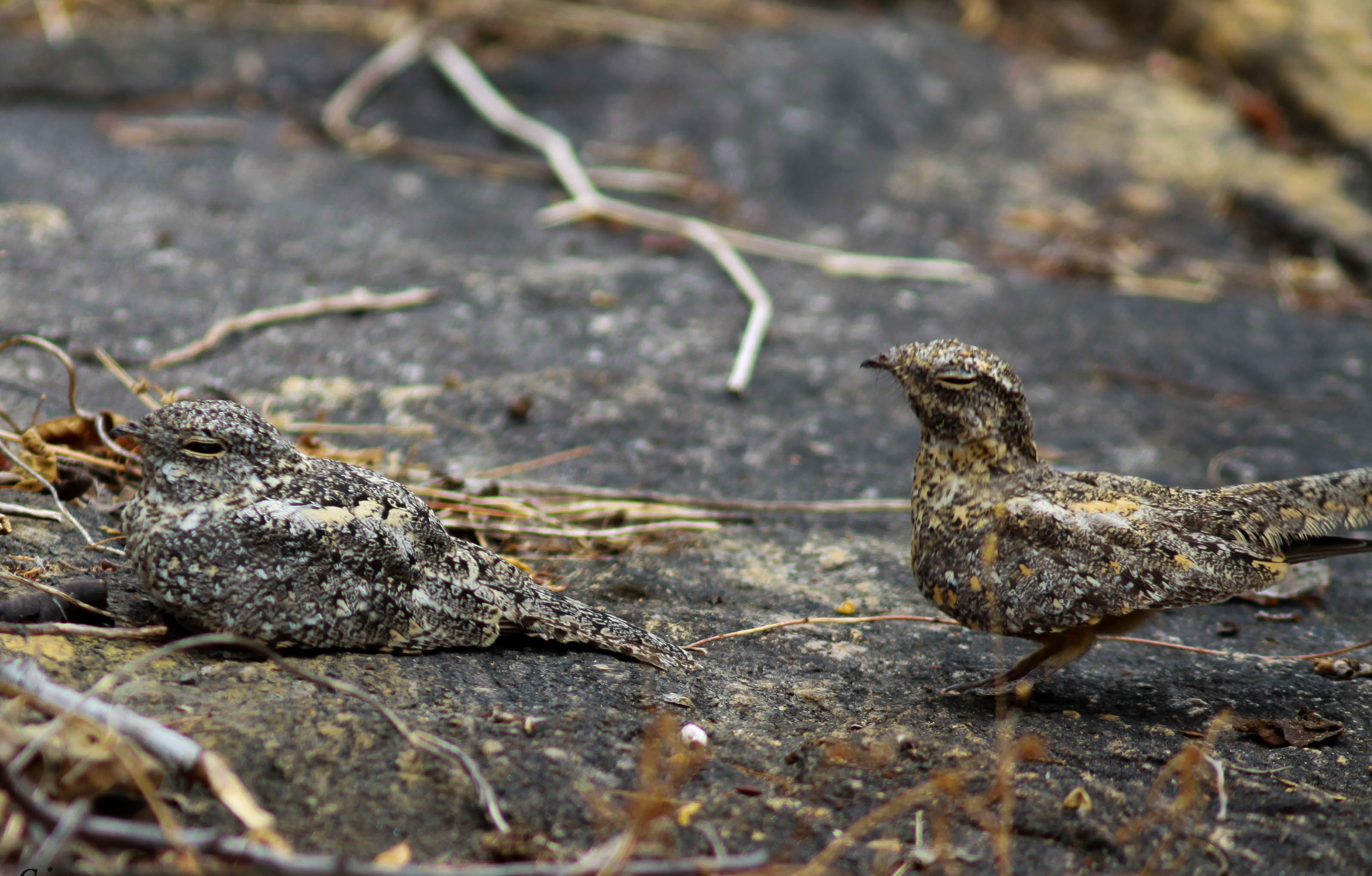

Conservation status
- Least Concern (IUCN 3.1)

Scientific classification
- Kingdom: Animalia
- Phylum: Chordata
- Class: Aves
- Order: Caprimulgiformes
- Family: Caprimulgidae
- Genus: Nyctipolus
- Species: N. hirundinaceus

Binomial name
- Nyctipolus hirundinaceus (Spix, 1825)

Synonyms
- Caprimulgus hirundinaceus

= Pygmy nightjar =

Species of bird

The pygmy nightjar (Nyctipolus hirundinaceus) is a species of nightjar in the family Caprimulgidae. It is endemic to Brazil.

== Taxonomy and systematics ==
The pygmy nightjar was originally placed in genus Caprimulgus, but DNA analyses show that it and its sister species blackish nightjar (Nyctipolus nigrescens) require their own genus. It has three subspecies, the nominate N. n. nigrescens, N. n. cearae, and N. n. veilliardi.

== Description ==
The pygmy nightjar is 16 to 20 cm (6.3 to 7.9 in) long; one male weighed 32 g (1.1 oz). Males of the nominate subspecies have brown upperparts with grayish white and cinnamon speckles. The tail is brown with paler bars; some feathers have white tips. They have a buffy throat stripe and a white chin and throat with brown bars. The upper breast is a broad buffy cinnamon band with brown spots, the lower breast is brown with pale spots and bars, and the belly and flanks buff with brown bars. Females are similar to the males but paler and do not have the white on the tail. N. n. cearae is paler than the nominate, with a more rufous belly and lighter brown bars on the underparts. The tail has more white. N. n. veilliardi is darker than the nominate.

== Distribution and habitat ==
The nominate subspecies of pygmy nightjar is found in the northeastern Brazilian states of Piauí, Bahia, and Alagoas. N. n. cearae is also found in northeastern Brazil, from northern Ceará south into extreme northern Bahia. N. n. veilliardi is found in southeastern Minas Gerais and west central Espírito Santo states of eastern Brazil.

The pygmy nightjar inhabits dry landscapes of scrub and deciduous forest. In the caatinga region it favors gravelly or stony sites. In the Atlantic Forest region it typically is found at stony outcrops.

== Behavior ==
The pygmy nightjar is usually solitary except when paired for breeding. It typically roosts on open ground during the day.

=== Feeding ===
The pygmy nightjar is active from dusk to dawn. It forages in open areas by flying up from the ground to capture prey and returning to the same site. Its diet has not been studied in detail but is known to be insects.

=== Breeding ===
The pygmy nightjar breeds during the rainy season, between November and May. It lays a single egg on bare ground. Females tend the nest during the day and males at night. Both sexes have a distraction display in response to potential threats.

=== Vocalization ===
The pygmy nightjar's song is "a short single-noted, whistle, wheeo or wheo, and is often preceded by a rapid series of 3-4 wha notes, e.g. wha wha wah wheeo." Its alarm call is "liquid prrip notes."

== Status ==
The IUCN has assessed the pygmy nightjar as being of Least Concern. Its population size is unknown and believed to be decreasing. The caatinga habitat especially is affected by increased settlement and agriculture.
