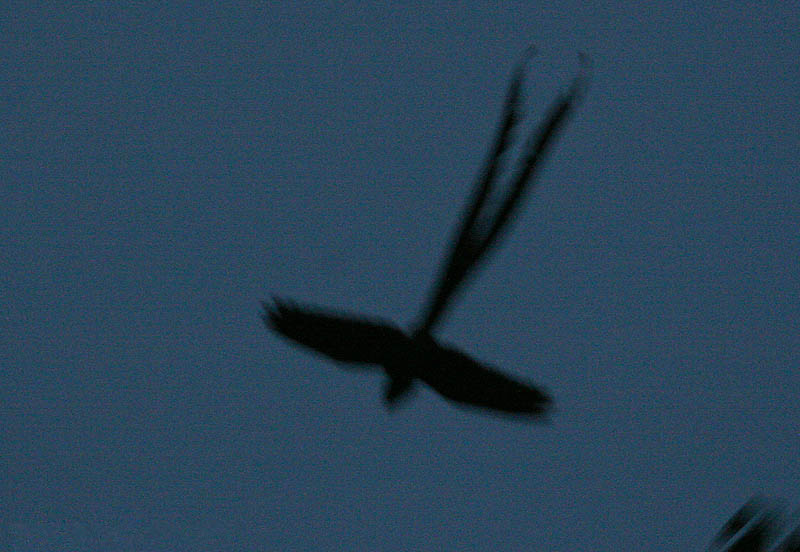
- Lyre-tailed nightjar (Uropsalis lyra)

Scientific classification
- Kingdom: Animalia
- Phylum: Chordata
- Class: Aves
- Clade: Strisores
- Order: Caprimulgiformes
- Family: Caprimulgidae
- Genus: Uropsalis; Miller, W, 1915

Type species
- Hydropsalis lyra Bonaparte, 1850

= Uropsalis =

Genus of nightjar

Uropsalis is a genus of South American nightjars in the nightjar family Caprimulgidae.

== Taxonomy ==
The genus Uropsalis was introduced in 1915 by the American ornithologist Waldron DeWitt Miller with Hydropsalis lyra Bonaparte, 1850, the lyre-tailed nightjar, as the type species. The genus name combines the Ancient Greek ουρα/oura meaning "tail" and ψαλις/psalis, ψαλιδος/psalidos meaning "pair of scissors" or "shears".

The genus contains two species:

| Image | Scientific name | Common name | Distribution |
|---|---|---|---|
| | Uropsalis lyra | Lyre-tailed nightjar | Argentina, Bolivia, Colombia, Ecuador, Peru, and Venezuela. |
| | Uropsalis segmentata | Swallow-tailed nightjar | Bolivia, Colombia, Ecuador, and Peru. |
