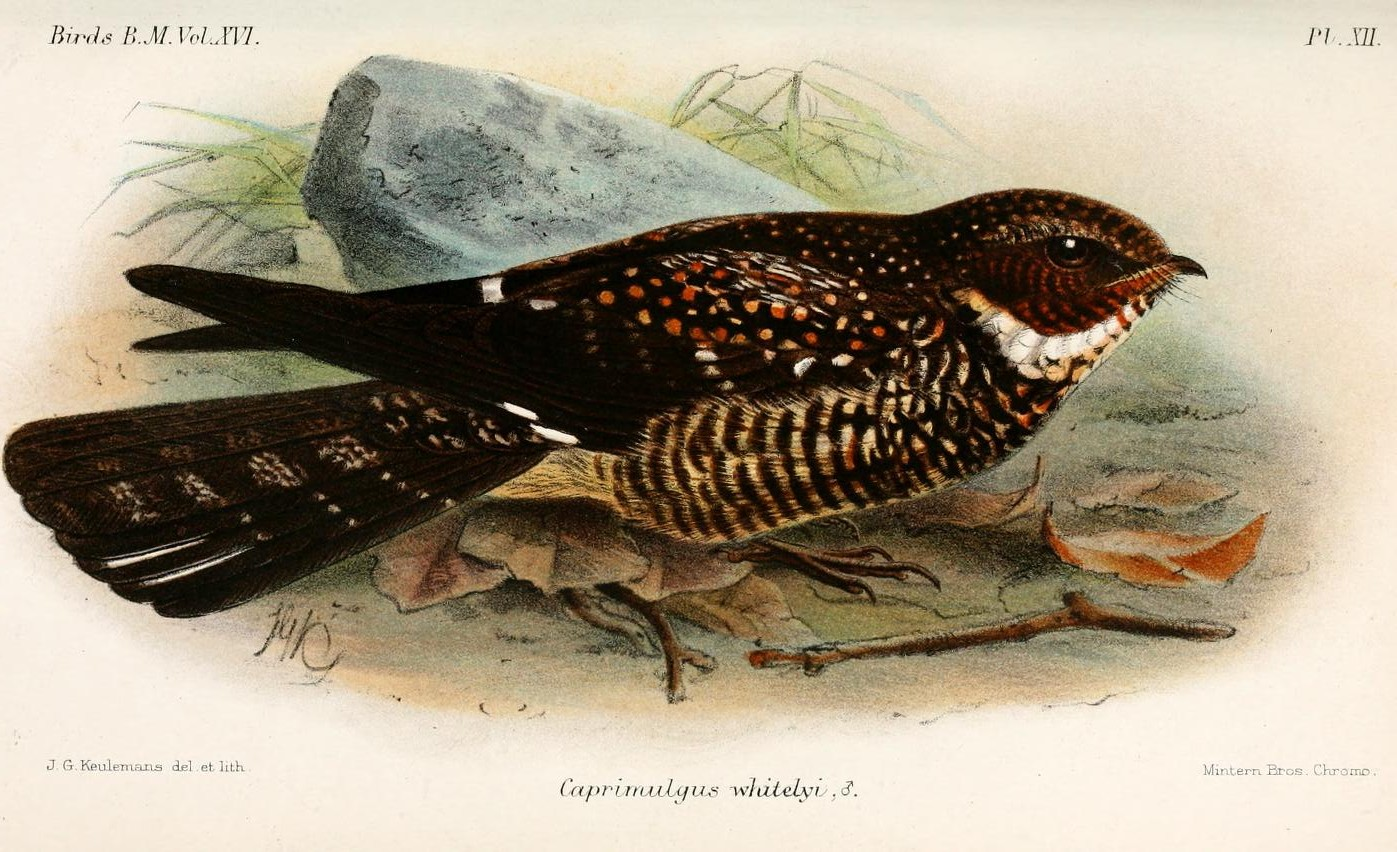
- Illustration by Keulemans, 1892

Conservation status
- Least Concern (IUCN 3.1)

Scientific classification
- Kingdom: Animalia
- Phylum: Chordata
- Class: Aves
- Clade: Strisores
- Order: Caprimulgiformes
- Family: Caprimulgidae
- Genus: Tepuiornis; Costa, TVV; van Els, P; Braun, MJ; Whitney, BM; Cleere, N; Sigurðsson, S; Silveira, LF, 2023
- Species: T. whitelyi

Binomial name
- Tepuiornis whitelyi (Salvin, 1885)

Synonyms
- Anstrotomus whitelyi; Caprimulgus whitelyi; Hydropsalis whitelyi; Setopagis whitelyi

= Roraiman nightjar =

Species of bird

The Roraiman nightjar (Tepuiornis whitelyi) is a species of nightjar in the family Caprimulgidae. It is found in Brazil, Guyana, and Venezuela.

== Taxonomy ==
The Roraiman nightjar was formally described in 1885 as Antrostomus whitelyi by the English naturalist Osbert Salvin based on a specimen collected on Mount Roraima in British Guiana by the ornithologist Henry Whitely. The specific epithet was chosen to honour the collector. The species was formerly placed in the genus Setopagis but a 2023 molecular genetic study of the nightjars by Snorri Sigurðsson and Joel Cracraft found that the Roraiman nightjar was only distantly related to the other members of the genus. In 2025 the AviList team moved the species to a new monotypic genus, Tepuiornis, that had been proposed by Thiago Costa and coworkers in 2023. The genus name combines Tepui, a table-top mountain, and the Ancient Greek ορνις/ornis meaning "bird". The species is monotypic: no subspecies are recognised.

== Description ==
The Roraiman nightjar is 21 to 22.4 cm (8.3 to 8.8 in) long. Males weigh 30 to 40 g (1.1 to 1.4 oz) and females 45 to 48 g (1.6 to 1.7 oz). The male's upperparts are blackish brown with cinnamon and grayish spots. The tail feathers are dark brown; the outermost three pairs have faint but broad pale buff bars and two pairs have large white spots at their tips. The wings are mostly dark brown with a thin white bar near the end and white spots near the body. The chin and upper throat are dark brown, the lower throat white, the breast dark brown with pale buff bars, and the belly and flanks pale buff with brown bars. The female is more brownish than blackish, the wing spots and bars are smaller and buffy instead of white, and the white spots on the tail are smaller.

== Distribution and habitat ==
The Roraiman nightjar is found in the tepui region at the junction of southeastern Venezuela, southwestern Guyana, and northernmost Brazil. It inhabits open areas such as savanna, clearings, and the edges of forest. In elevation it ranges between 1,280 and 1,800 m (4,200 and 5,900 ft) in Venezuela but has been recorded as low as 850 m (2,790 ft) in Guyana.

== Behavior ==
=== Feeding ===
The Roraiman nightjar is nocturnal. Little is known about its foraging behavior, whether it forages by sallying from the ground or a low perch and/or during continuous flight.

=== Breeding ===
The Roraiman nightjar's breeding biology is unknown. It is assumed to lay one or two eggs directly on the ground like other nightjars.

=== Vocalization ===
The Roraiman nightjar's song is "a burry hreeer, rising then falling in pitch, and repeated at intervals of 1-2 seconds."

== Status ==
The IUCN originally in 1988 assessed the Roraiman nightjar as Near Threatened and since 2004 as being of Least Concern. Its population size is unknown and is believed to be decreasing. The primary threat is habitat modification either intentional or by fire; the tepui vegetation when damaged does not regrow but is replaced by vegetation less suitable for the nightjar.
