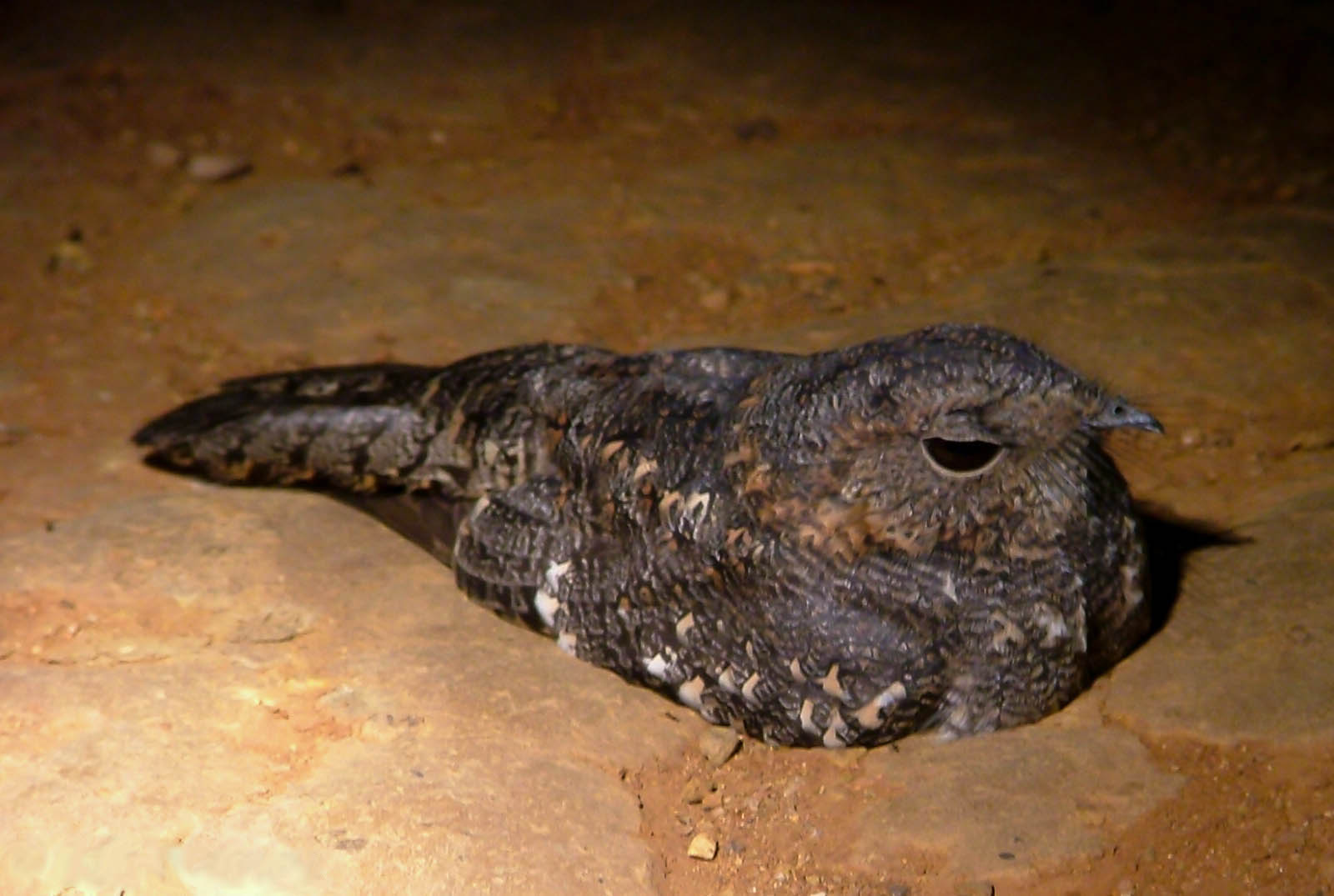
- Band-winged Nightjar (Systellura longirostris)

Conservation status
- Least Concern (IUCN 3.1)

Scientific classification
- Kingdom: Animalia
- Phylum: Chordata
- Class: Aves
- Order: Caprimulgiformes
- Family: Caprimulgidae
- Genus: Quechuavis van Els, P; Costa, TVV; Braun, MJ; Whitney, BM; Cleere, N; Sigurðsson, S; Silveira, LF, 2023
- Species: Q. decussata

Binomial name
- Quechuavis decussata (Tschudi, 1844)

Synonyms
- Caprimulgus decussatus; Caprimulgus longirostris decussatus; Systellura longirostris decussata; Systellura decussata

= Tschudi's nightjar =

Species of bird

Tschudi's nightjar or lesser band-winged nightjar (Quechuavis decussata) is a species of nightjar in the family Caprimulgidae. It is found in Chile and Peru.

== Taxonomy ==
Tschudi's nightjar was formally described as Caprimulgus decussatus in 1844 by the Swiss naturalist Johann Jakob von Tschudi based on a specimen collected in Peru. The specific epithet is Latin meaning "marked with crosses", from decussis meaning "ten" (X in Roman numerals).

Tschudi's nightjar has a complicated taxonomic history. It was originally considered a species, then a subspecies of band-winged nightjar (Systellura longirostris). The species was formerly placed in the genus Systellura but a 2014 molecular genetic study of the nightjars by Snorri Sigurðsson and Joel Cracraft found that the Tschudi's nightjar was only distantly related to the other member of the genus, the band-winged nightjar. Tschudi's nightjar was therefore moved to new monotypic genus, Quechuavis, that had been proposed in 2023 by Thiago Costa and coworkers. The genus name is a combination of Quechua, an indigenous people of South America, and the Latin avis meaning bird. The species is monotypic: no subspecies are recognised.

== Description ==
Tschudi's nightjar is 20 to 21 cm (7.9 to 8.3 in) long. Males weigh 28.5 to 35 g (1.0 to 1.2 oz) and females about 32 g (1.1 oz). It is overall grayish brown with blackish speckles. The male has a broad tawny or cinnamon collar on the hindneck, a small white patch on the throat, white bands on the wing, and white bands and tips on the tail. The female's throat is buff, the bands on the wing are buff, and the tail usually has no white.

== Distribution and habitat ==
Tschudi's nightjar is found along most of western Peru and extreme northern Chile. It inhabits the littoral and foothills in this arid landscape. It generally keeps to open country, clearings, and wooded edges though it is also found in urban areas including Lima, Peru. In Peru it ranges from sea level to 1,300 m (4,300 ft) but has been reported as high as 3,350 m (11,000 ft) in Chile.

== Behavior ==
=== Feeding ===
Nothing is known about Tschudi's nightjar's diet or feeding behavior.

=== Breeding ===
The breeding season of Tschudi's nightjar is thought to be from November or earlier to January. Essentially nothing else is known about its breeding biology.

=== Vocalization ===
Tschudi's nightjar's song is "a loud series of well-defined, but slightly buzzy 'cueeo' notes". Its alarm call is "a slightly squeaky-sounding 'wick'".

== Status ==
The IUCN has assessed Tschudi's nightjar as being of Least Concern. It has a range estimated at 472,000 km^{2} (182,000 sq mi), and though its population has not been quantified it is thought to be stable.
