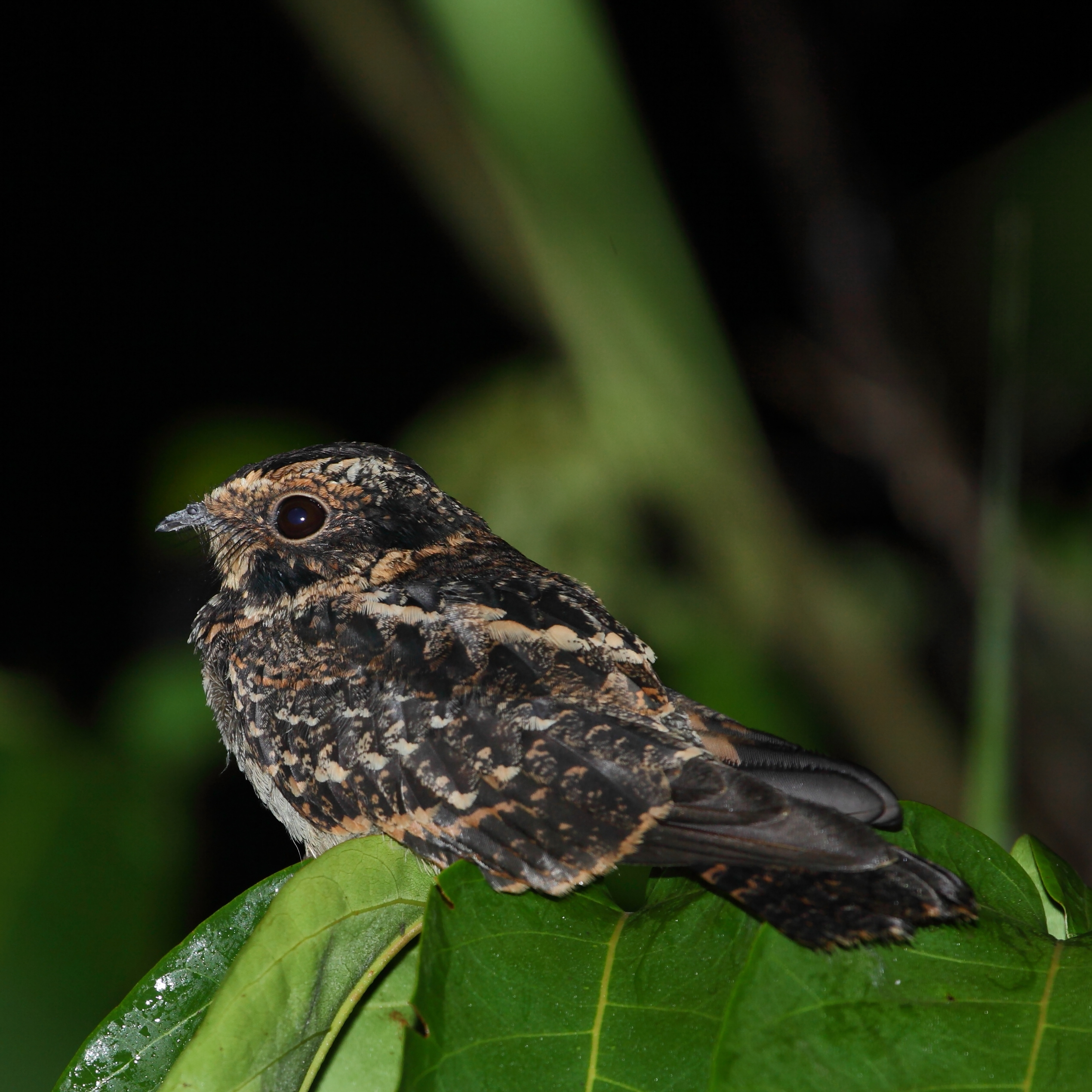

Conservation status
- Least Concern (IUCN 3.1)

Scientific classification
- Kingdom: Animalia
- Phylum: Chordata
- Class: Aves
- Order: Caprimulgiformes
- Family: Caprimulgidae
- Genus: Antiurus; Ridgway, R, 1912
- Species: A. maculicaudus

Binomial name
- Antiurus maculicaudus (Lawrence, 1862)
- Breeding Resident

Synonyms
- Stenopsis maculicaudus; Caprimulgus maculicaudus; Hydropsalis maculicaudus

= Spot-tailed nightjar =

Species of bird

The spot-tailed nightjar (Antiurus maculicaudus) is a species of nightjar in the family Caprimulgidae. It is the only species placed in the genus Antiurus. It is found in Honduras, Mexico, Nicaragua, and every mainland South American country except Chile and Uruguay.

== Taxonomy ==
The spot-tailed nightjar was formally described in 1862 as Stenopsis maculicaudus by the American amateur ornithologist George Newbold Lawrence. His specimen had been collected in the Brazilian state of Pará. The specific epithet combines the Latin macula meaning "spot" with cauda meaning "tail". The spot-tailed nightjar was formerly placed in the genus Hydropsalis but based on the results of a 2014 molecular genetic study by Snorri Sigurðsson and Joel Cracraft, it is now the only species placed in the resurrected genus Antiurus that had been introduced in 1912 by the American ornithologist Robert Ridgway. The genus name combines the Ancient Greek αντιος/antios meaning "different" with ουρα/oura meaning "tail". The species is monotypic: no subspecies are recognised.

== Description ==
The spot-tailed nightjar is 20.3 to 21.5 cm (8.0 to 8.5 in) long. Males weigh 28.3 to 35.2 g (1.0 to 1.2 oz) and females 26.0 to 39.0 g (0.92 to 1.4 oz). Their upperparts are brown, darker on the crown and paler on the rump, and spotted and barred with buff or tawny. The face is tawny or rufous with dark brown speckles, and a broad buff supercilium. The hindneck has a broad cinnamon band. The wings are mostly brown with tawny spots. The four outer tail feathers on each side are dark brown with tawny markings, two or three large white spots, and (on only the male) white tips that have a buff wash. The inner tail feathers are slightly longer than the outer ones and colored grayish brown with brown speckles and bars. The chin, throat, and breast are cinnamon to buff and the belly and flanks buff.

== Distribution ==
The spot-tailed nightjar's distribution is highly discontinuous. One population is found in southern Mexico. Another is on the Caribbean slope in eastern Honduras and northern Nicaragua. In South America, one population is centered in eastern Colombia and extends into western Venezuela, far northwestern Brazil, and slightly into Ecuador. A second stretches from eastern Venezuela through Guyana and Suriname into French Guiana. A third resides near the mouth of the Amazon River in northeastern Brazil. The largest (in area) is found from far southeastern Peru across Bolivia and a wide swath of southern Brazil and south barely into Paraguay and Argentina. In elevation it ranges from lowlands to 500 m (1,600 ft) in Mexico, to 400 m (1,300 ft) in Colombia, to 1,000 m (3,300 ft) in Venezuela, and to 1,350 m (4,400 ft) in Peru.

== Behavior ==
=== Movement ===
The South American populations of spot-tailed nightjar are apparently sedentary and those in Central American migratory.

=== Feeding ===
The spot-tailed nightjar is nocturnal. It forages by sallying from the ground or during low, slow, flight. Its diet is entirely insects; it has been documented preying on insects of at least 17 families in six orders.

=== Breeding ===
The spot-tailed nightjar's breeding seasons have not been fully defined but vary considerably among the different populations. They lay their two eggs (rarely one) directly on the ground without a nest.

=== Vocalization ===
The spot-tailed nightjar's song is "a high lisping 'tip-SEEEUUEEET'", and is sung both from the ground and from a perch. It has "a rapid t-seet t-seet t-seet t-seet" call and a "slightly wailing seeeu or see-ee-eeii in flight".

== Status ==
The IUCN has assessed the spot-tailed nightjar as being of Least Concern. It has a large range and a large, stable, population. No immediate threats have been identified.
