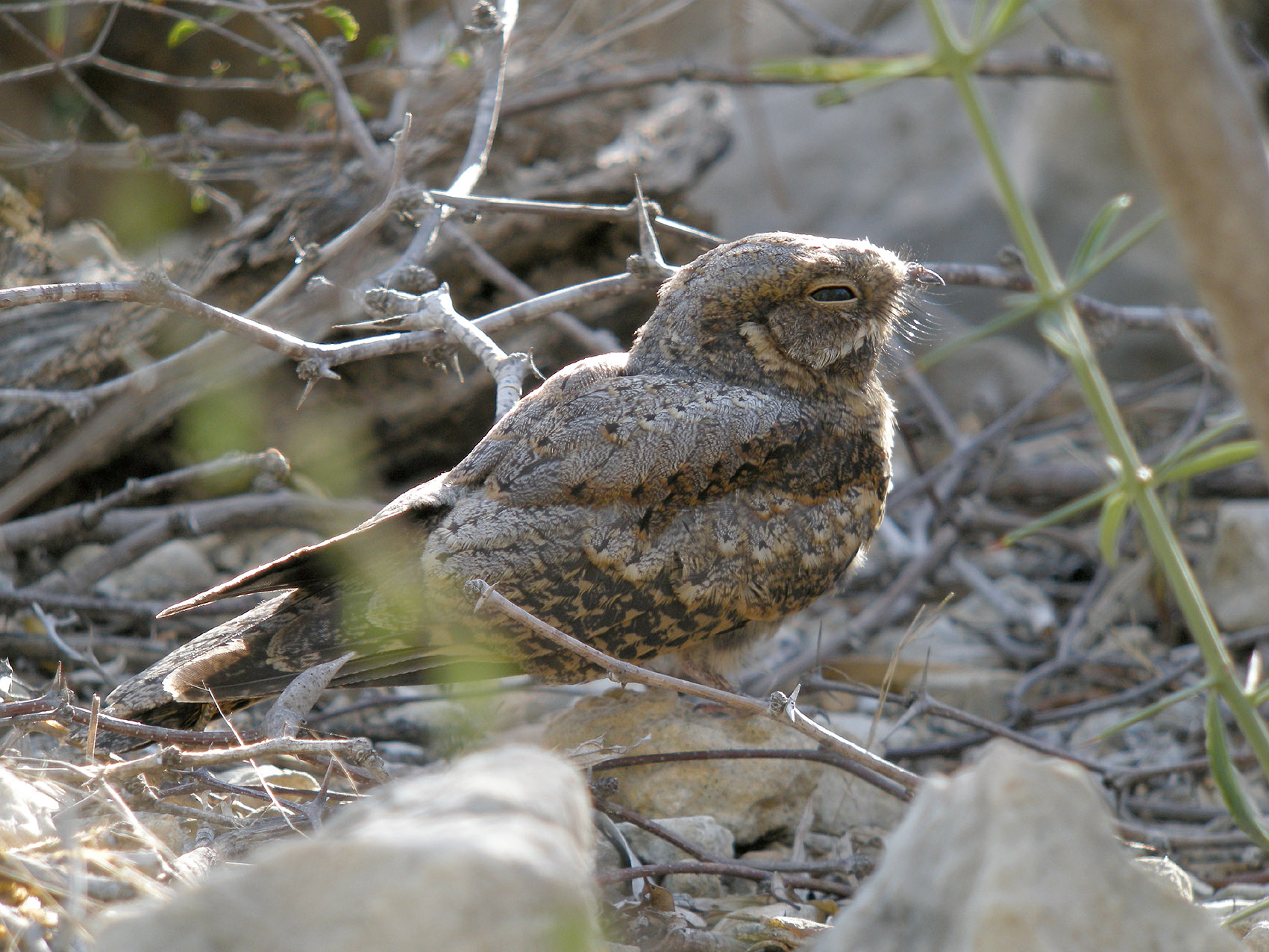

Conservation status
- Least Concern (IUCN 3.1)

Scientific classification
- Kingdom: Animalia
- Phylum: Chordata
- Class: Aves
- Clade: Strisores
- Order: Caprimulgiformes
- Family: Caprimulgidae
- Genus: Caprimulgus
- Species: C. madagascariensis

Binomial name
- Caprimulgus madagascariensis Sganzin, 1840

= Madagascar nightjar =

Species of bird

The Madagascar nightjar or Madagascan nightjar (Caprimulgus madagascariensis) is a species of nightjar in the family Caprimulgidae. It is native to Madagascar, Nosy Boraha and Aldabra. Its natural habitats are subtropical or tropical moist lowland forest and subtropical or tropical moist montane forest.
