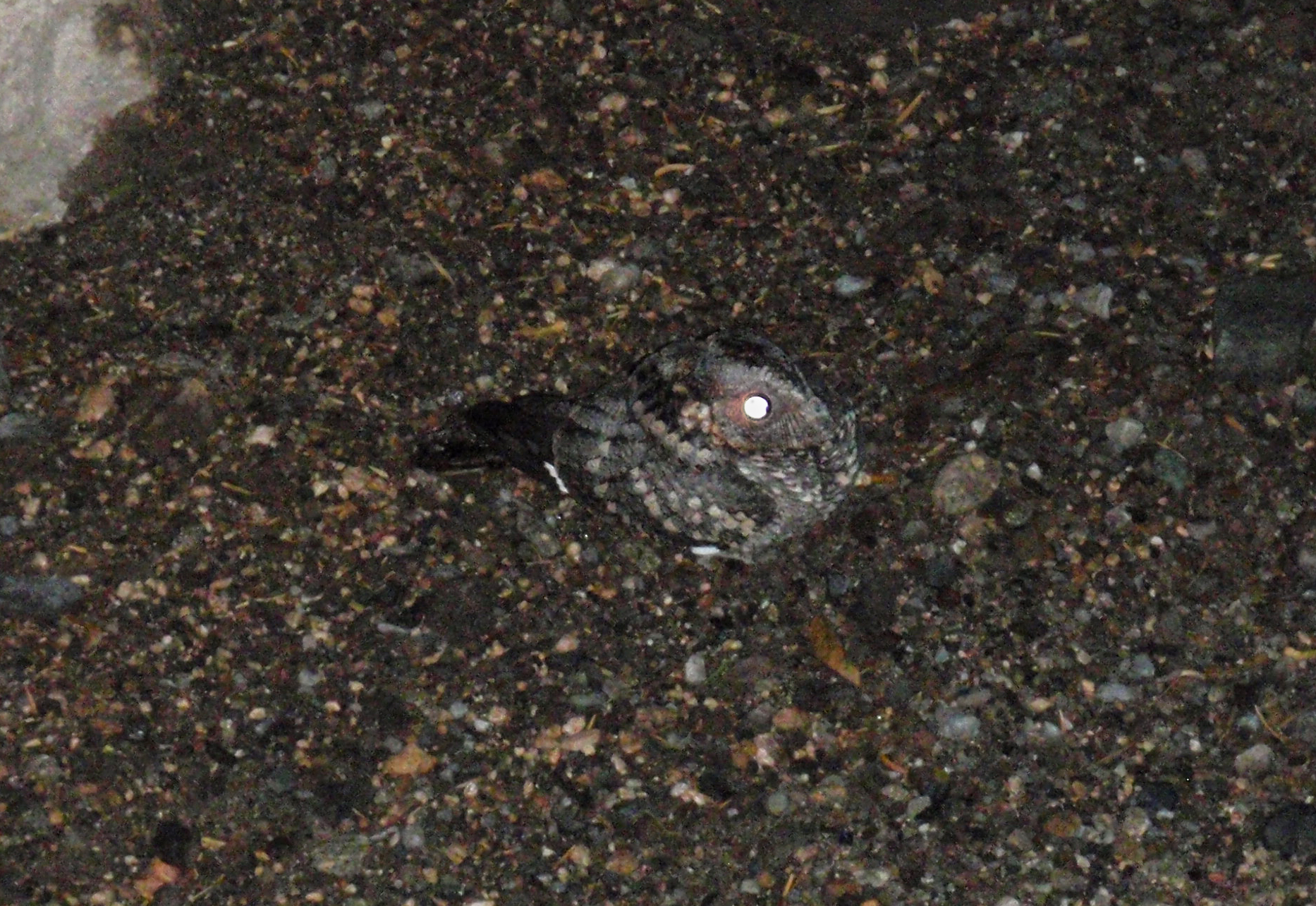

Conservation status
- Least Concern (IUCN 3.1)

Scientific classification
- Kingdom: Animalia
- Phylum: Chordata
- Class: Aves
- Clade: Strisores
- Order: Caprimulgiformes
- Family: Caprimulgidae
- Genus: Systellura; Ridgway, 1912
- Species: S. longirostris

Binomial name
- Systellura longirostris (Bonaparte, 1825)
- Non-Breeding Year-round Breeding

Audio

= Band-winged nightjar =

Species of bird

The band-winged nightjar or greater band-winged nightjar (Systellura longirostris) is a species of nightjar in the family Caprimulgidae. It is the only species now placed in the genus Systellura. It is widespread in South America, where it is found in the Andes, Venezuelan Coastal Range, Santa Marta Mountains, Tepuis, most of Chile, Argentina, Paraguay, Uruguay, and eastern Brazil. It occurs in a wide range of habitats, from the edge of humid montane forests to shrubby semi-deserts and urban rooftops.

== Taxonomy ==
The band-winged nightjar was formally described in 1825 as Caprimulgus longirostris by the French naturalist Charles Lucien Bonaparte. The specific epithet combines the Latin longus meaning "long" with -rostris meaning "-billed". The band-winged nightjar is now the only species placed in the genus Systellura that was introduced in 1912 by the American ornithologist Robert Ridgway with Stenopis ruficervix Sclater, PL, 1866, as the type species. This is now considered as a subspecies of the band-winged nightjar. The genus name Systellura combines the Ancient Greek συστελλω/sustellō meaning "to shorten" with ουρα'oura meaning "tail".

=== Subspecies ===
Eight subspecies have been recognized, including two subspecies descovered in the 21st century, one from Chile and another from Brazil which have been described within the last few years. Tschudi's nightjar was formerly also considered a subspecies but has now been elevated to species rank. Recently, it has been suggested that both S. l. roraimae and S. l. ruficervix should be treated as separate species.

- Systellura longirostris ruficervix (Sclater, 1866) - Colombia, Venezuela and Ecuador
- Systellura longirostris roraimae Chapman, 1929 - tepuis of southern Venezuela
- Systellura longirostris atripunctata Chapman, 1923 - Peru to northwestern Argentina
- Systellura longirostris bifasciata (Gould, 1837) - Chile, western Argentina
- Systellura longirostris pedrolimai (Grantsau, 2008) - northeastern Brazil
- Systellura longirostris longirostris (Bonaparte, 1825) - southeastern Brazil, Paraguay, Uruguay and northeastern Argentina
- Systellura longirostris mochaensis (Cleere, 2006) - central Chile
- Systellura longirostris patagonica (Olrog, 1962) - central and southern Argentina

== Description ==
Over its large range, there are significant variations in its morphology, but, as suggested by its common name, it always has a distinctive band in the wing (best visible in flight), which is white in the male and buff in the female.

This nightjar has a length that varies from 20 to 27 cm (for Ecuador, 21.5 to 23 cm). The iris, bill, legs, and feet vary from brown to blackish brown. On the upper side, a greyish-brown, blackish-brown, brownish-orange, pale yellowish-brown, and greyish-white coloration can be distinguished. The rear of the neck is from a brownish orange to a yellowish brown. Wing-coverts acquire a greyish-brown coloration accompanied by dense spotted yellowish to greyish brown. Scapulars are blackish brown. In males sometimes white and in females sometimes a yellowish-brown mark around the lower throat. The belly and flanks become brown or yellowish brown. In flight sights, the male has white marks at the edge of the first four primaries, as well as a white band on the first and fourth rectrices. The female does not possess the white mark on the tail.

The face of the male can be greyish brown with brown marks; the crown and margins of the forehead are greyish white. A yellowish-brown to brownish-orange collar is formed at the edges of the neck. The dorsal side has a dark greyish-brown coloration with some blackish-brown spots. Alula and the edges of the wing-coverts are white. The background of wing-coverts is predominantly brown, spotted yellowish brown with brown spots. Scapulars are blackish brown, with yellowish-brown dots and brown spots. The Primaries 7th-10th and the secondary feathers are brown with a midway white streak; the contour of P6-P1 is yellowish-brown by the edges and brownish orange with small brown marks. Tertiaries feathers are greyish brown with brown dots. The tail is mainly brown; with white marks at the third and fifth rectrices with brownish orange and yellowish brown as contours, usually a 10mm white band is marked across half of the middle-upper inner web, with white dots with yellowish brown at the outer edge over the band in the third and second rectrices. Chin and upper throat yellowish brown, prominent white band at the bottom of the throat. Breast, belly, flanks, and ventral coverts vary from greyish brown or brown to yellowish brown.

Unlike males, females have a yellowish-brown throat; across the 7th-10th primaries, a brownish orange to yellowish brown is denoted and the tail lacks white marks. Juveniles and immatures are similar to the adults but less specked, with a small brownish-orange band narrow at the primary feathers.

Fledglings are born with cryptic plumules that help them blend in with the surrounding ground material to avoid predation. It takes approximately eight days for the coloration of this plumage to start resembling that of the adults. They hatch with their eyes partially opened and stay motionless during the first day. The first flights or short glides begin after the 12th day under the vigilance of an adult (it is not specified if the care is shared by parents or is it just one), and displacement of fledglings increases with time. The weight of the egg is approximately 3.03 g and that of the fledglings 4.63 ± 0.25 g.

=== Vocalizations ===
The species has a variety of calls. The territorial tone is a high-sharp whistle, seeeeert sweeeert seeeet, constantly repeated every 1 to 3 seconds. Whistles can be heard at dusk or dawn. The flight whistle is usually heard during the breeding season as a high cheet. Females when flushed produce a nasal sound like tchree-ee.

== Distribution and habitat ==
The band-winged nightjar is a South American species that can be found at elevations of up to 4200 m. Its habitat ranges from the forest edge to semi-arid shrublands, open areas, and even on the roofs of buildings. They are mainly nocturnal birds. They roost in a variety of environments, from the forest floor to buildings. In Rio de Janeiro, band-winged nightjars have shown a behavioural plasticity, as they roost near sources of light in order to eat the insects that are attracted there.

== Behaviour and ecology ==
=== Food ===
Band-winged nightjars feed on insects, mainly moths, beetles, and termites.

=== Breeding ===
The breeding season varies by region. In western Venezuela, it is from February–September; For Ecuador, Colombia, and Chile, it is believed to be around late July, February to November, and November, respectively; and for Argentina and SE Brazil (Río de Janeiro) from September to October. Band-winged nightjars do not construct a nest, instead, the eggs are laid on a ground depression in dense vegetation, bare ground, or the side of roads. Usually, they lay 1-2 elliptical eggs each breeding season, which vary in colour from creamy pink, whitish, spotted brown, lilac, and grey.

Eggs are approximately 25 mm long by 20 mm wide and weigh ~5 g. The asynchrony of the laid eggs can cause differences in the dimensions among eggs of the same clutch. In courtship, the male bends over to the ground, revealing the white spots on the rectrices. The eggs hatch after a period of 17 days. Females invest intense periods of time during the day (~14 h), while males normally only spend 20% of their time with the clutch. Parents normally abandon the nest during dust or dawn; there is no evidence of parents moving eggs from the nest.
