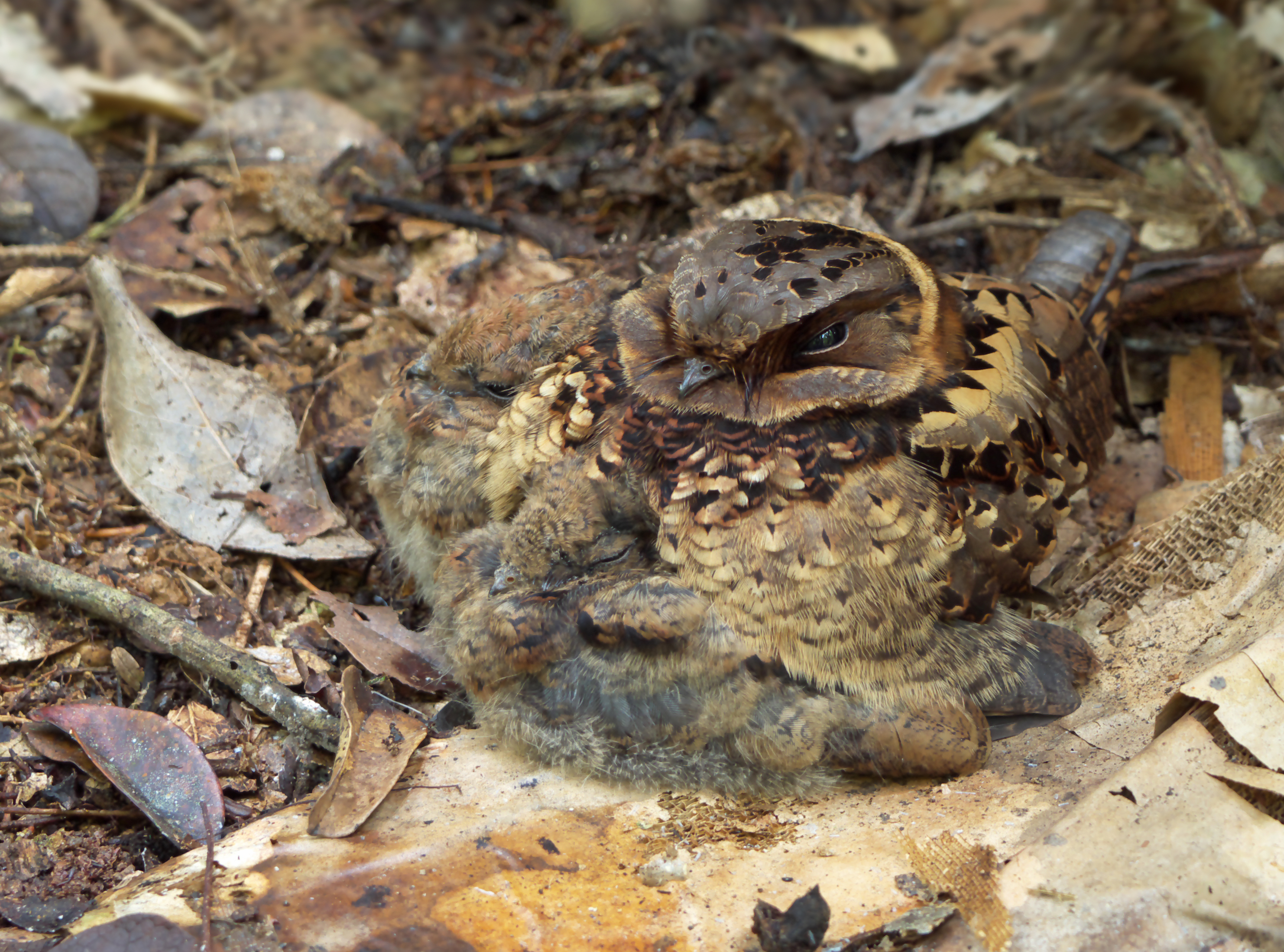

Conservation status
- Near Threatened (IUCN 3.1)

Scientific classification
- Kingdom: Animalia
- Phylum: Chordata
- Class: Aves
- Order: Caprimulgiformes
- Family: Caprimulgidae
- Genus: Gactornis; Han, Robbins & Braun, M, 2010
- Species: G. enarratus

Binomial name
- Gactornis enarratus (Gray, GR, 1871)

Synonyms
- Caprimulgus enarratus

= Collared nightjar =

Species of bird

The collared nightjar (Gactornis enarratus) is a species of nightjar in the family Caprimulgidae. It is endemic to Madagascar.

Its natural habitats are subtropical or tropical moist lowland forest.

== Taxonomy ==
The collared nightjar was formally described in 1871 by the English zoologist George Gray with the binomial name Caprimulgus enarratus based on a specimen collected in Madagascar. The specific epithet is Latin meaning "explained in detail".

A molecular phylogenetic study by Kin-Lan Han and collaborators published in 2010 found that the collared nightjar was not closely related to any other species of nightjar. The authors therefore introduced a new genus Gactornis to accommodate the species. The genus name combines the four single letter abbreviations for the DNA nucleotides (G, A, C, T for guanine, adenine, cytosine, thymine) and the Ancient Greek word ornis meaning "bird". The species is monotypic: no subspecies are recognised.

== Appearance ==
Collared nightjars are 24cm long, with females weighing around 57 g (2.0 oz) and males around 48 g (1.7 oz). Otherwise sexes are similar.

== Behaviour ==
=== Feeding ===
Forages for insects by hawking both above and below forest canopy. Has also been observed flycatching from an exposed perch at a height of 20 m (70 ft), situated at the edge of a forest clearing, flying off in short spurts covering around 10 m (33 ft). One of these flycatching bouts lasted 15 minutes.

=== Breeding ===
Breeds between late September and early December, generally at the edge of a forest clearing or track. They don't build nests in the typical sense, as eggs are laid either on the ground leaf, on epiphytic ferns (up 1.7 m (5 ft 7 in) off the ground), or in the crowns of freestanding ferns (up to 1.5 m (4 ft 11 in) off the ground). Eggs are white, often with a pinkish-brown tinge, and young are downy. Information about incubation period or fledglings is currently unknown.

=== Vocal behaviour ===
Adult alarm calls near the nest consist of liquid, repetitive notes of "kow" or "keeow". Adults also make guttural hissings while doing threatening or defensive displays. Chicks produce soft 'chic' sounds.

== Conservation status ==
Near threatened. Generally considered rare, though possibly also under recorded due to their secretive nature.Their threats include hunting and habitat destruction (generally deforestation).
