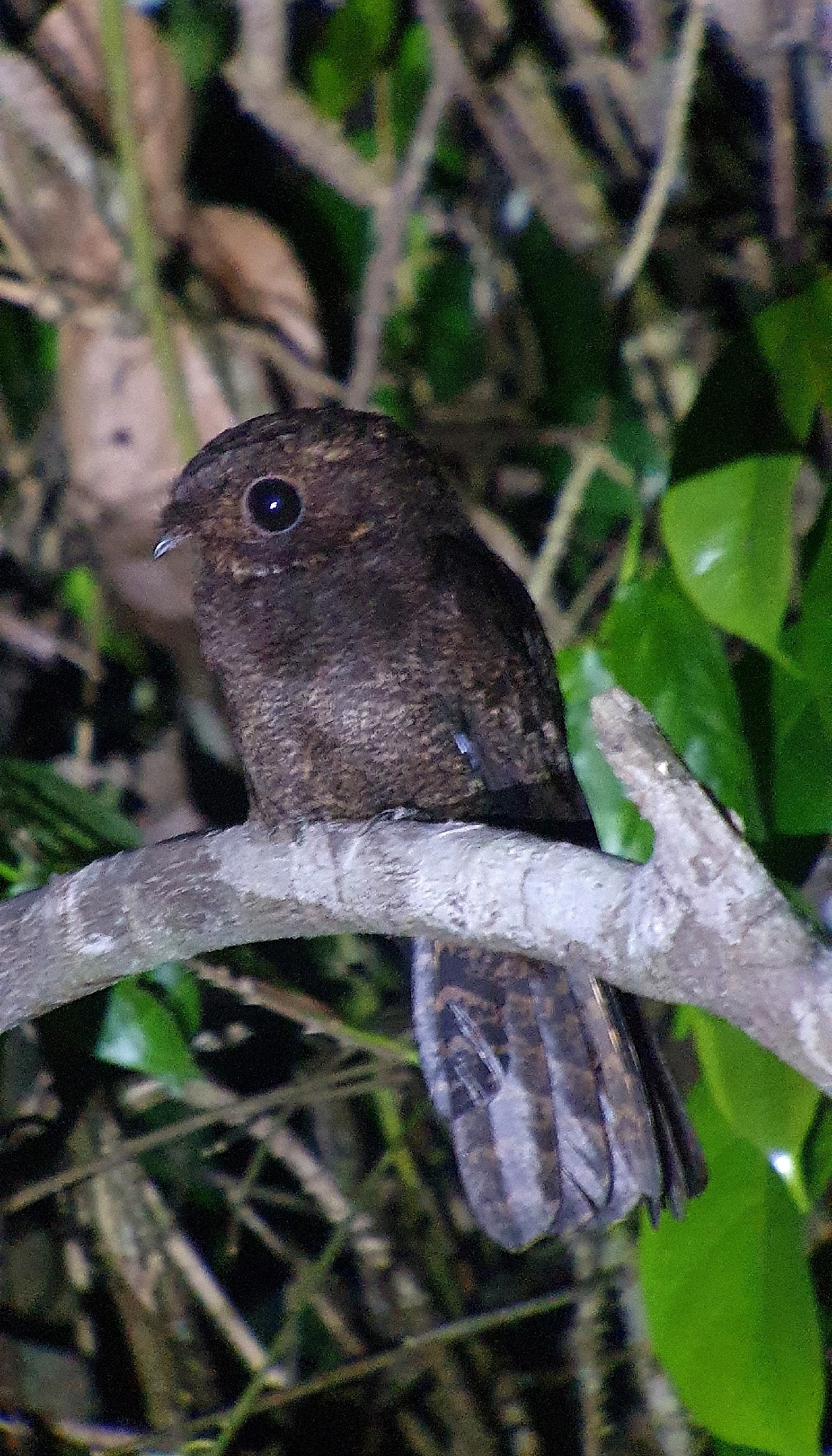

Conservation status
- Least Concern (IUCN 3.1)

Scientific classification
- Kingdom: Animalia
- Phylum: Chordata
- Class: Aves
- Clade: Strisores
- Order: Caprimulgiformes
- Family: Caprimulgidae
- Genus: Veles; Bangs, 1918
- Species: V. binotatus

Binomial name
- Veles binotatus (Bonaparte, 1850)

Synonyms
- Caprimulgus binotatus

= Brown nightjar =

Species of bird

The brown nightjar (Veles binotatus) is a species of nightjar in the family Caprimulgidae. It is the only species in the genus Veles. It is found in Cameroon, Central African Republic, Republic of the Congo, Democratic Republic of the Congo, Ivory Coast, Gabon, Ghana, and Liberia.

The brown nightjar is 21–23 cm (8.3–9.1 in) in overall length and has upperparts that are dark brown with dense tawny mottling. Very little is known about the behaviour. Its call, a metallic "kliou" note given at one second intervals, was first described in 1998. Its relationship to other species of nightjar is uncertain as it has not been included in a molecular phylogenetic study.
