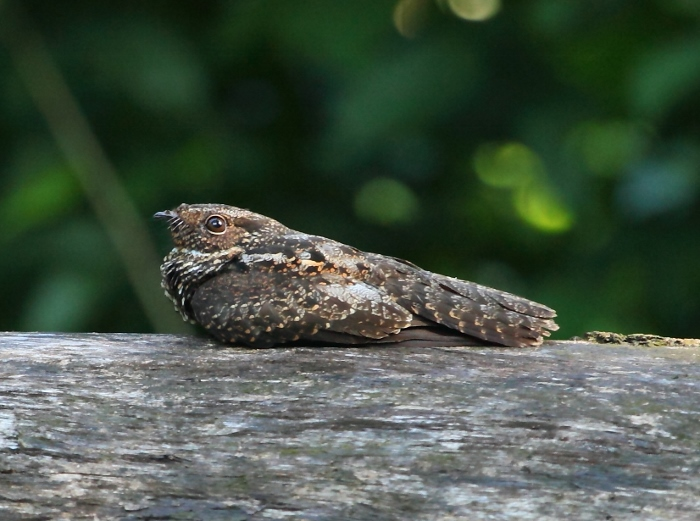
- at Apiacás, Mato Grosso state, Brazil

Conservation status
- Least Concern (IUCN 3.1)

Scientific classification
- Kingdom: Animalia
- Phylum: Chordata
- Class: Aves
- Order: Caprimulgiformes
- Family: Caprimulgidae
- Genus: Nyctipolus
- Species: N. nigrescens

Binomial name
- Nyctipolus nigrescens (Cabanis, 1849)

Synonyms
- Caprimulgus nigrescens

= Blackish nightjar =

Species of bird

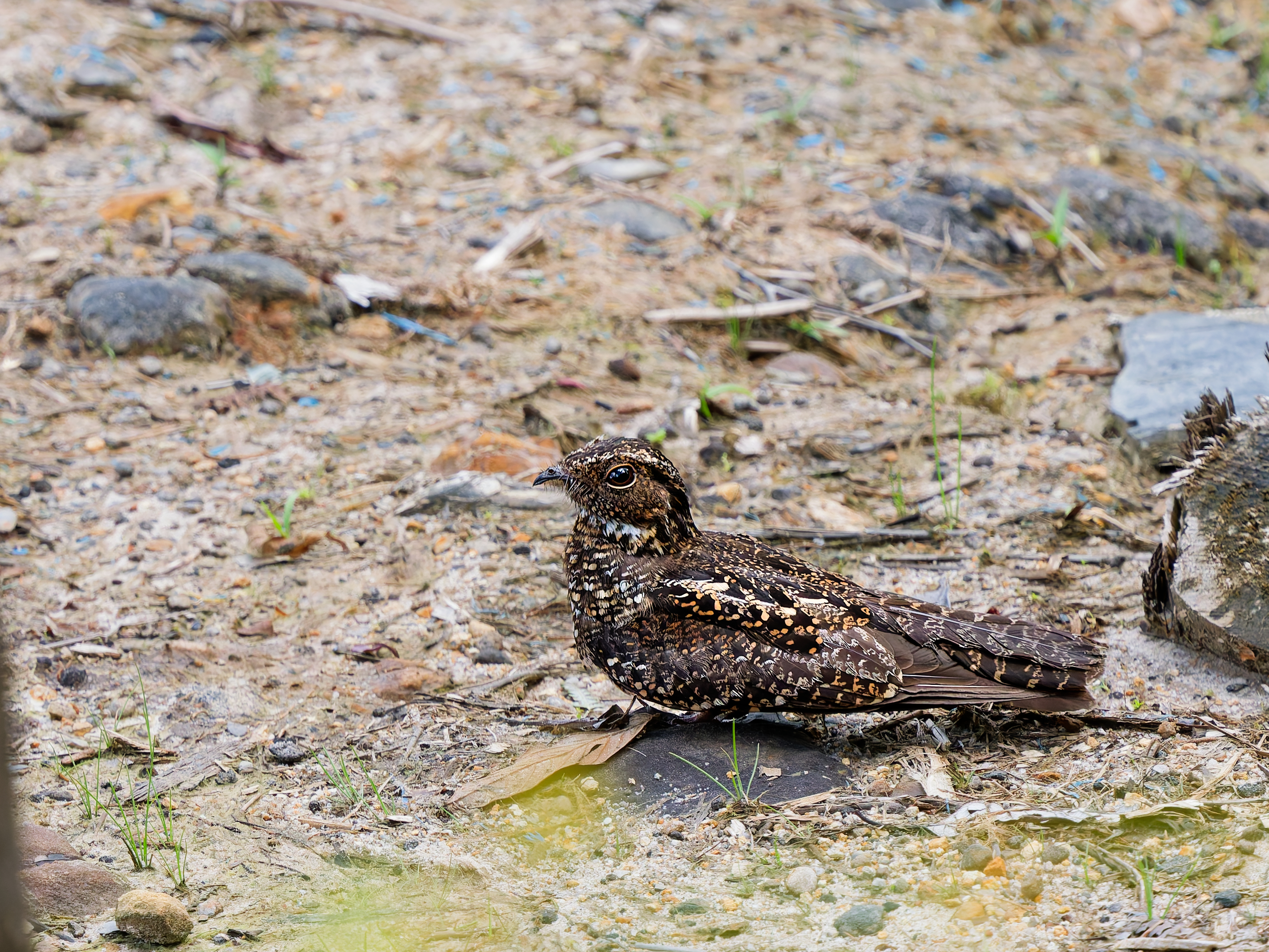
Blackish Nightjar

The blackish nightjar (Nyctipolus nigrescens) is a species of bird in the family Caprimulgidae. It is found in Brazil, Bolivia, Colombia, Ecuador, French Guiana, Guyana, Peru, Suriname, and Venezuela.

== Taxonomy and systematics ==
The blackish nightjar was originally placed in genus Caprimulgus, but DNA analyses show that it and its sister species pygmy nightjar (Nyctipolus hirundinaceus) require their own genus. The blackish nightjar is monotypic.

== Description ==
The blackish nightjar is 19.5 to 21.5 cm (7.7 to 8.5 in) long and weighs 32 to 39 g (1.1 to 1.4 oz). Its upperparts are blackish brown with tawny, grayish white, and cinnamon spots. Its tail is dark brown with indistinct lighter bars and mottling and (on the male) a white tip. The underparts to the belly are dark brown with paler baring; the belly and flanks are buffy with darker barring. The throat has a small white patch on either side. In flight the wing shows a small white band.

== Distribution and habitat ==
The blackish nightjar is found east of the Andes in Peru, Ecuador, and southern Colombia, and across southern Colombia through southern Venezuela and the Guianas into northeastern and north-central Brazil. They inhabit lowland evergreen forest, but are mostly found on or near open rock outcroppings or on sand and gravel bars along small rivers. In elevation it ranges from sea level in Brazil to 900 m (3,000 ft) in Bolivia, 800 m (2,600 ft) in Colombia, 1,200 m (3,900 ft) in Ecuador, and 1,100 m (3,600 ft) in Venezuela.

== Behavior ==
=== Feeding ===
The blackish nightjar is crepuscular and nocturnal. It forages on the wing from dusk to dawn over rock outcrops and above the forest canopy. It has also been recorded on foot picking prey from large rocks. Its diet has not been detailed but is known to include moths and beetles. During the day it roosts on rocks or fallen trees.

=== Breeding ===
The blackish nightjar's breeding season varies across its range but almost everywhere is during the long dry season of August to November. Males display to females by erecting the tail to show the white markings. Females lay a single egg, usually in a depression in bare rock though occasionally on bare sand or soil. They nest singly or sometimes in small loose colonies.

=== Vocalization ===
The blackish nightjar's song is short, "a soft, purring pu'r'r'r'r't or qu'r'r'r'rt". During the mating display both the male and female sing. They also make a cluck or ptink alarm call and a "guttural hissing" threat display.

== Status ==
The IUCN has assessed the blackish nightjar as being of Least Concern. Though its population size is not known, it is believed to be stable. It is common to abundant in suitable habitat.
