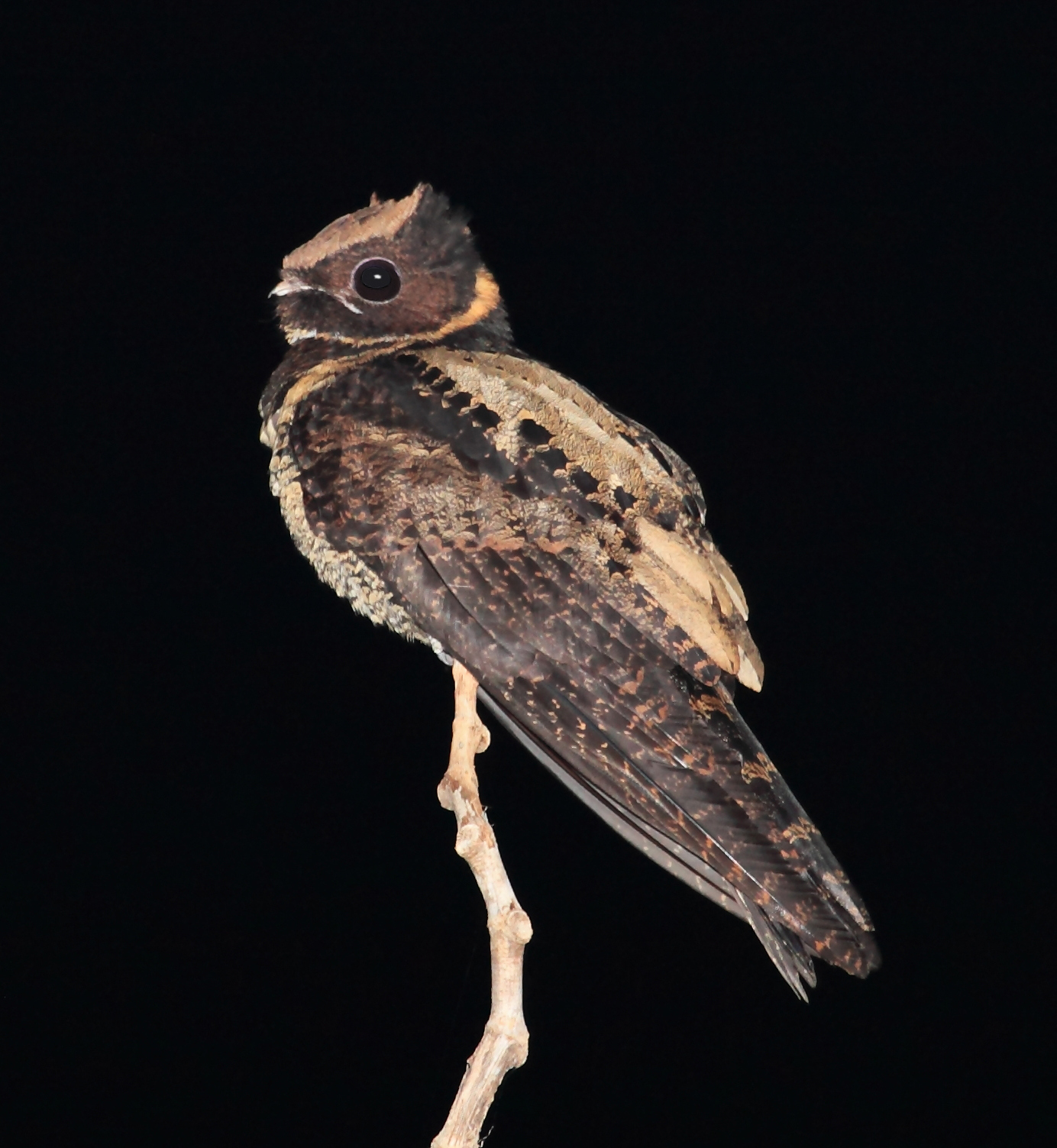
- Great eared nightjar (Lyncornis macrotis)

Scientific classification
- Kingdom: Animalia
- Phylum: Chordata
- Class: Aves
- Clade: Strisores
- Order: Caprimulgiformes; Ridgway, 1881
- Family: Caprimulgidae; Vigors, 1825
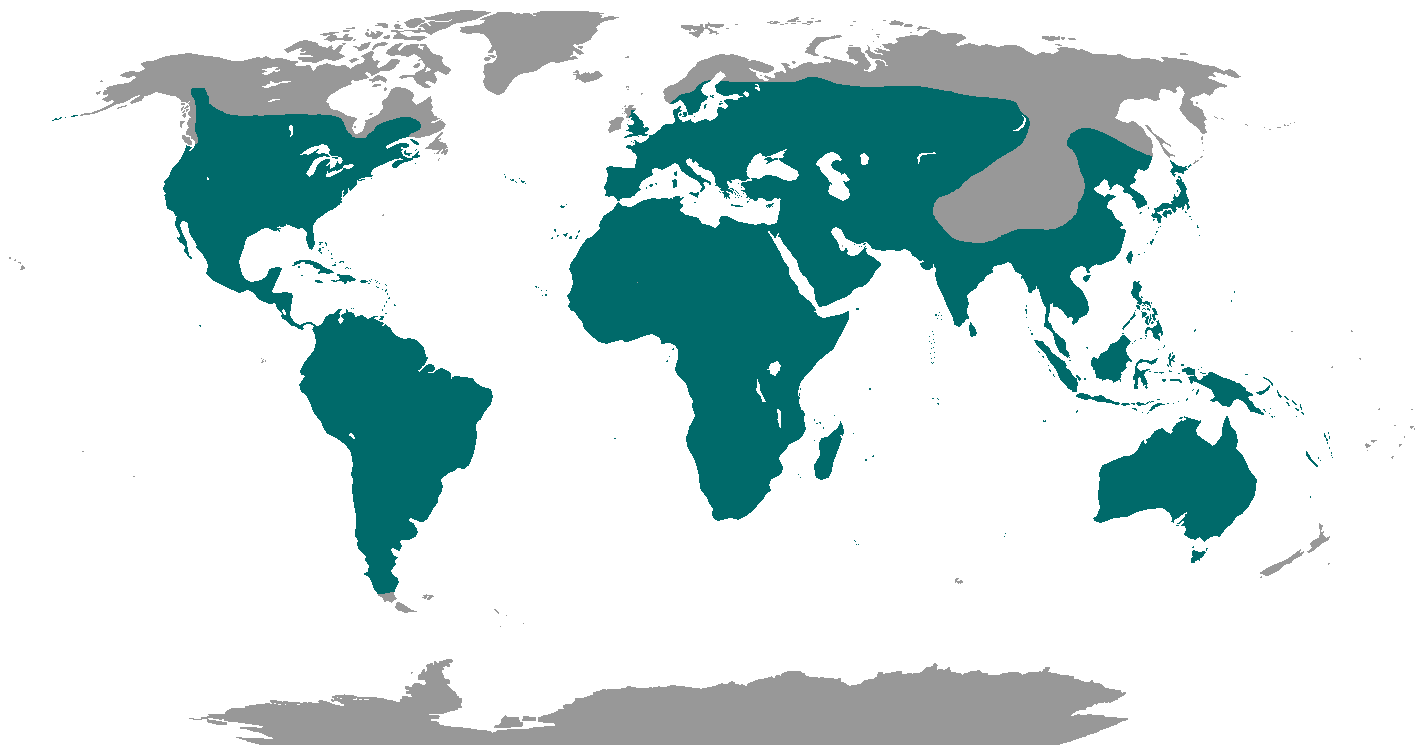
- Global range of nightjars and allies

= Nightjar =

Family of birds

Nightjars are medium-sized nocturnal or crepuscular birds in the family Caprimulgidae /ˌkæprɪˈmʌldʒɪdiː/ and order Caprimulgiformes, characterised by long wings, short legs, and very short bills. Some New World species are called nighthawks. The English word nightjar originally referred to the European nightjar.

Nightjars have a wide distribution, being found on all continents apart from Antarctica, and on certain island groups such as the Seychelles and New Caledonia. They can be found in a variety of habitats, most commonly the open country with some vegetation. They usually nest on the ground, with a habit of resting and roosting on roads.

Nightjars have similar characteristics, including small feet, of little use for walking, and long, pointed wings. Typical nightjars have rictal bristles, longer bills, and softer plumage. The colour of their plumage and their unusual perching habits help conceal them during the day, but they often possess contrasting pale patches or spots that likely serve in intraspecific communication.

== Systematics ==
=== Caprimulgiformes ===
Previously, all members of the orders Apodiformes, Aegotheliformes, Nyctibiiformes, Podargiformes, and Steatornithiformes were lumped alongside nightjars in the Caprimulgiformes. In 2021, the International Ornithological Congress redefined the Caprimulgiformes as only applying to nightjars, with potoos, frogmouths, oilbirds, and owlet-nightjars all being reclassified into their own orders. See Strisores for more info about the disputes over the taxonomy of Caprimulgiformes. A phylogenetic analysis found that the extinct family Archaeotrogonidae, known from the Eocene and Oligocene of Europe, are the closest known relatives of nightjars.

=== Caprimulgidae ===
Traditionally, nightjars have been divided into two subfamilies: the Caprimulginae, or typical nightjars and the Chordeilinae. The Chordeilinae included species with short bills and lack of elongated rictal bristles in the genera Nyctiprogne, Lurocalis and Chordeiles. Molecular phylogenetic studies have shown that the two subfamilies are not monophyletic. In addition, the subfamily Eurostopodinae was introduced for species in the genera Eurostopodus and Lyncornis but these two genera are now known not to be closely related.

The common poorwill, Phalaenoptilus nuttallii, is unique as a bird that undergoes a form of hibernation, becoming torpid and with a much reduced body temperature for weeks or months, although other nightjars can enter a state of torpor for shorter periods.

The cladogram shown below is based on a 2014 phylogenetic study by Snorri Sigurðsson and Joel Cracraft that analysed two mitochondrial and two nuclei loci. The African brown nightjar (Veles binotatus), was not included in the study. The division of the species into genera is based on the 2025 version of AviList taxonomy. In 2023 Thiago Vernaschi Costa and collaborators proposed that the non-monophyly could be resolved by the introduction of three monotypic genera. They resurrected the genus Antiurus for the spot-tailed nightjar and erected two new genera: Quechuavis for Tschudi's nightjar and Tepuiornis for the Roraiman nightjar.

- Caprimulgidae
  - Eurostopodus – nightjars (7 species)
  - - Lyncornis – nightjars (2 species)
    - - Gactornis – collared nightjar
      - - - Nyctiprogne – nighthawks (2 species)
          - - Lurocalis – nighthawks (2 species)
            - - - Nyctipolus – nightjars (2 species)
                - Nyctidromus – pauraque and nightjar (2 species)
              - - Tepuiornis – Roraiman nightjar
                - - Uropsalis – nightjars (2 species)
                  - - Quechuavis – Tschudi's nightjar
                    - - Setopagis – nightjars (3 species)
                      - - - Systellura – band-winged nightjar
                          - Eleothreptus – (2 species)
                        - - Antiurus – spot-tailed nightjar
                          - Hydropsalis – nightjars (4 species)
        - - - Siphonorhis – poorwills (2 species)
            - - Nyctiphrynus – poorwills (4 species)
              - - Phalaenoptilus – common poorwill
                - Antrostomus – nightjars and whip-poor-wills (12 species)
          - - Chordeiles – nighthawks (7 species)
            - Caprimulgus – nightjars (39 species)

The family contains 22 genera.

- Eurostopodus (7 species)
- Lyncornis (2 species)
- Gactornis – collared nightjar
- Lurocalis (2 species)
- Nyctiprogne (2 species)
- Nyctipolus (2 species)
- Nyctidromus (2 species)
- Tepuiornis – Roraiman nightjar
- Uropsalis (2 species)
- Setopagis (3 species)
- Systellura – band-winged nightjar
- Eleothreptus (2 species)
- Antiurus – spot-tailed nightjar
- Hydropsalis (4 species)
- Siphonorhis (2 species)
- Nyctiphrynus (4 species)
- Phalaenoptilus – common poorwill
- Antrostomus (12 species)
- Chordeiles (6 species; includes Podager, including the common nighthawk)
- Veles – brown nightjar
- Caprimulgus (39 species, including the European nightjar)

In addition, a fossil species, Ventivorus ragei has been described in 1988 from southwest France by Cécile Mourer-Chauviré based on two partial coracoids.

Also see a list of nightjars, sortable by common and binomial names.

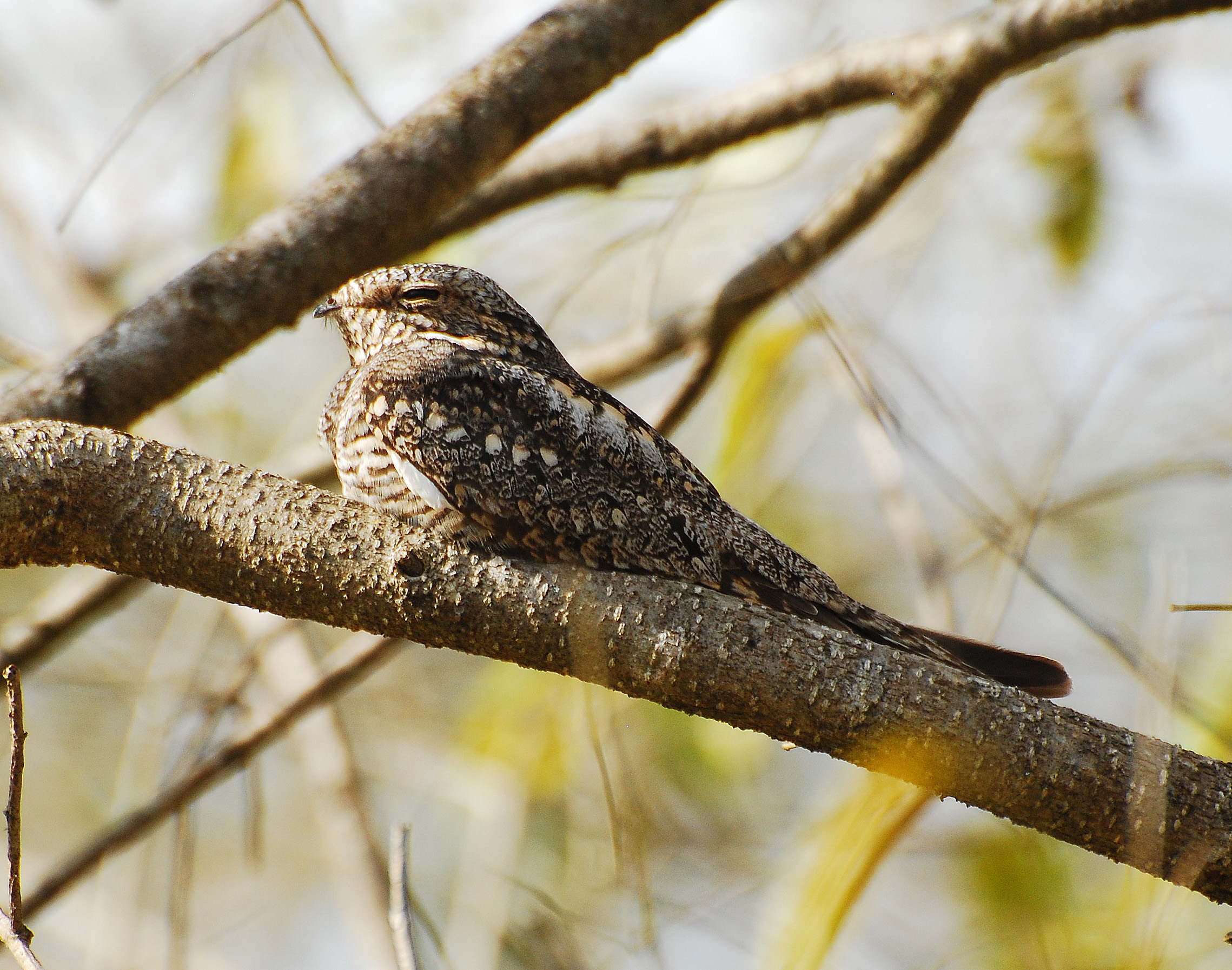
Lesser nighthawk

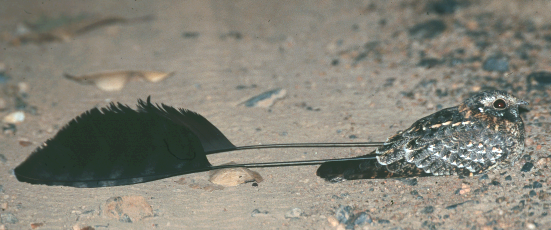
Standard-winged nightjar

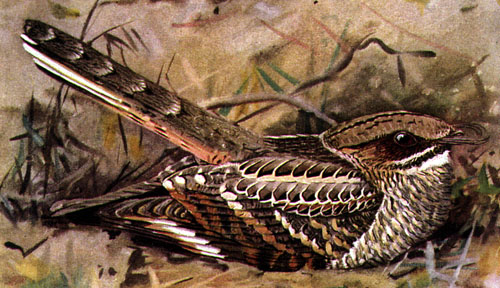
Pauraque

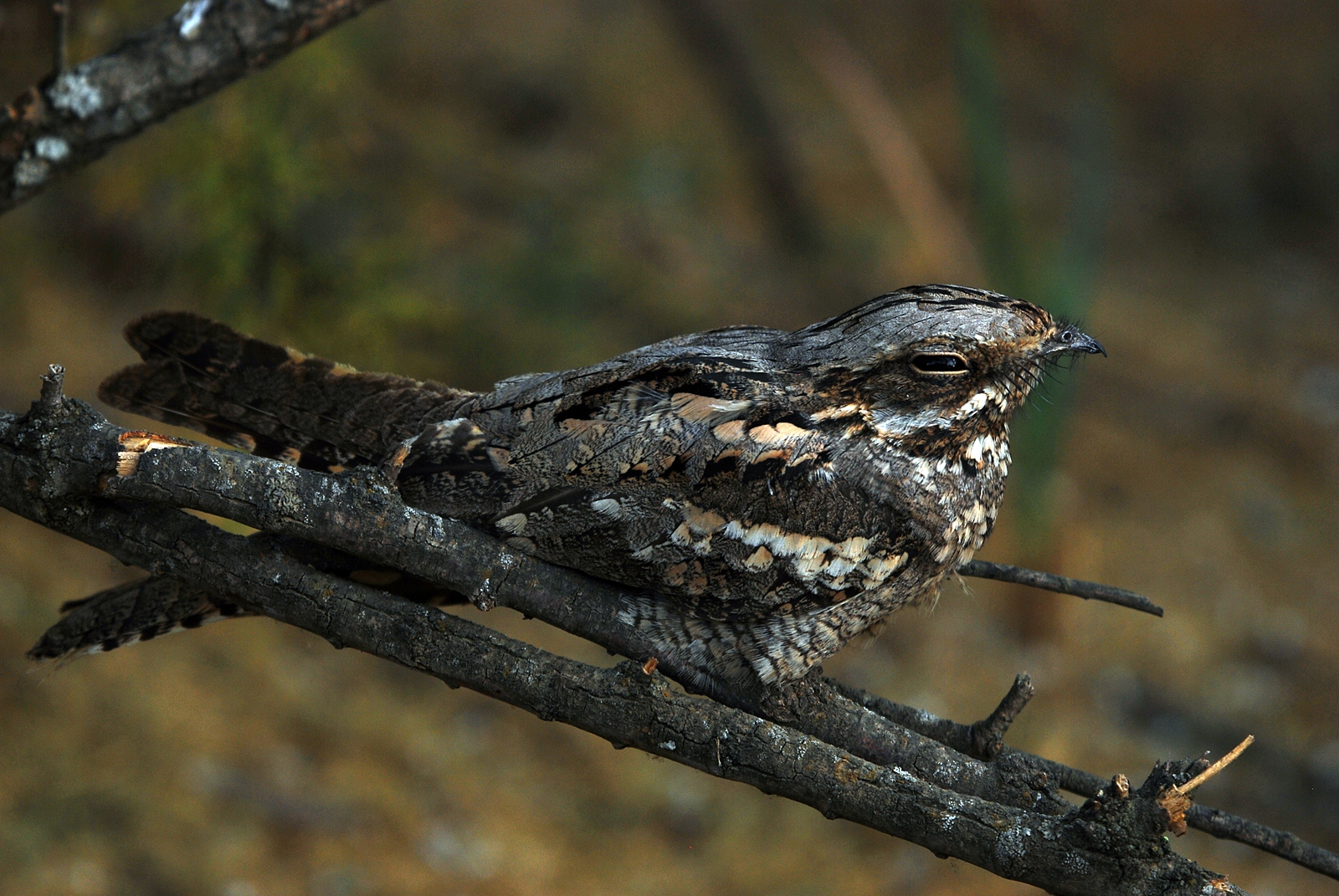
European nightjar

== Distribution and habitat ==
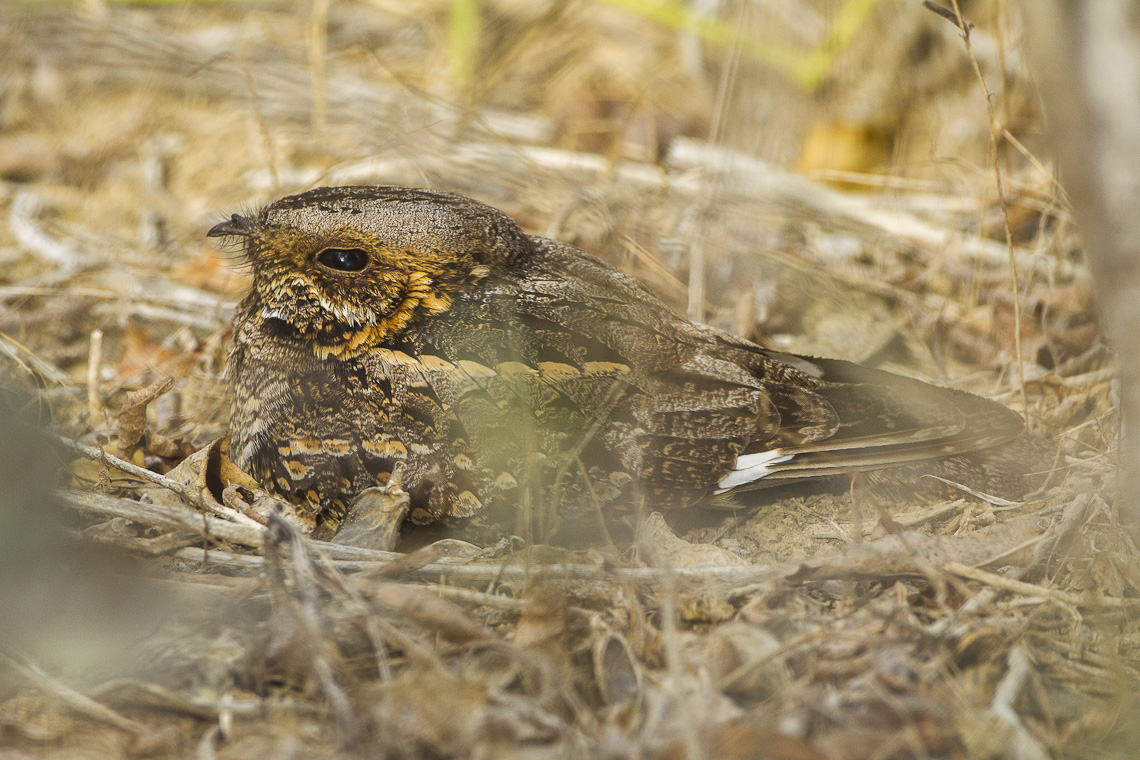
The Madagascar nightjar is restricted to the islands of Madagascar and the Seychelles.

Nightjars inhabit all continents apart from Antarctica. They are also found on some island groups such as the Seychelles and New Caledonia. They are not known to live in extremely arid desert regions. Nightjars can occupy all elevations from sea level to 4,200 m (13,800 ft), and a number of species are montane specialists. Nightjars occupy a wide range of habitats, from deserts to rainforests but are most common in open country with some vegetation. The nighthawks are confined to the New World, and the eared nightjars to Asia and Australia.

A number of species undertake migrations, although the secretive nature of the family may account for the incomplete understanding of their migratory habits. Species that live in the far north, such as the European nightjar or the common nighthawk, migrate southward with the onset of winter. Geolocators placed on European nightjars in southern England found they wintered in the south of the Democratic Republic of the Congo. Other species make shorter migrations.

== Conservation and status ==
Some species of nightjars are threatened with extinction. Roadkill is thought to be a major cause of mortality for many members of the family because of their habit of resting and roosting on roads.

They also usually nest on the ground, laying one or two patterned eggs directly onto bare ground. Nightjars possibly move their eggs and chicks from the nesting site in the event of danger by carrying them in their mouths. This suggestion has been repeated many times in ornithology books, but surveys of nightjar research have found very little evidence to support this idea.

Developing conservation strategies for some species presents a particular challenge in that scientists do not have enough data to determine whether or not a species is endangered due to the difficulty in locating, identifying, or categorizing their limited number (e.g. 10,000) known to exist, a good example being the Vaurie's nightjar in China's south-western Xinjiang Province (as seen only once in-hand). Surveys in the 1970s and 1990s failed to find the species, implying that the species has become extinct, endangered, or found only in a few small areas.

== In history and popular culture ==
- Nebraska's state nickname was once the "Bugeater State" and its people were sometimes called "bugeaters" (presumably named after the common nighthawk). The Nebraska Cornhuskers college athletic teams were also briefly known as the Bugeaters, before adopting their current name, also adopted by the state as a whole. A semi-professional soccer team in Nebraska now uses the Bugeaters moniker.
- Nightjars feature prominently in the lyrics of the Elton John/Bernie Taupin song "Come Down in Time": "While a cluster of nightjars sang some songs out of tune". Sting, in an interview about this song and about Elton John, said, "It's a very beautiful song. ... I love Bernie's lyrics ... It is one of those songs you wish you had written...."
- Cosmo Sheldrake featured their calls in his album, "Wake up Calls", which all featured calls from endangered birds. Sheldrake started the album with the Nightjar to represent the night ending.
