= Sulawesi nightjar =

Conservation status
- Least Concern (IUCN 3.1)

Scientific classification
- Kingdom: Animalia
- Phylum: Chordata
- Class: Aves
- Order: Caprimulgiformes
- Family: Caprimulgidae
- Genus: Caprimulgus
- Species: C. celebensis

Binomial name
- Caprimulgus celebensis Ogilvie-Grant, 1894

Species of bird

The Sulawesi nightjar or the Sulawesian nightjar (Caprimulgus celebensis) is a species of nightjar in the family Caprimulgidae. It is endemic to Indonesia, where it occurs on Sulawesi and the Sula Islands. Its natural habitats are subtropical or tropical moist lowland forests and subtropical or tropical mangrove forests.

== Taxonomy and systematics ==
This species was formally described from Sulawesi in 1894 by the Scottish ornithologist William Robert Ogilvie-Grant.

The genus name Caprimulgus is derived from two Latin words- capra ("nanny goat") and mulgere ("to milk") which refers to a myth that nightjars enter shepherd's stalls at night and fly to the goat's udders to milk them, causing them to go blind and perish.

The specific epithet celebensis is derived after the island of Sulawesi, where it was originally described.

Two subspecies are recognised-

- Caprimulgus celebensis celebensis Ogilvie-Grant, 1894: Sulawesi and Buton
- Caprimulgus celebensis jungei Neumann, 1939: Taliabu and Mangole

The subspecies name jungei commemorates the Dutch ornithologist George Junge.

This species is closely related to the Jerdon's nightjar, Large-tailed nightjar, Andaman nightjar and the Philippine nightjar, and all five were formerly considered conspecific, but this species differs in voice and morphology.

== Description ==
This species is a medium-sized, greyish-brown and variegated nightjar, which is about 24-30 cm in size. The sexes are similar.

The forehead, crown, mantle, back, rump and nape are greyish-brown streaked with brown. It often lacks a collar around the hindneck. There is a white patch on the throat, and the chin, breast, belly and flanks are buff barred brown. The iris is dark brown, and the bill, legs and feet are blackish.

The female is similar to the male, but the R5 and R4 tail feathers are more white in color (22 mm in the female to 19 mm in the male).

== Habits ==
The song is a series of tok or chuck notes, the latter notes are softer and trail off like a ball bouncing. The song lasts for 1.2-1.5 seconds. This species sings from branches in trees or along the edges of roads and is heard predominantly at dusk.

This species is crepuscular and nocturnal, and it roosts on leaf litter or on roads and tracks at dusk. It often flies with deep, stiff wingbeats but may also make short, flycatching flights from the ground.

The species feeds on insects by hawking after prey in agile flight. No information is available on its breeding habits.

== Habitat ==
This species inhabits secondary forest, the edges of mangroves, and coastal bush. On Taliabu, it inhabits lightly logged forests, while on Buton, it may be found on agricultural land.

== Status and distribution ==
The nominate subspecies is found on the islands of Sulawesi, Lembeh and Buton. The subspecies jungei is found on the islands of Taliabu and Mangole. This species is listed as Least Concern by the IUCN and its population trend is listed as "Decreasing".
