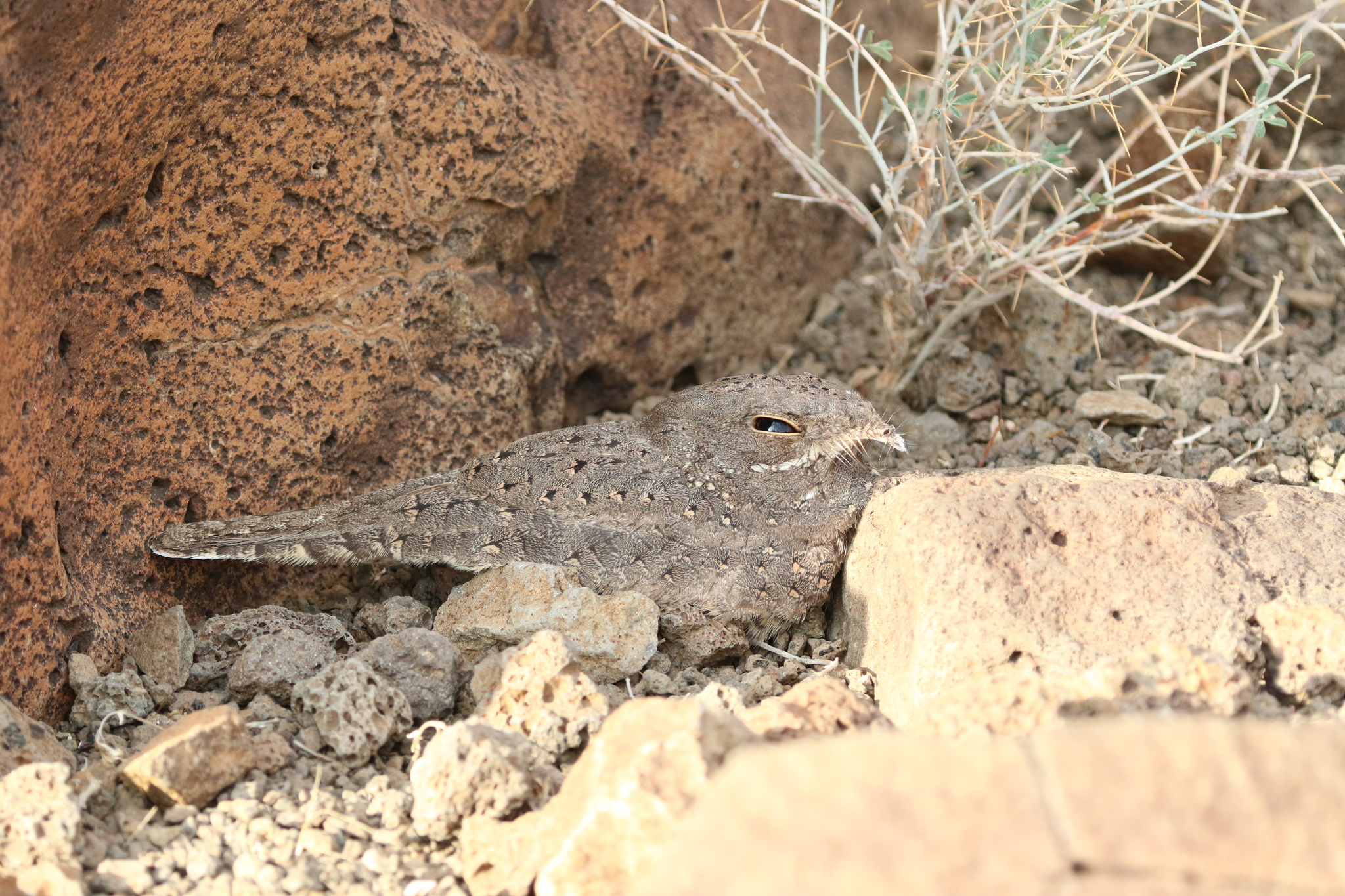

Conservation status
- Least Concern (IUCN 3.1)

Scientific classification
- Kingdom: Animalia
- Phylum: Chordata
- Class: Aves
- Clade: Strisores
- Order: Caprimulgiformes
- Family: Caprimulgidae
- Genus: Caprimulgus
- Species: C. stellatus

Binomial name
- Caprimulgus stellatus Blundell & Lovat, 1899

= Star-spotted nightjar =

Species of bird

The star-spotted nightjar (Caprimulgus stellatus) is a species of nightjar in the family Caprimulgidae. It is found in central Ethiopia, northern and northwestern Kenya and southern South Sudan.

Star-spotted nightjar tend to inhabit low-altitude and dry habitats such as the lava-strewn fields, stony or sandy semi-deserts, dwarf grassland as well as open bushland.

Star-spotted nightjar share physical similarity with Plain nightjar (Caprimulgus inornatus) as they are both small to medium sized with proportionately large heads. Except the star-spotted nightjar have distinct white patch on its throat separated by dark line and corner of its tails.
