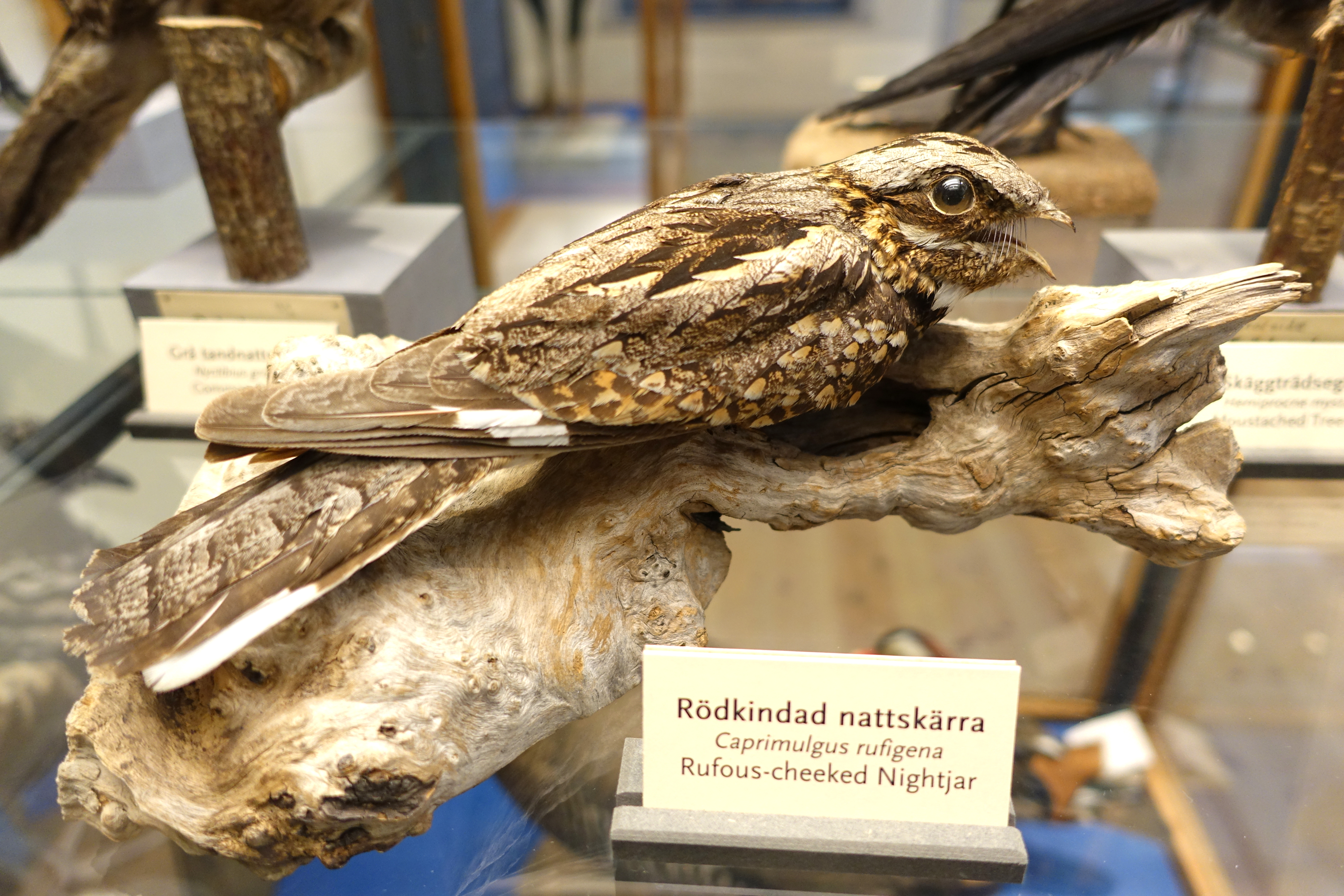
- C. rufigena specimen in the Swedish Museum of Natural History

Conservation status
- Least Concern (IUCN 3.1)

Scientific classification
- Kingdom: Animalia
- Phylum: Chordata
- Class: Aves
- Order: Caprimulgiformes
- Family: Caprimulgidae
- Genus: Caprimulgus
- Species: C. rufigena

Binomial name
- Caprimulgus rufigena Smith, 1845

= Rufous-cheeked nightjar =

Species of bird

The rufous-cheeked nightjar (Caprimulgus rufigena) is a species of nightjar in the family Caprimulgidae. It is an intra-African migrant that breeds in the south of its range. It spends the non-breeding season in eastern Nigeria, Cameroon, southern Chad and Sudan, the Republic of the Congo, the D.R.C. and western Central African Republic. Throughout the year it can be found in Southern Africa. It is a nocturnal species that feeds on flying insects, mainly hunting at dusk and the early night. They can hunt at night thanks to their large eyes that are adept at seeing in the dark. They cannot see in complete darkness and most likely cannot see colours either. The rufous-cheeked nightjar forms monogamous pairs and the egg laying period is from September to November. It looks very similar to other African nightjars and they are frequently misidentified during research and studies.

== Taxonomy ==
The rufous-cheeked nightjar is in the Caprimulgiformes order which after changes in 2021 solely contains the family Caprimulgidae.

Two subspecies are recognised:

- C. r. damarensis Strickland, 1853 – west Angola, Namibia, Botswana and northwest South Africa
- C. r. rufigena Smith, A, 1845 – southwest Zambia, Zimbabwe and central, east, south South Africa

== Description ==
Similar to that of the fiery-necked nightjar, the rufous-cheeked nightjar is 23–24 cm tall with a male weighing 48-65g and a female weighing 46-66g, and has a typical nightjar body shape. Paler than the fiery-necked nightjar, the rufous-necked nightjar has a dark brown body decorated with rufous-coloured spots and a less distinct rufous-coloured collar. Like most nightjars, it has a short, slightly curved black beak. A male has white marks on the primaries and the tail corner, while in females it is buff. Compared to the fiery-necked nightjar, the male rufous-cheeked nightjar has more white in the primaries and less in the tail, while females have less of the buff colouring. Its colours allow it to camouflage perfectly with the substrate of its preferred habitat. Juvenile down feathers give the young a disrupting counter-shading pattern which makes them even harder to locate.

== Distribution and habitat ==
The rufous-cheeked nightjar can be found in Southern Africa year-round, it can be found in Angola, Zambia, Botswana, Mozambique, Namibia, Zimbabwe, and South Africa, although it is absent from the east coast of Southern Africa, Natal, and west Namibia. Its non-breeding grounds are largely in Cameroon, but they have been found in Nigeria, D.R.C, the Republic of the Congo, southern Chad and in the Darfur region of Sudan.

It can usually be found in wooded habitats such as the miombo woodland, wooded savanna, and woodland edges and clearings. It can also be found in more open habitats such as the semi-arid acacia shrubland and semi-deserts. For breeding and nesting they prefer dryer areas and avoid rivers, lakes, valleys, as well as moist areas. They nest both within and outside wooded areas, however, when they nest outside wooded areas, they prefer bare areas often those that have been recently burned down.

== Behavior ==
=== Vocalization ===
The rufous-cheeked nightjar has two main flight calls. One is an upbeat "Q! Q! Q! Q!" and the other is a harsh "oar! oar! oar!" they are sung with slight pauses. The nightjar also has a territoriality song, it starts with preliminary coughs "Q-whoop...Q-whoop...Q-whoop" with the "Q" in the cough being a softer version of the Q! flight call. Afterwards, the nightjar starts churring at 31 and 32–37.5 notes/second, this churring lasts for several minutes and will start to slow down near the end. When another rufous-cheeked nightjar enters the territory, the churring will change to another song depending on the intruder's sex. A male will be met with oaring similar to that of the flight call, while a female will be sung a song that sounds like purring.

=== Food and feeding ===
The rufous-cheeked nightjar primarily hunts at dusk and early night but has also been seen to hunt in the moonlight and at dawn. They primarily eat beetles, but also eat moths, grasshoppers and other flying insects. Nightjars are skilled hunters and are able to fill their stomachs during the short time of dusk. Nightjars frequently leave their territory while hunting, and even travel to different habitats. It in open woodlands and waterholes where it can drink water while flying, they also hunt by roads where insects gather because they are attracted to street lights. They primarily perch low to the ground to watch their prey, and once spotted they will leap towards it, snatch it, and land back on the same spot they started. They do not solely use this tactic, they will sometimes fly and search for their prey as well. Their main way of locating prey is by using their large eyes which are well-equipped to see in the dark, however they cannot see in complete darkness.

=== Breeding ===
Rufous-cheeked nightjars are a monogamous species, both partners watch over the nest with the male watching the nest at night and the female during the day. The breeding period usually takes place from September to November. The male will find and claim a territory during the breeding season and within this territory, he will begin his territorial song which consists of churring throughout the night, letting other males know that that is his territory and inviting females. The churring is continuous and can last for several minutes, however when the moon is obstructed the churring will temporarily halt. If another male approaches his territory the rufous-cheeked nightjar will begin oaring until they are scared away, and he will begin purring if a female approaches. Once a female approaches, she will inspect his territory, and if suitable she will decide on a nesting location and they will begin breeding immediately. Since noise will attract predators, the male stops churring during breeding, and will only sing when he switches places with the female to watch over the nest.

Similar to other nightjars, the breeding habits of the rufous-cheeked nightjar seem to follow a lunar schedule, although this has yet to be confirmed. Following this cycle, the nightjars lay their eggs about one week following a full moon. Replacement clutches do not follow this cycle.

The rufous-cheeked nightjar usually lays two eggs per clutch with an incubation period of 15–17 days, however they have been seen to lay only one egg. Laying one egg is more frequently seen with replacement clutches. The eggs are glossy and are usually a pale pinkish-cream colour. The eggs are on average 27.17 x 20.09 mm and weigh on average 5.86g. Rufous-cheeked nightjars do not make nests, they simply make small grooves on the floor of their chosen spot and lay their eggs in there. The bird's plumage makes perfect camouflage, so the presence of a nest would only inform predators of their location. The main issue with such a well concealed nest is that the parents would have a hard time finding it themselves. To solve this problem, the rufous-cheeked nightjar uses quartzite blocks as landmarks to lead them to their nest.
