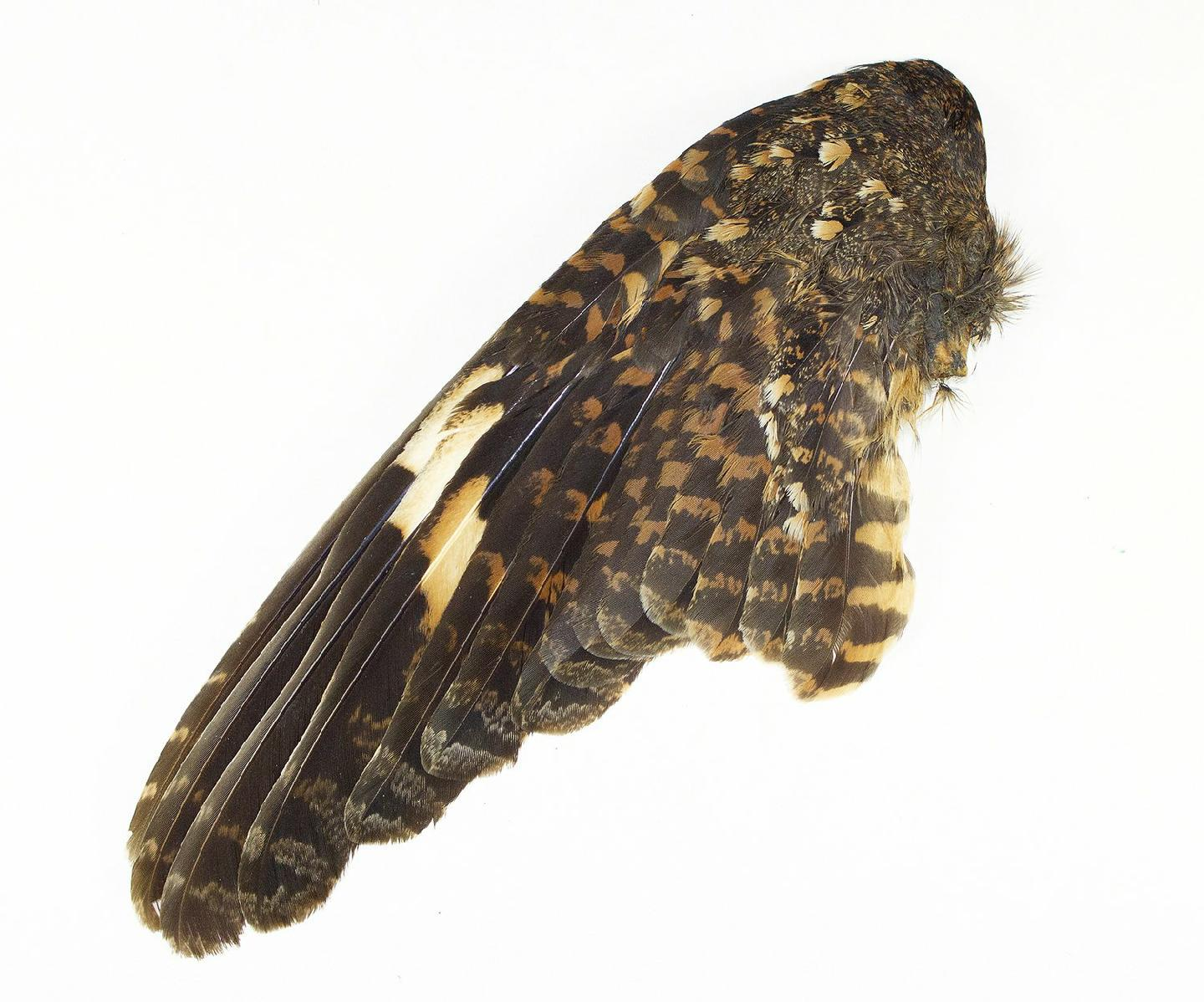
- Topside of the type specimen

Conservation status
- Vulnerable (IUCN 3.1)

Scientific classification
- Kingdom: Animalia
- Phylum: Chordata
- Class: Aves
- Clade: Strisores
- Order: Caprimulgiformes
- Family: Caprimulgidae
- Genus: Caprimulgus
- Species: C. solala

Binomial name
- Caprimulgus solala Safford, Ash, Duckworth, Telfer & Zewdie, 1995

= Nechisar nightjar =

Species of bird

The Nechisar nightjar (Caprimulgus solala) is a species of nightjar in the family Caprimulgidae. It is now thought to be a hybrid. It is endemic to Ethiopia.

The species was first discovered in 1990 when researchers discovered a decomposing specimen in the Nechisar National Park. After bringing back a single wing from the specimen to the Natural History Museum in London, it was determined to be a previously unknown species, based on a combination of its wing length and the position of a white patch on the outer primaries. Its specific name, solala, means "only a wing".

Its natural habitat is subtropical. It is probably endemic to Nechisar National Park.

In 2025, researchers taking DNA samples from the Nechisar specimen and other African nightjars concluded that the individual was likely a hybrid of a female Standard-winged Nightjar and a male Freckled Nightjar. This hybrid combination would be a first confirmed case of hybridization of Old World nightjars.
