= Palau nightjar =

Conservation status
- Least Concern (IUCN 3.1)

Scientific classification
- Kingdom: Animalia
- Phylum: Chordata
- Class: Aves
- Order: Caprimulgiformes
- Family: Caprimulgidae
- Genus: Caprimulgus
- Species: C. phalaena

Binomial name
- Caprimulgus phalaena Hartlaub & Finsch, 1872

Species of bird

The Palau nightjar (Caprimulgus phalaena) is a species of nightjar endemic to Palau. This species was formerly considered to be conspecific with the jungle nightjar and the grey nightjar. It was described by Gustav Hartlaub and Otto Finsch in 1872 and it is monotypic.

== Etymology ==
The genus name Caprimulgus is derived from the Latin capra, "nanny goat", and mulgere, "to milk", referring to an old myth that nightjars suck milk from goats.

The specific epithet phalaena is derived the Greek phalaina (φαλαινα), "moth", referring to the grey and brown plumage of this species, which resembles a moth.

== Description ==
It is a large, greyish-brown nightjar, 28-32 cm in length, and it is sexually dimorphic.

The forehead, crown and nape of this species is greyish-brown, and the mantle, back, rump and uppertail-coverts are speckled brown. There is an indistinct pale or tawny buff collar around the hindneck. There is a large-white patch in each side of the throat, and the chin, belly and flanks are buff-brown. The bill is brownish or blackish and the legs are brownish. The female is similar to the male but is often more heavily tinged rufous.

The immature is similar to the female. The juvenile is similar to the immature but paler. The chick has not been described.

== Status and distribution ==
This species is found only in four islands in Palau- Arakabesan, Babelthuap, Koror and Peleliu. It is considered as Least-concern by the IUCN, with a stable population of 1,000 to 2,499 individuals.

== Breeding ==
The breeding season has been reported to be from April to August. This species does not make a nest, rather, it lays its eggs on bare ground or on leaf litter. The clutch size is 1 to 2 eggs.

== Habits ==
Like most nightjars it is crepuscular and is frequently spotted on leaf litter on the ground or on branches. It frequently sits on roads and tracks at night. Its diet consists of moths, crickets and beetles.

It makes a call similar to that of the grey nightjar, a series of up to 14 or more loud tok tok tok, although it is delivered at a slower rate.
