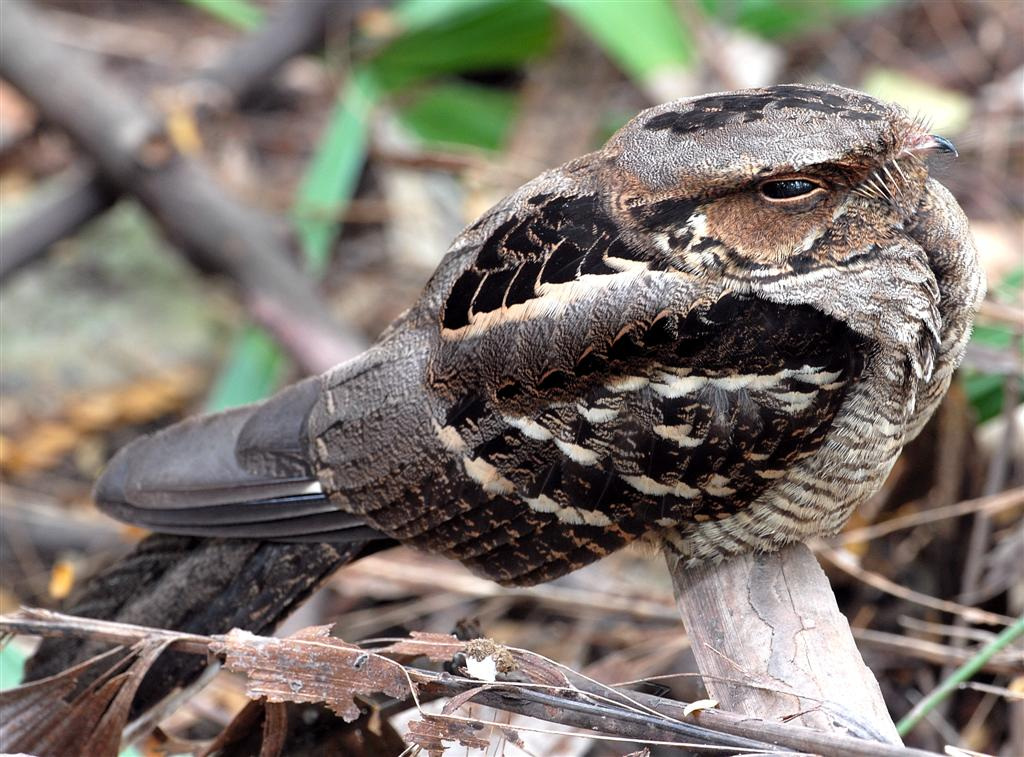
- Large-tailed nightjar (Caprimulgus macrurus)

Scientific classification
- Kingdom: Animalia
- Phylum: Chordata
- Class: Aves
- Order: Caprimulgiformes
- Family: Caprimulgidae
- Genus: Caprimulgus; Linnaeus, 1758

Type species
- Caprimulgus europaeus (European nightjar) Linnaeus, 1758

Species
- 39, see text.

Synonyms
- Stenopsis

= Caprimulgus =

Genus of birds

Caprimulgus is a large and very widespread genus of nightjars, medium-sized nocturnal birds with long pointed wings, short legs and short bills. Caprimulgus is derived from the Latin capra, "nanny goat", and mulgere, "to milk", referring to an old myth that nightjars suck milk from goats. The common name "nightjar", first recorded in 1630, refers to the nocturnal habits of the bird, the second part of the name deriving from the distinctive churring song.

Caprimulgus nightjars are found around Afro-Eurasia and Australasia, and like other nightjars they usually nest on the ground. They are mostly active in the late evening and early morning or at night, and feed predominantly on moths and other large flying insects.

Most have small feet, of little use for walking, and their soft plumage is cryptically coloured to resemble bark or leaves. Some species, unusually for birds, perch along a branch, rather than across it, which helps to conceal them during the day. Temperate species are strongly migratory, wintering in the tropics.

Caprimulgus species have relatively long bills and rictal bristles. Many have repetitive and often mechanical songs.

== Taxonomy ==
The genus Caprimulgus was introduced in 1758 by the Swedish naturalist Carl Linnaeus in the tenth edition of his Systema Naturae. The type species is the European nightjar (Caprimulgus europaeus). The name is the Latin word for a nightjar; it combines capra meaning "nanny goat" and mulgere meaning "to milk". The myth that nightjars suck milk from goats is recounted by Pliny the Elder in his Natural History: "Those called goat-suckers, which resemble a rather large blackbird, are night thieves. They enter the shepherds' stalls and fly to the goats' udders in order to suck their milk, which injures the udder and makes it perish, and the goats they have milked in this way gradually go blind."

=== Species ===
The genus contains 39 species.

Image	Scientific name	Common name	Distribution
	Caprimulgus ruficollis	Red-necked nightjar	western Mediterranean
	Caprimulgus indicus	Jungle nightjar	India and Sri Lanka
	Caprimulgus jotaka	Grey nightjar	East Asia and Himalayas; winters to Southeast Asia
-	Caprimulgus phalaena	Palau nightjar	Palau
	Caprimulgus europaeus	European nightjar	western palearctic; winters to Sub-Saharan Africa
	Caprimulgus fraenatus	Sombre nightjar	East Africa
	Caprimulgus rufigena	Rufous-cheeked nightjar	southern Africa
	Caprimulgus aegyptius	Egyptian nightjar	Morocco to Sudan and southern Kazakhstan
	Caprimulgus mahrattensis	Sykes's nightjar	Pakistan, southern Afghanistan and Iran; winters to India
	Caprimulgus nubicus	Nubian nightjar	Red Sea area and Horn of Africa
	Caprimulgus eximius	Golden nightjar	Sahel
	Caprimulgus atripennis	Jerdon's nightjar	southern India and Sri Lanka
	Caprimulgus macrurus	Large-tailed nightjar	northern Pakistan though Southeast Asia to Queensland and New Guinea
	Caprimulgus meesi	Mees's nightjar	Flores and Sumba
-	Caprimulgus ritae	Timor nightjar	eastern Lesser Sundas
	Caprimulgus andamanicus	Andaman nightjar	Andaman Islands
	Caprimulgus manillensis	Philippine nightjar	Philippines
-	Caprimulgus celebensis	Sulawesi nightjar	Sulawesi and Sula Islands
	Caprimulgus donaldsoni	Donaldson Smith's nightjar	Horn of Africa to northern Tanzania
	Caprimulgus pectoralis	Fiery-necked nightjar	Sub-Saharan Africa
	Caprimulgus poliocephalus	Montane nightjar	eastern Afromontane
	Caprimulgus asiaticus	Indian nightjar	South Asia to southern Indochina
	Caprimulgus madagascariensis	Madagascar nightjar	Seychelles and Madagascar
	Caprimulgus natalensis	Swamp nightjar	sparsely across Sub-Saharan Africa
	Caprimulgus solala	Nechisar nightjar	Nechisar Plains, Ethiopia
	Caprimulgus inornatus	Plain nightjar	northern Sub-Saharan Africa and southwestern Arabia; winters to more southern latitudes
	Caprimulgus stellatus	Star-spotted nightjar	Ethiopia, northern Kenya and southern South Sudan
	Caprimulgus affinis	Savanna nightjar	Indomalaya
	Caprimulgus griseatus	Chirruping nightjar	Philippines
	Caprimulgus tristigma	Freckled nightjar	Sub-Saharan Africa
-	Caprimulgus concretus	Bonaparte's nightjar	Sumatra and Borneo
-	Caprimulgus pulchellus	Salvadori's nightjar	montane Sumatra and Java
-	Caprimulgus prigoginei	Prigogine's nightjar	Itombwe Mountains
	Caprimulgus batesi	Bates's nightjar	Congo Basin
	Caprimulgus climacurus	Long-tailed nightjar	northern Sub-Saharan Africa
	Caprimulgus clarus	Slender-tailed nightjar	East Africa
	Caprimulgus fossii	Square-tailed nightjar	miombo and adjacent areas
-	Caprimulgus longipennis	Standard-winged nightjar	forested areas of northern Sub-Saharan Africa
	Caprimulgus vexillarius	Pennant-winged nightjar	miombo; winters in equatorial latitudes
