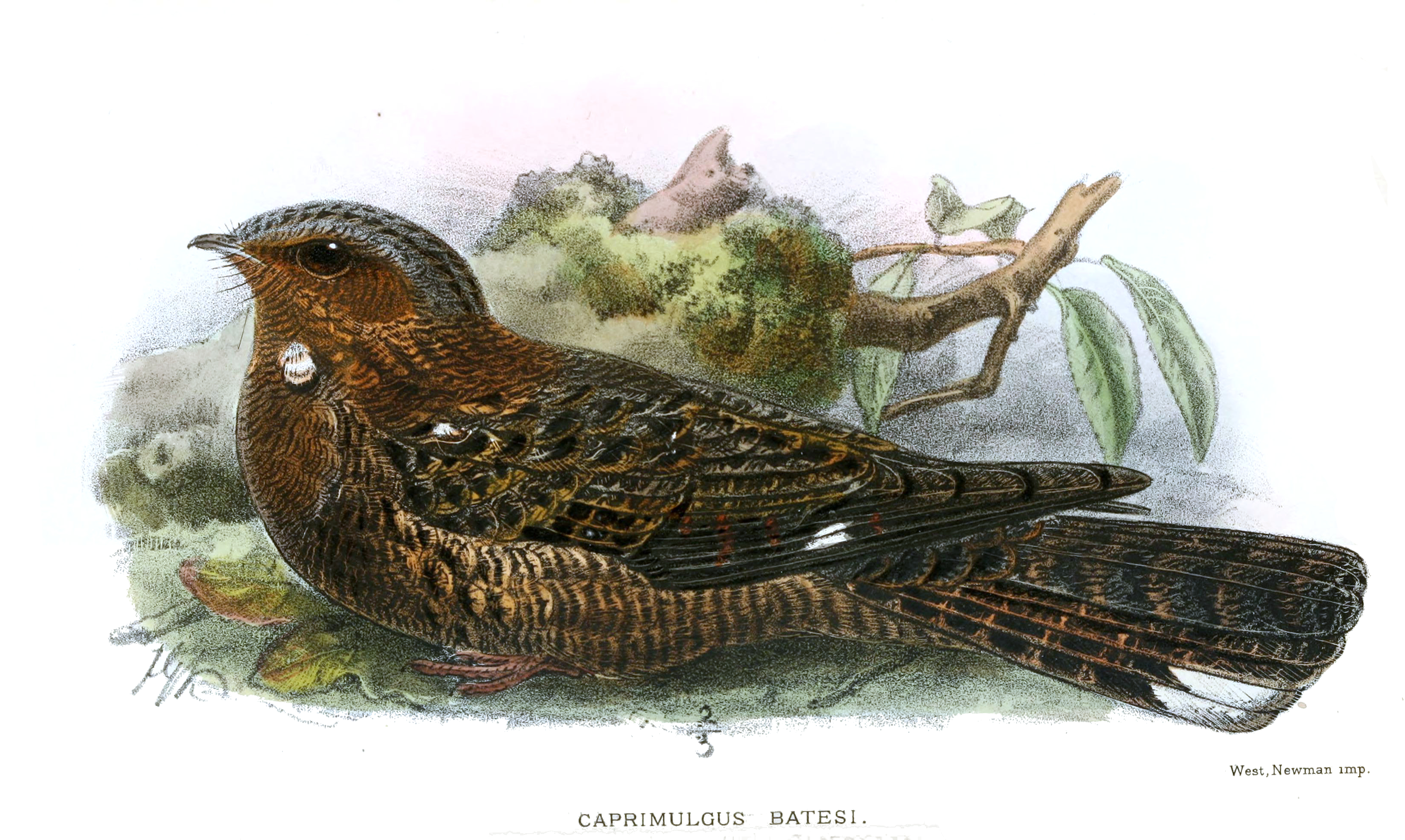

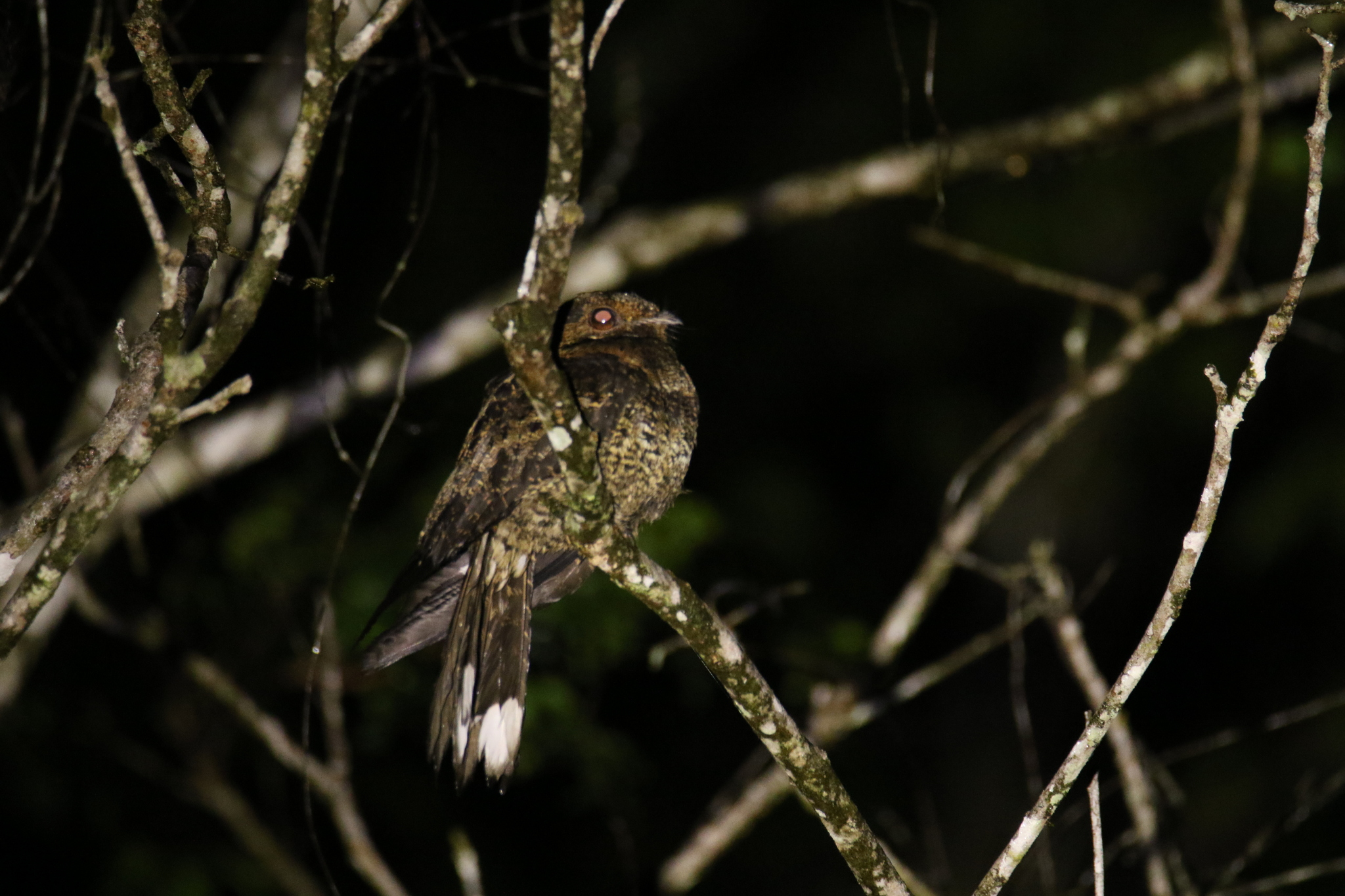

Conservation status
- Least Concern (IUCN 3.1)

Scientific classification
- Kingdom: Animalia
- Phylum: Chordata
- Class: Aves
- Order: Caprimulgiformes
- Family: Caprimulgidae
- Genus: Caprimulgus
- Species: C. batesi

Binomial name
- Caprimulgus batesi Sharpe, 1906

= Bates's nightjar =

Species of bird

Bates's nightjar (Caprimulgus batesi) or the forest nightjar, is a bird species of the family Caprimulgidae, native to the Congolian rainforests.

== Description ==
Bates's nightjar is a large, dark nightjar. At rest looks large headed and long tailed. The upperparts and wing coverts are dark brown marked with black and buff streaks and spots, with a normally indistinct buff collar on the hindneck which may be more obvious on some individuals. The underparts are blackish brown with buff speckling on the breast, becoming barred on the belly, the throat is whitish. In flight the male shows a small white spot towards the wingtip and white tips to the two outer tail feathers. The female is paler and lack white spots on the wings or outer tail. They measure 29–31 cm in length and weigh 89–112g.

=== Voice ===
The song of Bates's nightjar is a loud "whow whowwhowwhowwhow" in which following the first note there is a pause then a repeated series of notes.

== Distribution ==
Bates's nightjar has a fragmented distribution, one population is found in southern Cameroon, another in western Cameroon, Gabon, southern Central African Republic and western Congo, a third slightly separate in the western Congo, with another in eastern Congo and north-western Democratic Republic of the Congo, a fifth population ranges across the Democratic Republic of the Congo and into eastern Uganda in the Bwamba Forest while the last population is in the central Democratic Republic of the Congo.

== Habitat ==
Bates's nightjar occurs mainly in lowland primary rainforest where it prefers clearings and forest edges and can be common near water, especially near rivers or flooded forest. It can also be found in secondary forest and plantations close to the edge of primary rainforest.

== Behaviour ==
Like most nightjars, Bates's nightjar is crepuscular and nocturnal. It roosts on the ground, in clearings or on paths, or several metres up perched on a liana. Forages for prey such as mantises, crickets, grasshopper, beetles and moths over and within the forest canopy, over clearings and along the edges of riverine forest. It does not build a nest and the single egg is laid directly onto the bare ground or among the leaf litter, nest site are sometimes on paths or trails. The breeding season is December to January in Gabon and potentially all tear in Democratic Republic of Congo.
