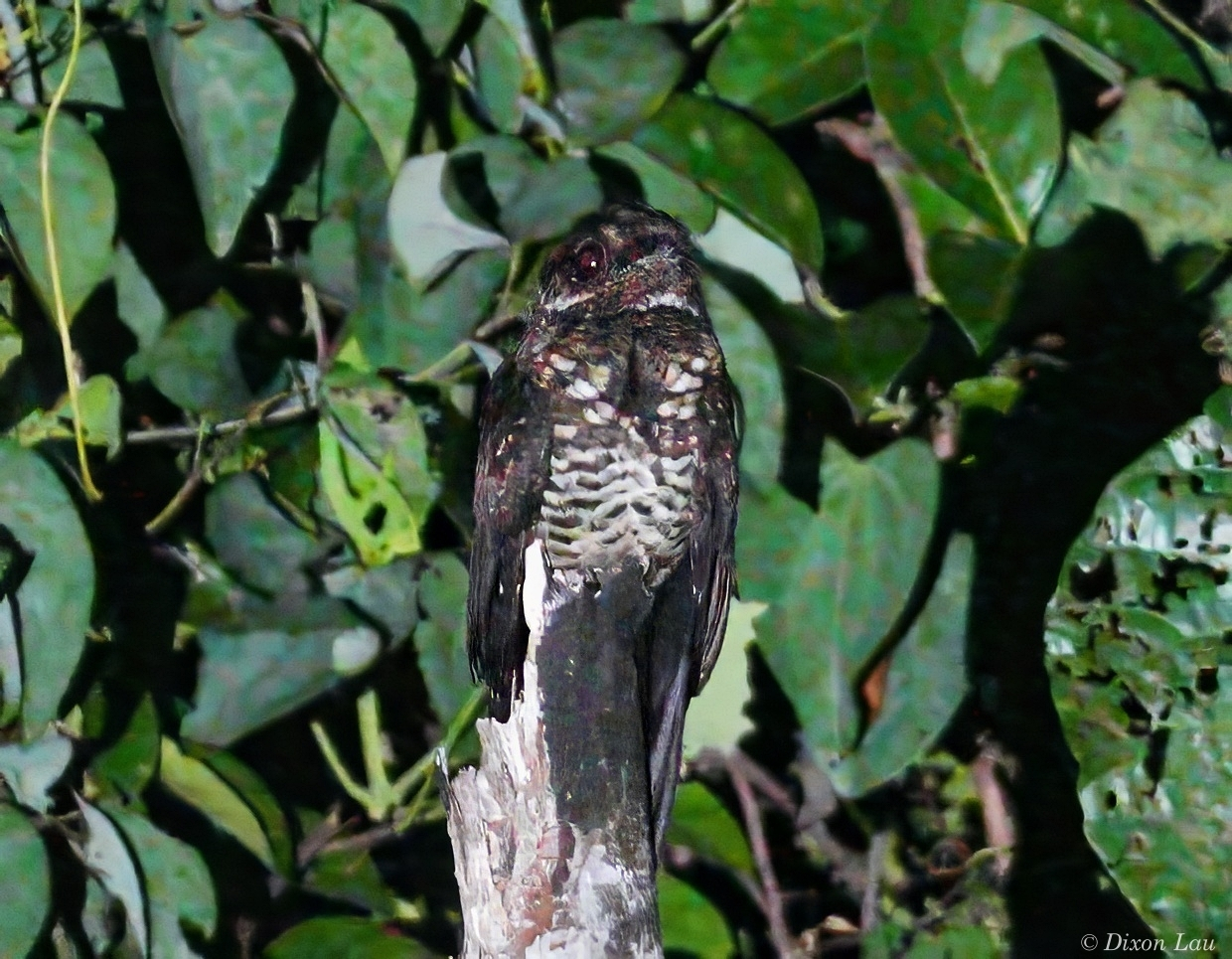

Conservation status
- Vulnerable (IUCN 3.1)

Scientific classification
- Kingdom: Animalia
- Phylum: Chordata
- Class: Aves
- Clade: Strisores
- Order: Caprimulgiformes
- Family: Caprimulgidae
- Genus: Caprimulgus
- Species: C. concretus

Binomial name
- Caprimulgus concretus Bonaparte, 1850

= Bonaparte's nightjar =

Species of bird

Bonaparte's nightjar (Caprimulgus concretus), also known as the Sunda nightjar, is a species of nightjar in the family Caprimulgidae. It is native to the islands of Sumatra, Belitung and Borneo. Its natural habitat is subtropical or tropical moist lowland forests. It is threatened by habitat loss.
