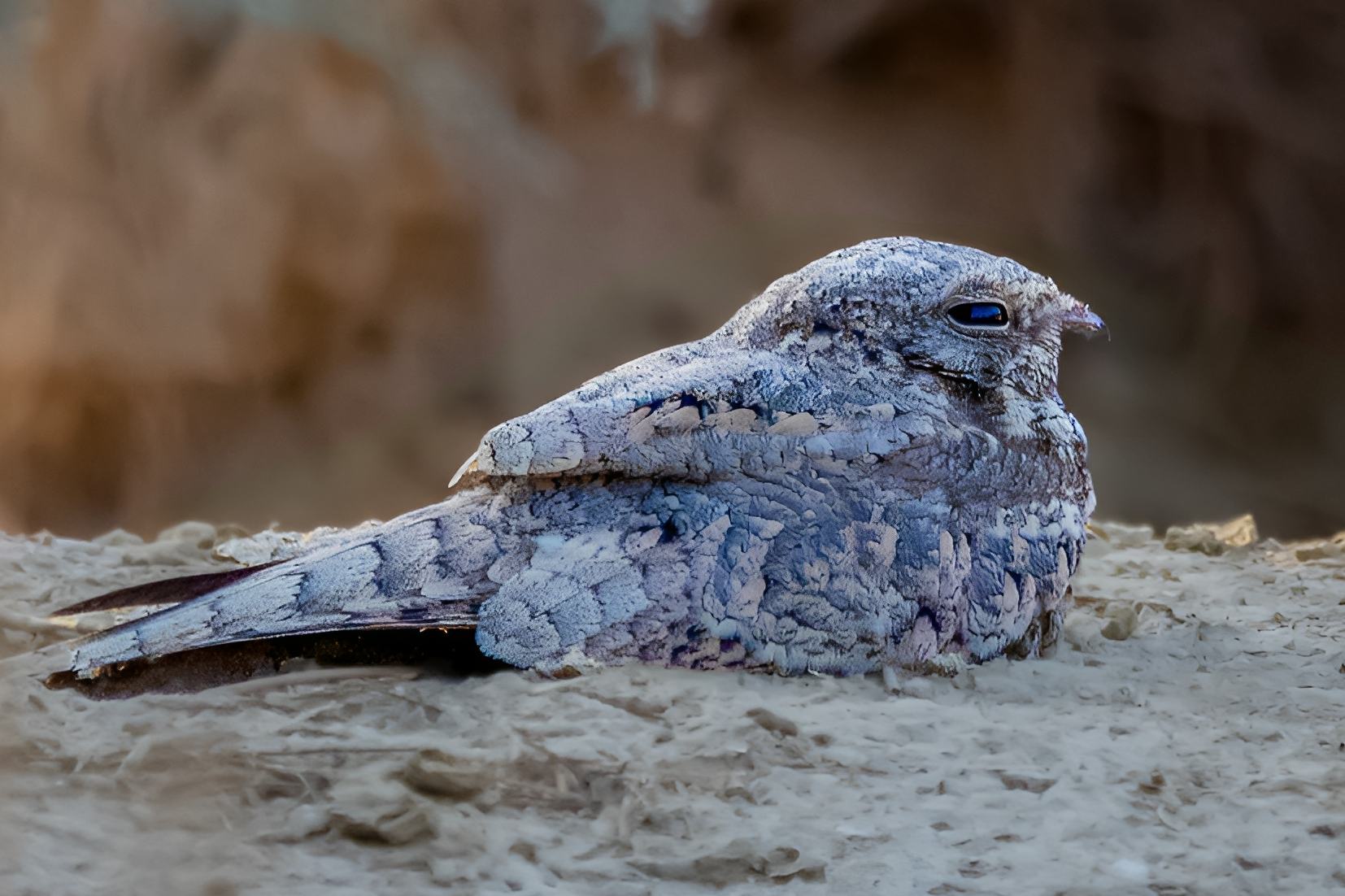

Conservation status
- Least Concern (IUCN 3.1)

Scientific classification
- Kingdom: Animalia
- Phylum: Chordata
- Class: Aves
- Order: Caprimulgiformes
- Family: Caprimulgidae
- Genus: Caprimulgus
- Species: C. aegyptius

Binomial name
- Caprimulgus aegyptius Lichtenstein, MHC, 1823

= Egyptian nightjar =

Species of bird

The Egyptian nightjar (Caprimulgus aegyptius) is a medium-small nightjar which occurs in south west Asia and north Africa and winters in tropical Africa. This is a fairly common species with a wide distribution which faces no obvious threats apart from habitat destruction, so the International Union for Conservation of Nature has rated its conservation status as being of "least concern".

== Etymology ==
The genus name Caprimulgus is derived from the Latin capra, "nanny goat", and mulgere, "to milk", referring to an old myth that nightjars suck milk from goats. The specific aegyptius is Latin for Egyptian.". The common name "nightjar", first recorded in 1630, refers to the nocturnal habits of the bird, the second part of the name deriving from the distinctive churring song.

== Description ==
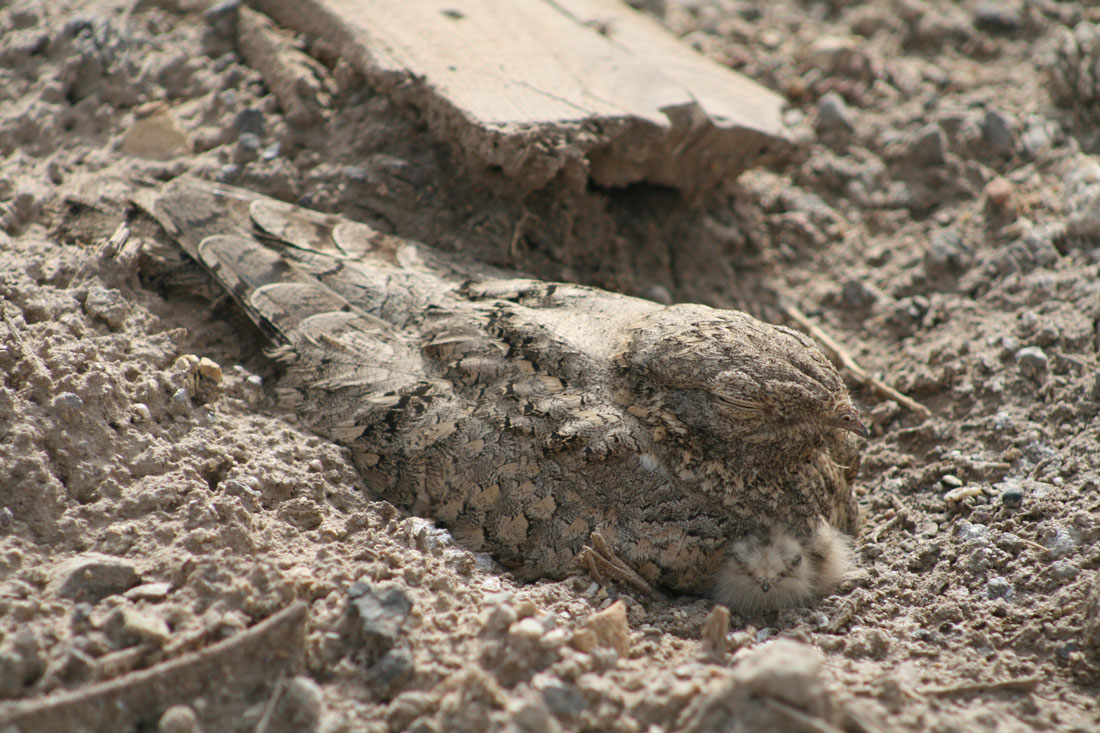
Resting during the day with chick

The variegated plumage is much paler than the European nightjar. The adult is sand-coloured, barred and streaked with buff and brown. The under parts are sandy or whitish. It is smaller, but relatively longer-winged and longer-tailed than the more widespread species. Like other nightjars, it has a wide gape, long wings, soft downy plumage and nocturnal habits. The male has tiny white wing spots. The length is 25 cm, and the wingspan 55 cm. Its call is a repetitive mechanical kroo-kroo-kroo…, which rises and falls as the bird turns its head from side to side.

== Distribution and habitat ==
The Egyptian nightjar is native to northern Africa, the Arabian Peninsula and the Middle East. Its range includes Afghanistan, Algeria, Bahrain, Chad, Egypt, Iran, Iraq, Israel, Jordan, Kazakhstan, Kuwait, Libya, Mali, Mauritania, Morocco, Nigeria, Oman, Pakistan, Saudi Arabia, Senegal, South Sudan, Sudan, Tajikistan, Tunisia, Turkmenistan, United Arab Emirates, Uzbekistan and Yemen. It is a rare visitor to Europe, and has occurred as a vagrant in Denmark, Germany, Italy, Malta, Sweden and the United Kingdom. Its typical habitat is open desert with a few scattered trees or bushes. It is often found near water in areas with sparse vegetation and scrub. Overwintering birds in Sudan can be found in areas with long grass.

== Ecology ==
During the day, this crepuscular nightjar lies silent upon the ground, concealed by its plumage; it is difficult to detect, blending in with the sandy soil. It flies at dusk, most often at sundown, with an easy, silent moth-like flight; its strong and deliberate wingbeats alternate with sweeps and glides with motionless wings. Crepuscular insects, such as moths, are its food. No nest is made; the two elongated and elliptical eggs are placed upon the bare ground; the brooding bird, sitting closely, is their best protection. The population in northwestern Africa breeds in the desert and sandy steppe where there are areas with limestone outcrops, and overwinter in dry countryside with Artemisia, Tamarix and Salsola.

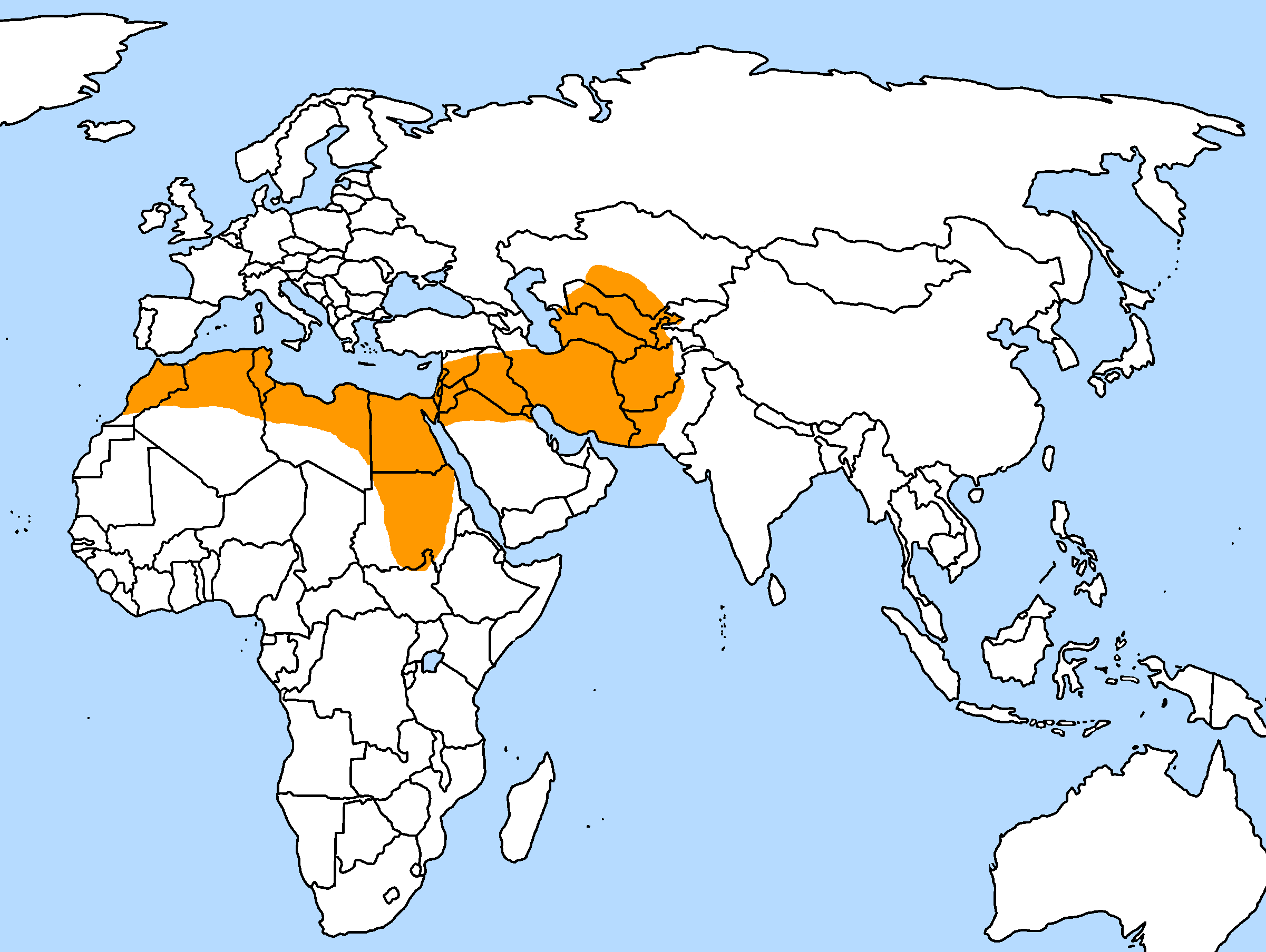
