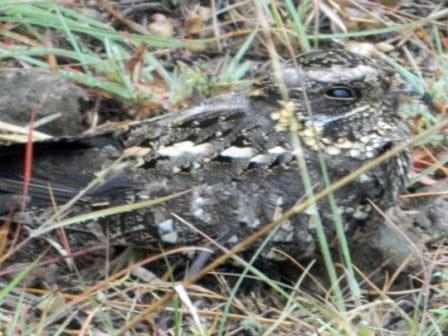
- at Gilgil, Kenya

Conservation status
- Least Concern (IUCN 3.1)

Scientific classification
- Kingdom: Animalia
- Phylum: Chordata
- Class: Aves
- Order: Caprimulgiformes
- Family: Caprimulgidae
- Genus: Caprimulgus
- Species: C. fraenatus

Binomial name
- Caprimulgus fraenatus Salvadori, 1884

= Sombre nightjar =

Species of bird

The sombre nightjar or dusky nightjar (Caprimulgus fraenatus) is a species of nightjar in the family Caprimulgidae. It is native to East Africa.

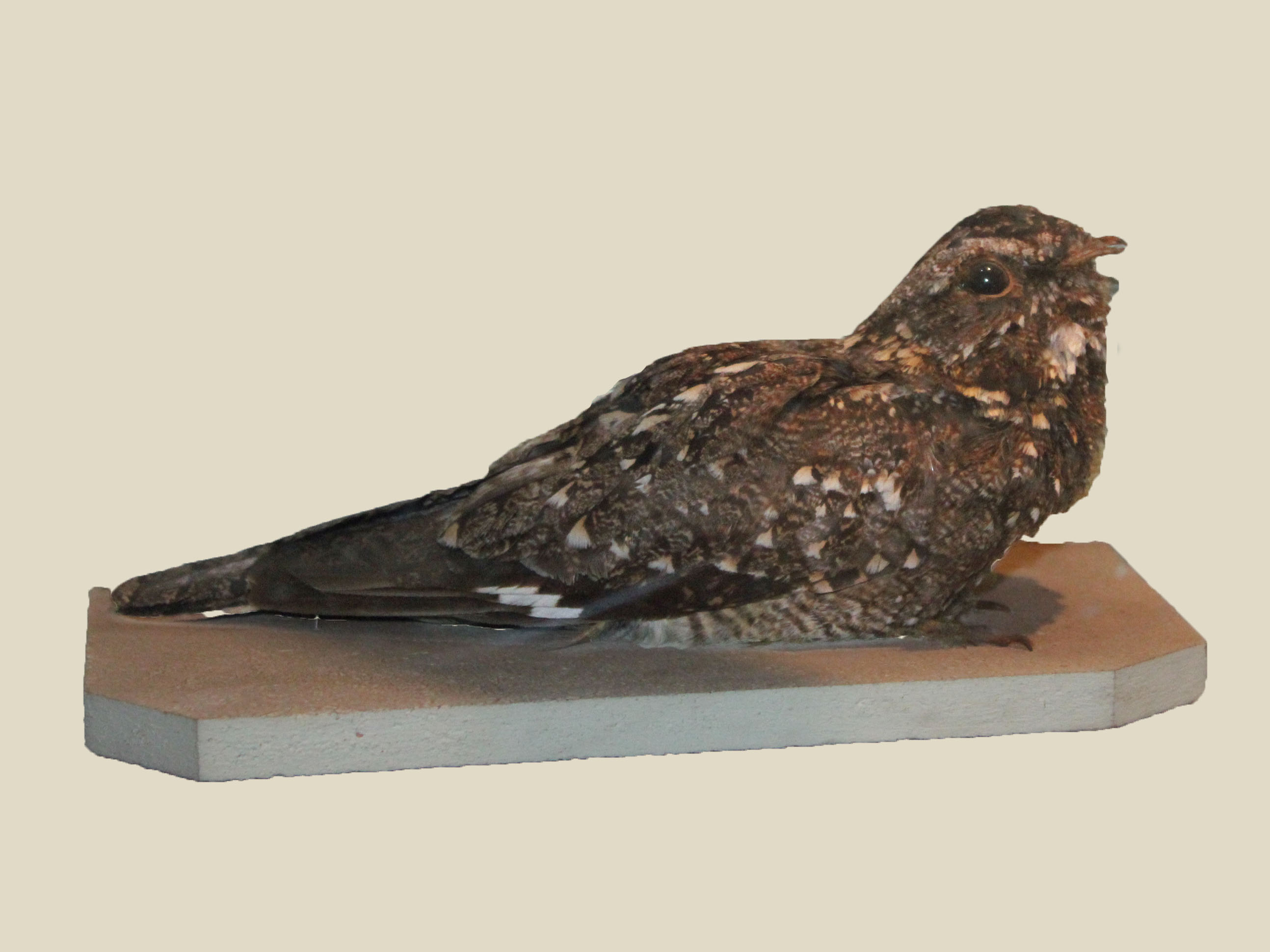
Specimen at Nairobi National Museum
