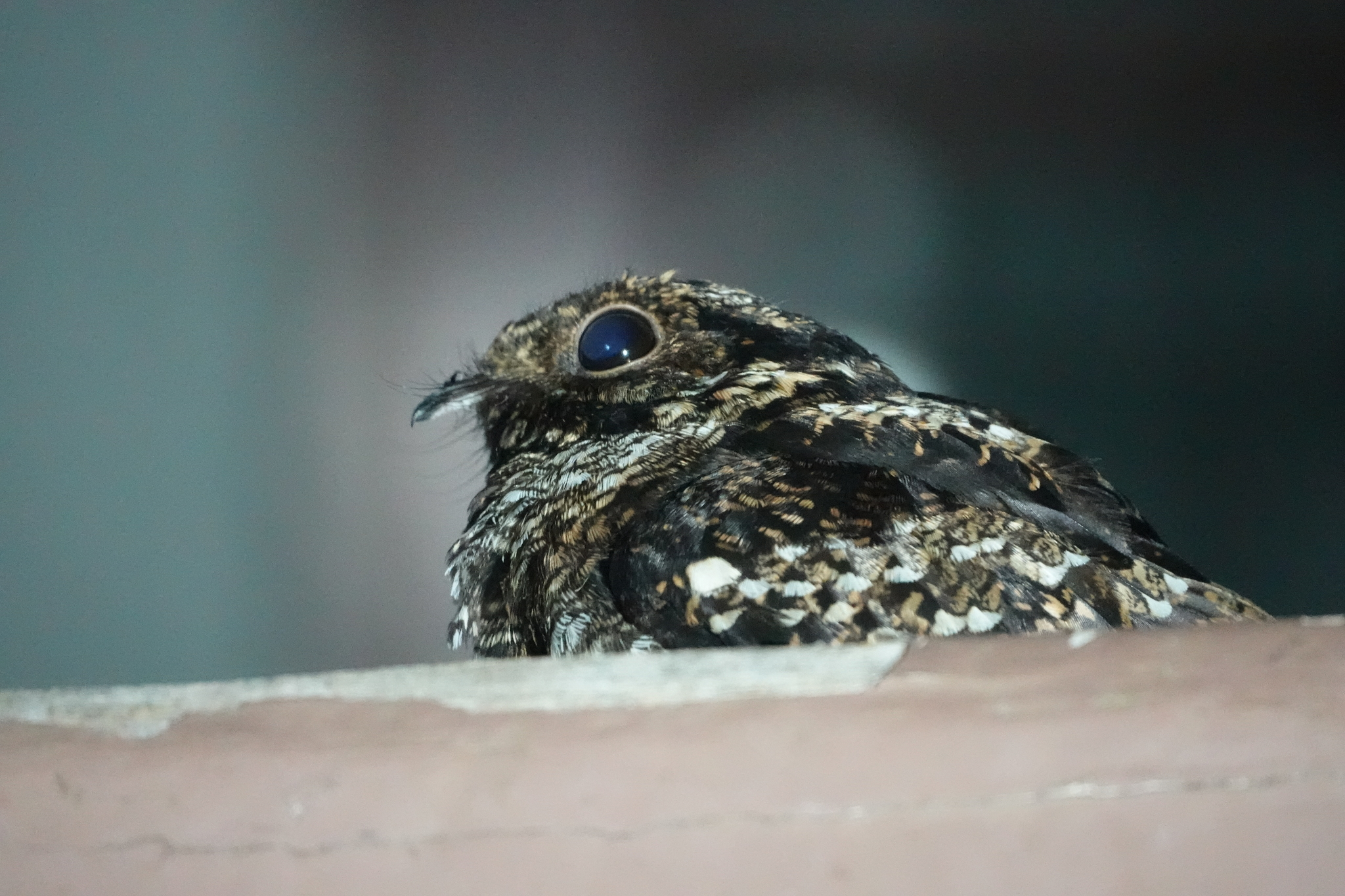

Conservation status
- Least Concern (IUCN 3.1)

Scientific classification
- Kingdom: Animalia
- Phylum: Chordata
- Class: Aves
- Order: Caprimulgiformes
- Family: Caprimulgidae
- Genus: Caprimulgus
- Species: C. pulchellus

Binomial name
- Caprimulgus pulchellus Salvadori, 1879

= Salvadori's nightjar =

Species of bird

Salvadori's nightjar (Caprimulgus pulchellus) is a species of nightjar in the family Caprimulgidae. It is endemic to Indonesia, where it is found in Sumatra and Java.

Its natural habitats are subtropical or tropical moist lowland forests and subtropical or tropical moist montane forests. It is threatened by habitat loss.
