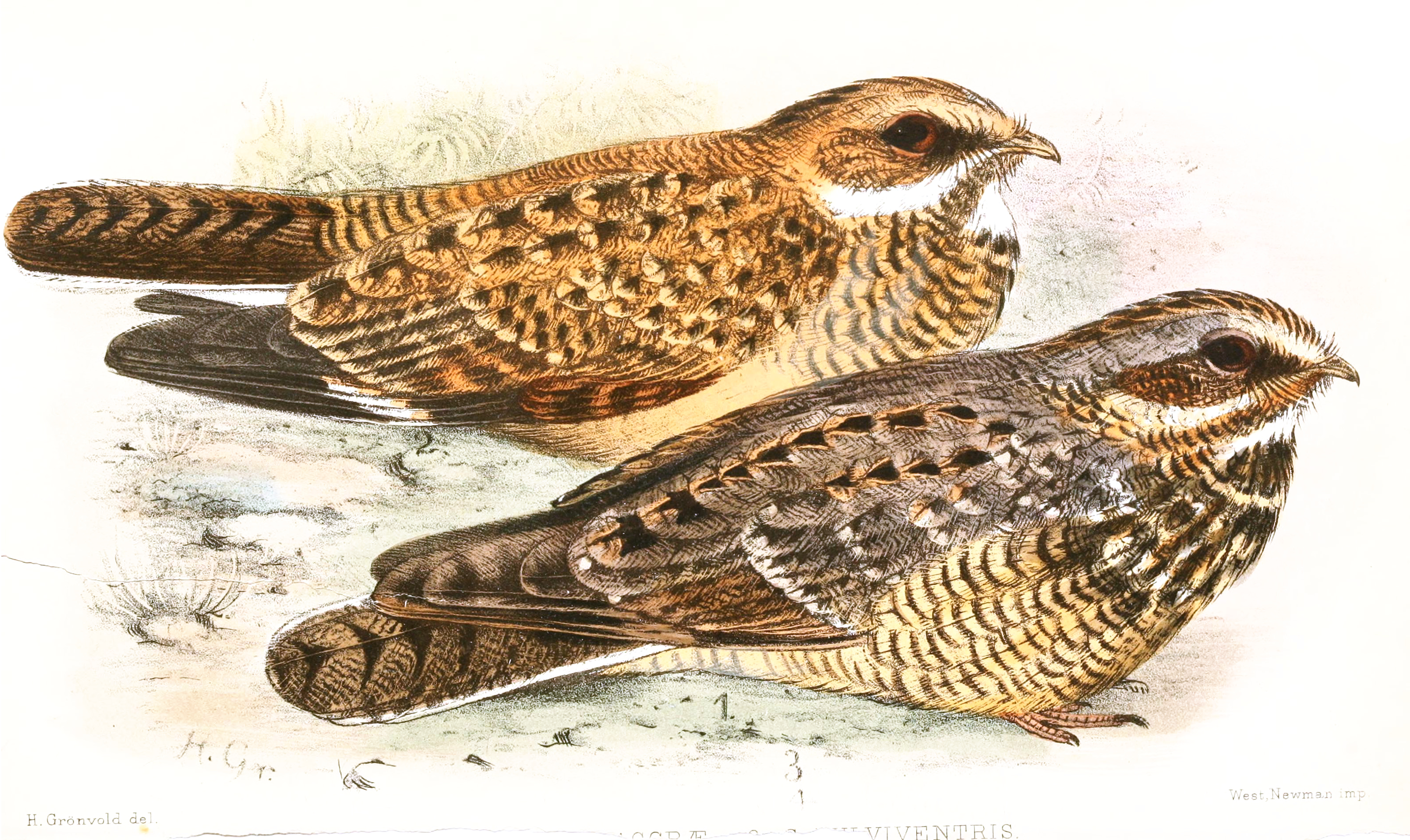
- Caprimulgus natalensis accrae
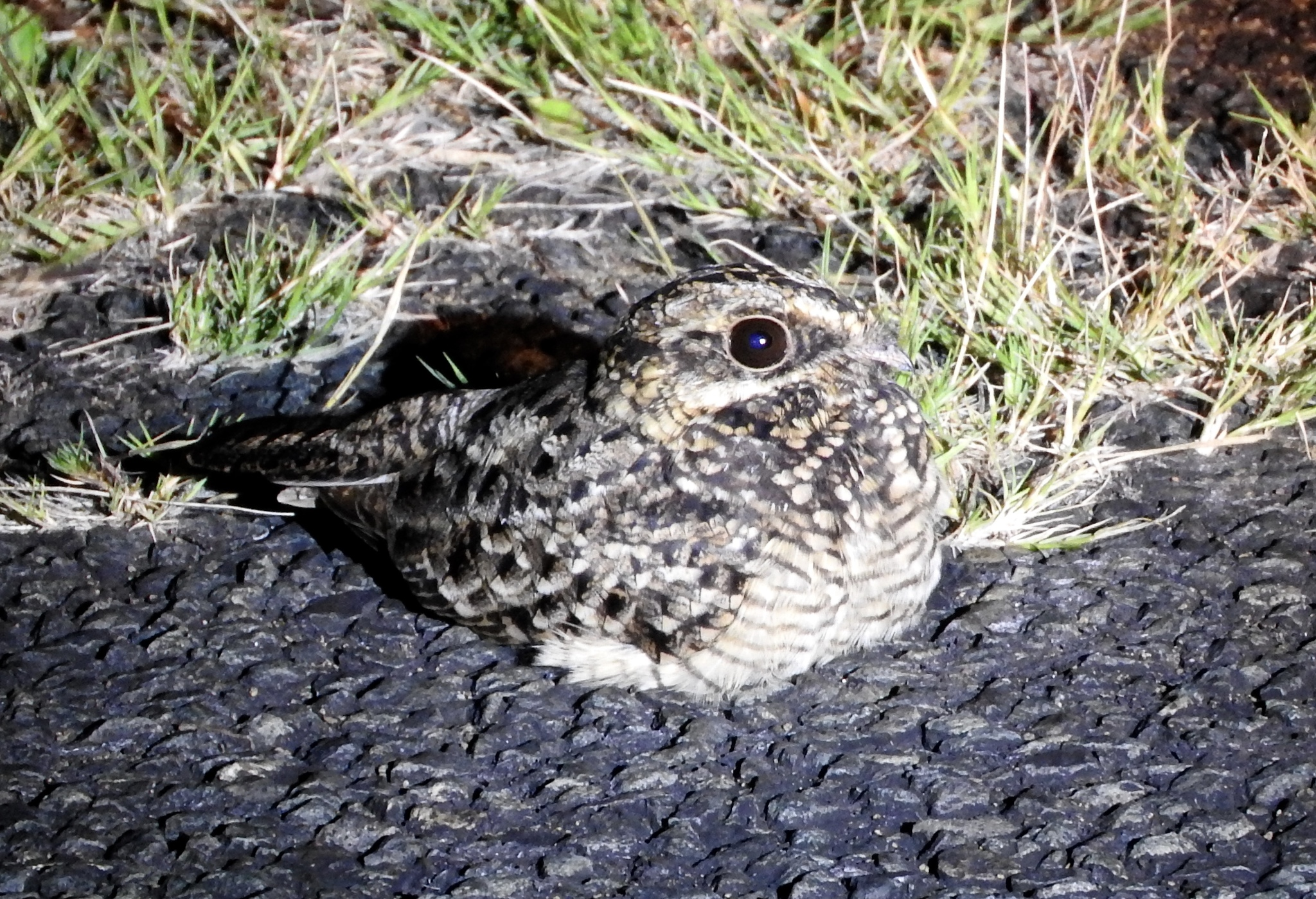

Conservation status
- Least Concern (IUCN 3.1)

Scientific classification
- Kingdom: Animalia
- Phylum: Chordata
- Class: Aves
- Order: Caprimulgiformes
- Family: Caprimulgidae
- Genus: Caprimulgus
- Species: C. natalensis

Binomial name
- Caprimulgus natalensis Smith, 1845

= Swamp nightjar =

Species of bird in the nightjar family

The swamp nightjar or Natal nightjar (Caprimulgus natalensis) is a crepuscular and nocturnal bird in the nightjar family found in Africa.

== Distribution and habitat ==
It is sparsely present across sub-Saharan Africa, albeit moreso in DR Congo and nearby countries.

The swamp nightjar can be found in swamps, marshes and bogs, but also in forest edges.
