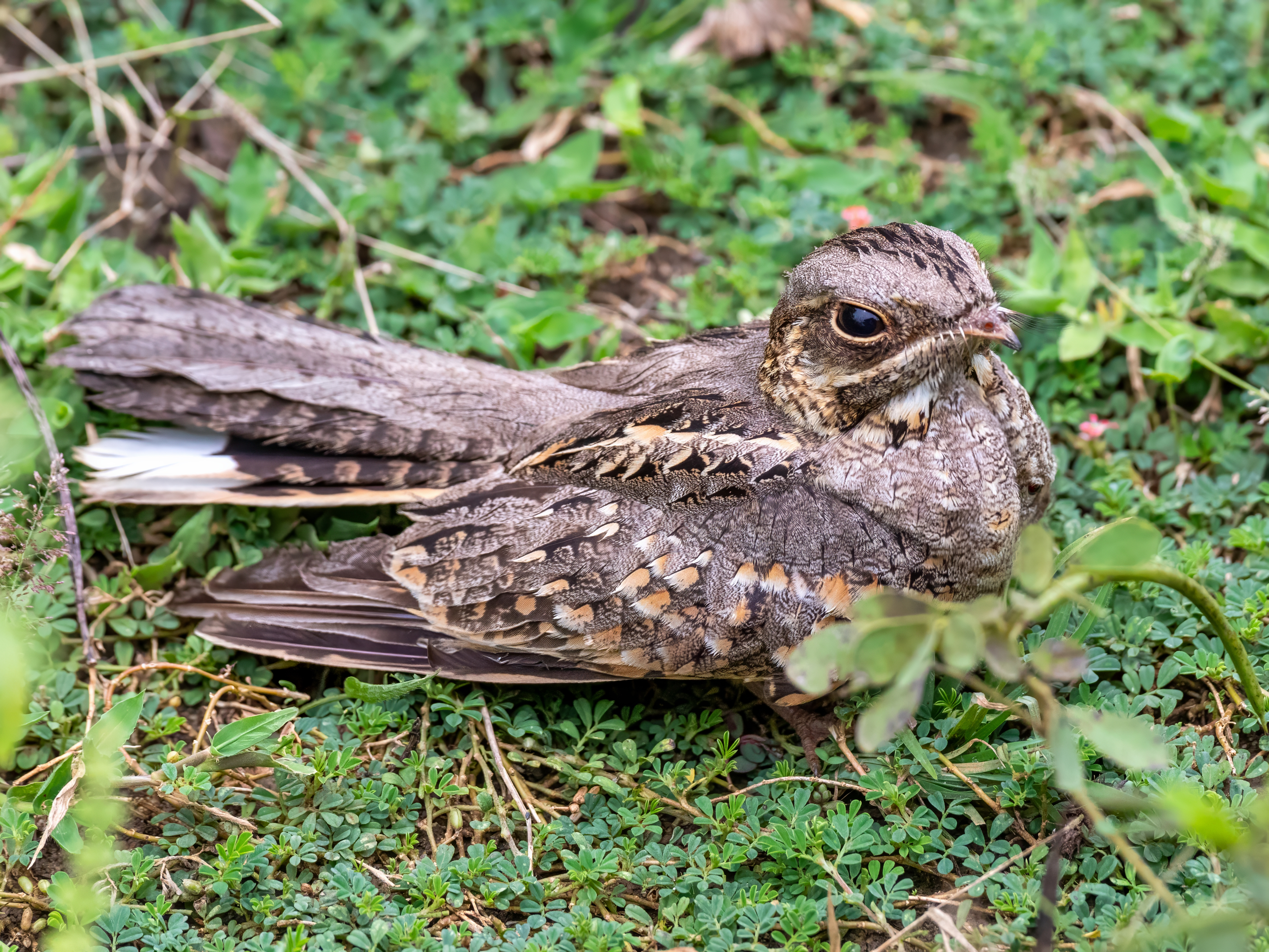

Conservation status
- Least Concern (IUCN 3.1)

Scientific classification
- Kingdom: Animalia
- Phylum: Chordata
- Class: Aves
- Clade: Strisores
- Order: Caprimulgiformes
- Family: Caprimulgidae
- Genus: Caprimulgus
- Species: C. asiaticus

Binomial name
- Caprimulgus asiaticus Latham, 1790

= Indian nightjar =

Species of bird

The Indian nightjar (Caprimulgus asiaticus) is a small nightjar which is a resident breeder in open lands across South Asia and Southeast Asia. Like most nightjars it is crepuscular and is best detected from its characteristic calls at dawn and dusk that have been likened to a stone skipping on a frozen lake - a series of clicks that become shorter and more rapid. They are sometimes spotted on roads when their eyes gleam red in the spotlight of a vehicle. There is considerable plumage variation across its range and can be hard to differentiate from other nightjars in the region especially in the field.

== Description ==
Call
Call of Indian nightjar

This nightjar is small and short-tailed with white corners to the tail, a golden nape and collar, dark cheeks and white patches on the sides of the throat. The crown is grey and the breast is finely barred in brown. The males have more white on the tail while the female is more heavily streaked on the crown. It is differentiated from Sykes's nightjar by the dark undertail and from Jerdon's nightjar by the shorter tail and white patches on the sides of the throat.

The call is distinctive and has been likened to a stone skipped on a frozen lake (due to which it was also called the "ice-bird" in colonial India) or a ping-pong ball bouncing rapidly and coming to rest.

It flies after sundown with an easy, silent moth-like flight. During the day, Indian nightjar lies still on the ground, concealed by its plumage; it is then difficult to detect, blending in with the soil.

== Taxonomy and systematics ==
The populations show clinal variation with paler plumage in the dry zone of northwestern India. The population of Sri Lanka is named eidos and is darker and greyer overall. In northwestern India, subspecies gurgaoni is very pale sandy buff with nominate populations of peninsular India showing considerable variation.

== Habitat and distribution ==
The species is found in open woodland, scrub, and cultivation. It usually sits on the ground or low trees and is not found on high perches.

The species is found from northwestern India and adjoining parts of Pakistan but not found in the arid desert region. It is found south of the Himalayas in the low elevations east to Bangladesh, Myanmar and Vietnam. It is also found in Sri Lanka.

No nest is made; the two beautifully marbled creamy pink eggs are placed upon the bare ground during February to September; the brooding bird, sitting closely, is well camouflaged. Eggs may be moved short distances. The newly hatched chick is covered in down with brown above and light rufous below. The eye is open on hatching and the chick can sit upright and make a weak sound.

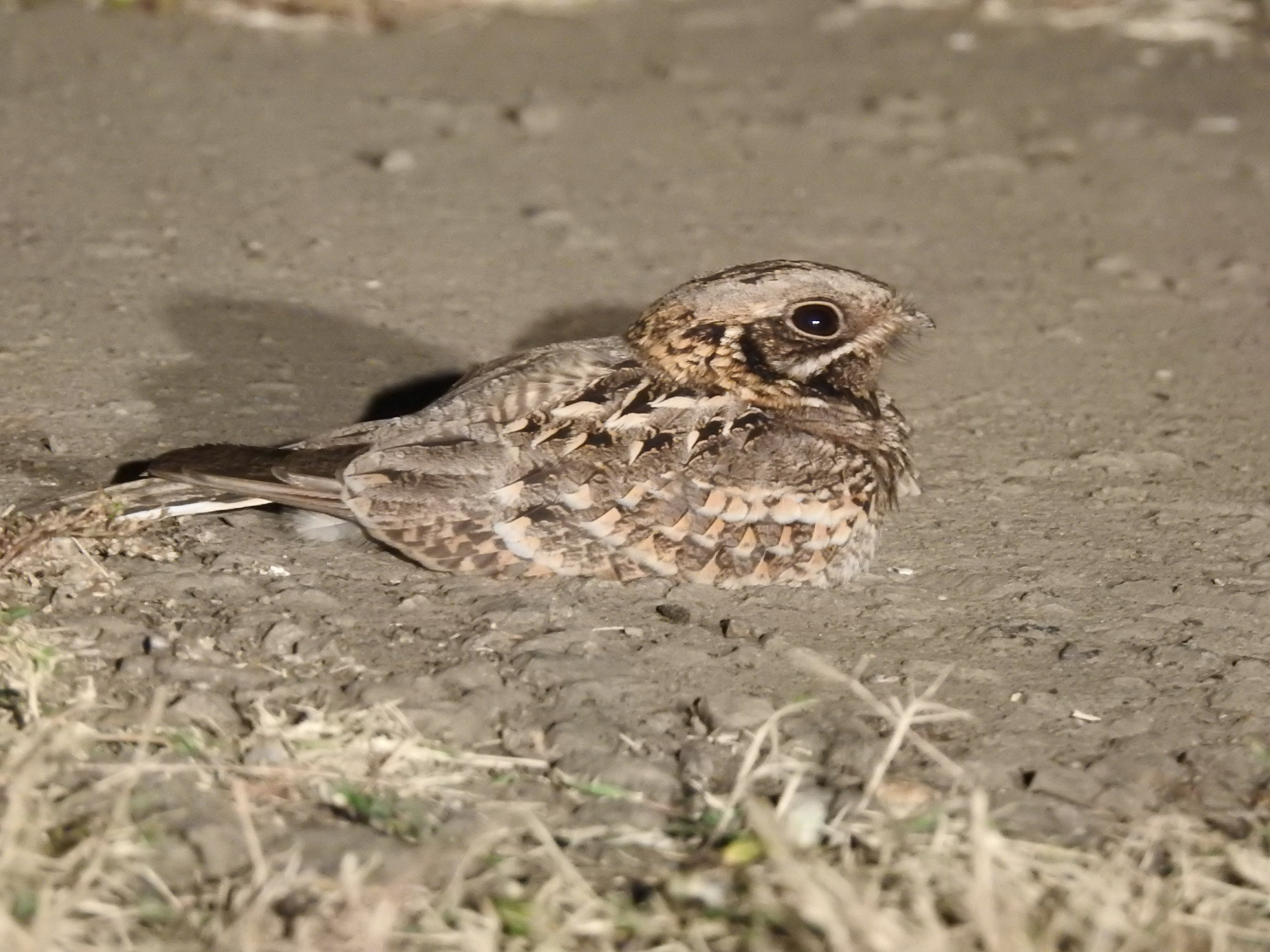
Indian nightjar clicked in Bhadravathi, Karnataka, India

== Feeding ==
Nightjars are most active, and mostly feed, near dawn and dusk (crepuscular - active during the twilight). At dusk, they often fly around livestock to feed on insects swarming around the animals. At night, they like to take advantage of insects swarming around street lamps or other artificial light sources. They are keeping their bills wide open as they fly through clouds of small insects. Nightjars may also forage under the canopy by flying from favored perches catching insects at foliage heights of 5 – 15 feet (~1.5 – 5 m). Larger insects are usually taken back to their favored feeding perches. While holding the insects in their bills, nightjars keep the head upright, shake and swallow the prey whole, or they may break the insects apart before eating. Insects may also be taken from the ground or foliage. Juvenile nightjars typically sit on the ground before making short jumps or flights to capture insects. The bulk of their diet consists of flying / swarming insects, such as mosquitoes, flies, beetles, locusts, winged ants, moths and grasshoppers, as well as plant lice and crickets. To a lesser extent, they will also eat larvae, nymphs and eggs.

This common species frequently rests on roads during the night, sometimes capturing insects under street lights. Their bright reflective eye-shine makes them easy to spot in the beams of vehicle headlights. They may however be stunned by bright lights and many are killed by vehicular traffic.
