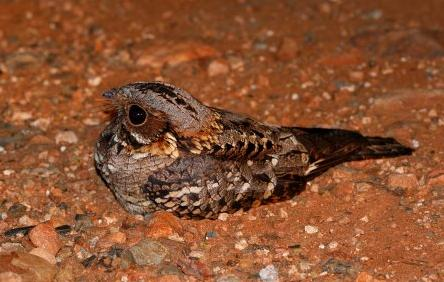
- C. p. fervidus in Limpopo, South Africa Song

Conservation status
- Least Concern (IUCN 3.1)

Scientific classification
- Kingdom: Animalia
- Phylum: Chordata
- Class: Aves
- Clade: Strisores
- Order: Caprimulgiformes
- Family: Caprimulgidae
- Genus: Caprimulgus
- Species: C. pectoralis

Binomial name
- Caprimulgus pectoralis Cuvier, 1816

= Fiery-necked nightjar =

Species of bird

The fiery-necked nightjar (Caprimulgus pectoralis) is a species of nightjar in the family Caprimulgidae, which is found mostly in Africa south of the equator, though it has been spotted in a few countries north of the equator. It is most often found in woodland savannas or other deciduous woodlands. It is usually distinguished by its tawny coloured collar which gives the species its common name. It has a distinctive call that many have rendered as 'good-lord-deliver-us'. The fiery-necked nightjar is an insectivorous species that mostly eats butterflies, moths and other insects. The fiery-necked nightjar breeds after the dry season and typically produce two clutches with two eggs per clutch.

== Taxonomy ==
The fiery-necked nightjar belongs to the family Caprimulgidae which includes roughly 90 species of nightjars, nighthawks and their relatives. These birds are all insectivorous and most active at dawn, dusk and over night. In addition, a distinguishing feature of this family is the pectinate claw, which these birds use for preening. The fiery-necked nightjar is part of the Caprimulgus genus which contains the majority of the nightjar species. The fiery-necked nightjar is most closely related to Caprimulgus poliocephalus or the Montane nightjar.

Five subspecies are recognised:

- C. p. nigriscapularis Reichenow, 1893 – Senegal and Gambia to west Kenya and southwest DR Congo
- C. p. shelleyi Barboza du Bocage, 1878 – Angola and south DR Congo to southeast Kenya, central Tanzania and north Malawi
- C. p. fervidus Sharpe, 1875 – south Angola and north Namibia to Zimbabwe and north South Africa
- C. p. crepusculans Clancey, 1994 – southeast Zimbabwe and Mozambique to east South Africa
- C. p. pectoralis Cuvier, 1816 – south South Africa

== Description ==
An adult fiery-necked nightjar is relatively small measuring between 23 and 25 centimeters. Their plumage is mostly a variegated grayish-brown and brownish-white colour. The fiery-necked nightjar has a distinct rufous collar, which are tawny coloured feathers located at the back of the neck, giving the species its common name. They have a large white throat patch. The feathers around their eyes and at their shoulders are chestnut brown. They have a light colored crown at the top of their head with a darker spot at the center. Black spots run down on either side the scapulas. Their under feathers are brown, speckled and barred brownish white. Their tail is roughly square-shaped. The fiery-necked nightjar's beak is darkly coloured and its eyes are entirely black. This species is also sexually dimorphic. The male has white spots on the four outermost wing feathers (the primaries) and white tips on the two outermost tail feathers. These white spots are much smaller and a bit more buff-coloured on the female.

The fiery-necked nightjar have long rictal bristles (or stiff hair-like feathers) around their beak which is usually a distinguishing feature in nightjars. These rictal bristles can grow up to 20 mm long and the fiery-necked nightjar can have up to 8 of them on either side of their face. The rictal bristles take 18 days to grow on newly born chicks. They are pale ivory colored at the base and darker at the tips. The ones above the beak curl upwards to protect the bird's eyes, while the ones below curl downwards to aid the bird in catching prey. The fiery-necked nightjars also have a pectinate claw on their middle toe, each with 9 bristles, allowing the bird to comb themselves during preening.

Fiery-necked nightjar chicks are semi-precocial meaning they are more or less mature and mobile right after they hatch. As a result, they are born with a bit of plumage. It consists of gray down with dark brown stripes that go from the bill, through the eyes, across the wings and the dorsal tracts which join at the preen gland. They also have russet coloured plumes on their face and wings. In addition, the chicks have fuzzy light-coloured plumes on the crown of their head. Newborn chicks measure roughly 5 cm and weigh about 5 grams.

== Distribution and habitat ==
The fiery-necked nightjar is widely distributed across most of south-eastern Africa, namely South Sudan, Kenya, central Tanzania, Congo and the Democratic Republic of Congo, Angola, Namibia, Botswana and South Africa. It has also been seen in some central and west African countries like Gambia, Senegal, western Sierra Leone, Nigeria, and Cameroon.

The fiery-necked nightjar always stays within the African continent. It will only migrate back to the same breeding location every year for breeding season, but it never strays too far from its homerange.

It is a terrestrial bird species. It is usually found in forests, savannas, shrublands and grasslands. It is most common to encounter this nightjar species in Brachystegia dominated woodland savannas but also in other deciduous woodlands in southern Africa. It can also be found in scrublands with acacia and eucalyptus plantations and sometimes in suburban gardens surrounded by trees.

== Behaviour ==
=== Vocalization ===
The fiery-necked nightjar is best known for its very distinctive song. It consists of a series of mellow notes that many say sounds like "Good Lord, deliver us deliver us deliver us". This song is often preceded by a wind-up call. However, they can sometimes sing this wind-up call for a very long period and never switch to the full song. The fiery-necked nightjar's song is usually only heard at dusk and dawn to attract mates before their breeding season. They become much less vocal during the breeding season in order to attract less attention to their breeding grounds. Any singing heard during breeding season is often produced by a fiery-necked nightjar that has yet to find a mate. They can be observed singing from various perches, like trees, fence posts, and elephant grass, and are occasionally found singing from the ground.

The fiery-necked nightjar often uses the "chuck" call as an alarm to inform other fiery-necked nightjars of possible danger. The "chuck" call is also used when foraging.

The "wooting" call is used by adult fiery-necked nightjars to help direct chicks away from danger. When they hear this call, the chicks, as young as a couple of days old, will immediately scurry towards the sound.

The chicks produce quick "wee-you" calls at 1 second intervals. As they grow, their calls become louder and have a longer duration. In addition, researchers have noticed that this call can also be heard when the chicks are still in the egg.

=== Food and feeding ===
The fiery-necked nightjar is an insectivore, meaning it feeds on mostly insects. Species from almost every insect family have been recorded to be in their diet, however, there are certain insects they tend to prefer. In fact, butterflies, moths, beetles, cockroaches, termites and mantids were found most often when the fiery-necked nightjar diet was analyzed. To forage for these insects, the fiery-necked nightjar uses a technique called "hawking". This consists of the bird swooping off of a perch to catch an insect while in flight.

When feeding their hatchlings, the parents only feed them when the chick grasps the parents beak.

=== Breeding ===
Other species of nightjar usually breed during springtime before the dry season. However, the fiery-necked nightjar will breed after the dry season. They will usually produce two clutches within a breeding season between the months of August and October.

The fiery-necked nightjar nests are typically on a bare sand patch that the bird surrounds with leaf litter. They often choose a well-hidden location under trees. The eggs laid are a salmon pinkish colour with a few brown spots. There are usually 2 eggs per clutch. The female nightjar will sit on the eggs during the day and the male will take over in the late afternoon or early evening around 6 PM. The incubation period is roughly 18 days. The chicks are semi-precocial meaning they are almost completely independent as soon as they have hatched.

The fiery-necked nightjar is most likely monogamous. In other words, the fiery-necked nightjar will mate for life and show strong fidelity to its mate. Nonetheless, the female will often leave the male's territory when it is not breeding season.

== Status and conservation ==
The fiery-necked nightjar is listed as of Least Concern on the IUCN Red List. This was last assessed in 2016. It received this status due to its stable population and very broad distribution range.
