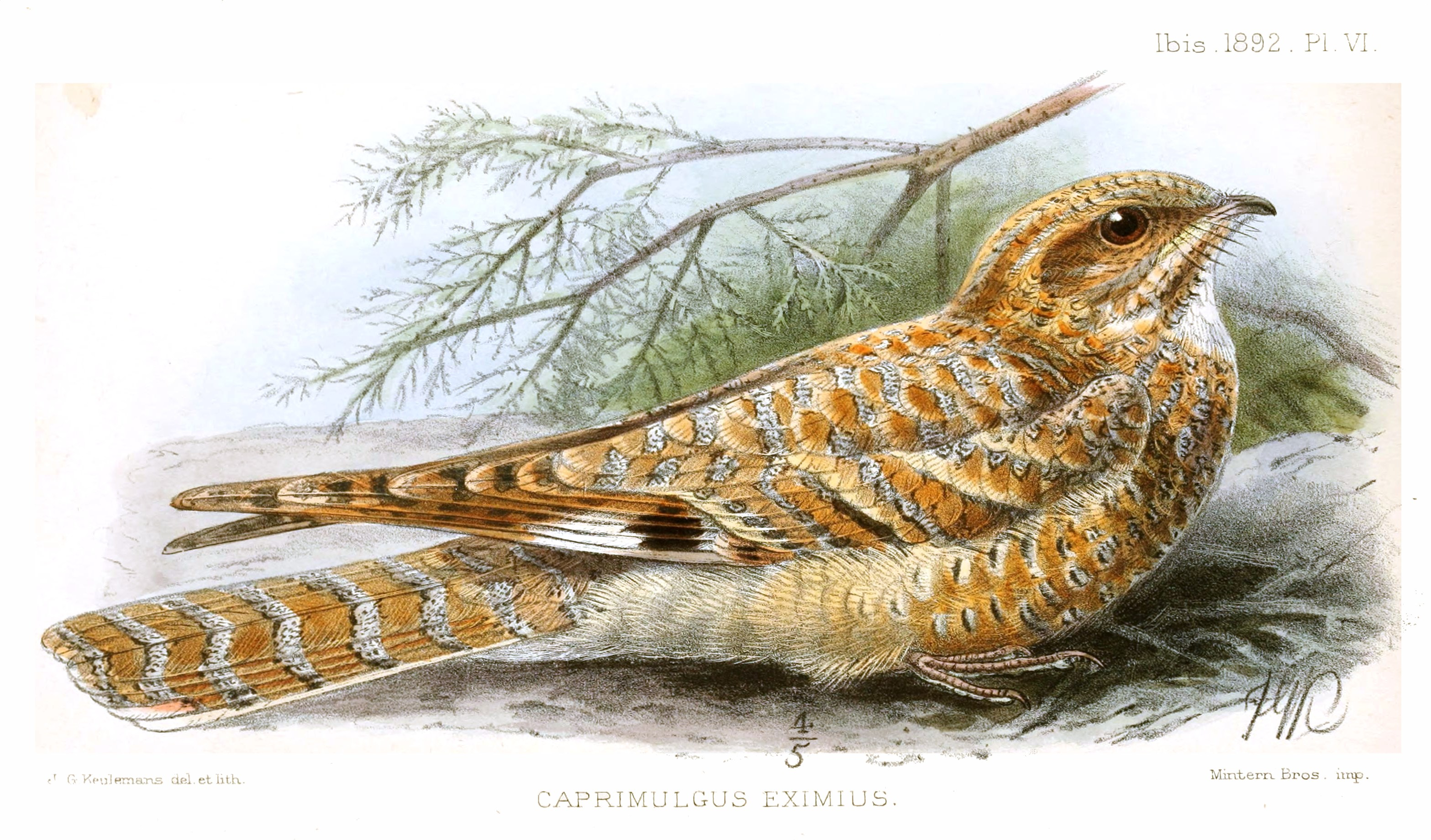

Conservation status
- Least Concern (IUCN 3.1)

Scientific classification
- Kingdom: Animalia
- Phylum: Chordata
- Class: Aves
- Clade: Strisores
- Order: Caprimulgiformes
- Family: Caprimulgidae
- Genus: Caprimulgus
- Species: C. eximius

Binomial name
- Caprimulgus eximius Temminck, 1826

= Golden nightjar =

Species of bird

The golden nightjar (Caprimulgus eximius) is a species of nightjar in the family Caprimulgidae. It is found in Sahel region in northern Sub-Saharan Africa.

== Description ==
The golden nightjar is a distinctively coloured, smallish nightjar which measures 23–25 cm in length. When at rest the golden nightjar appears large headed and the upperparts and wing coverts are tawny buff marked with greyish-white, dark brown edged and speckled, square shaped spots. It has a large whitish patch on its throat, the upper breast is similarly marked to the upperparts but this fades towards the unmarked tawny-buff lower breast and belly. In flight it shows a large white spot towards the tips of the wings and in poor light it appears very pale. Both sexes are alike.

=== Voice ===
The golden nightjar's song is low pitched churr which may last quite a long time and is delivered at dawn and dusk from the ground.

== Distribution ==
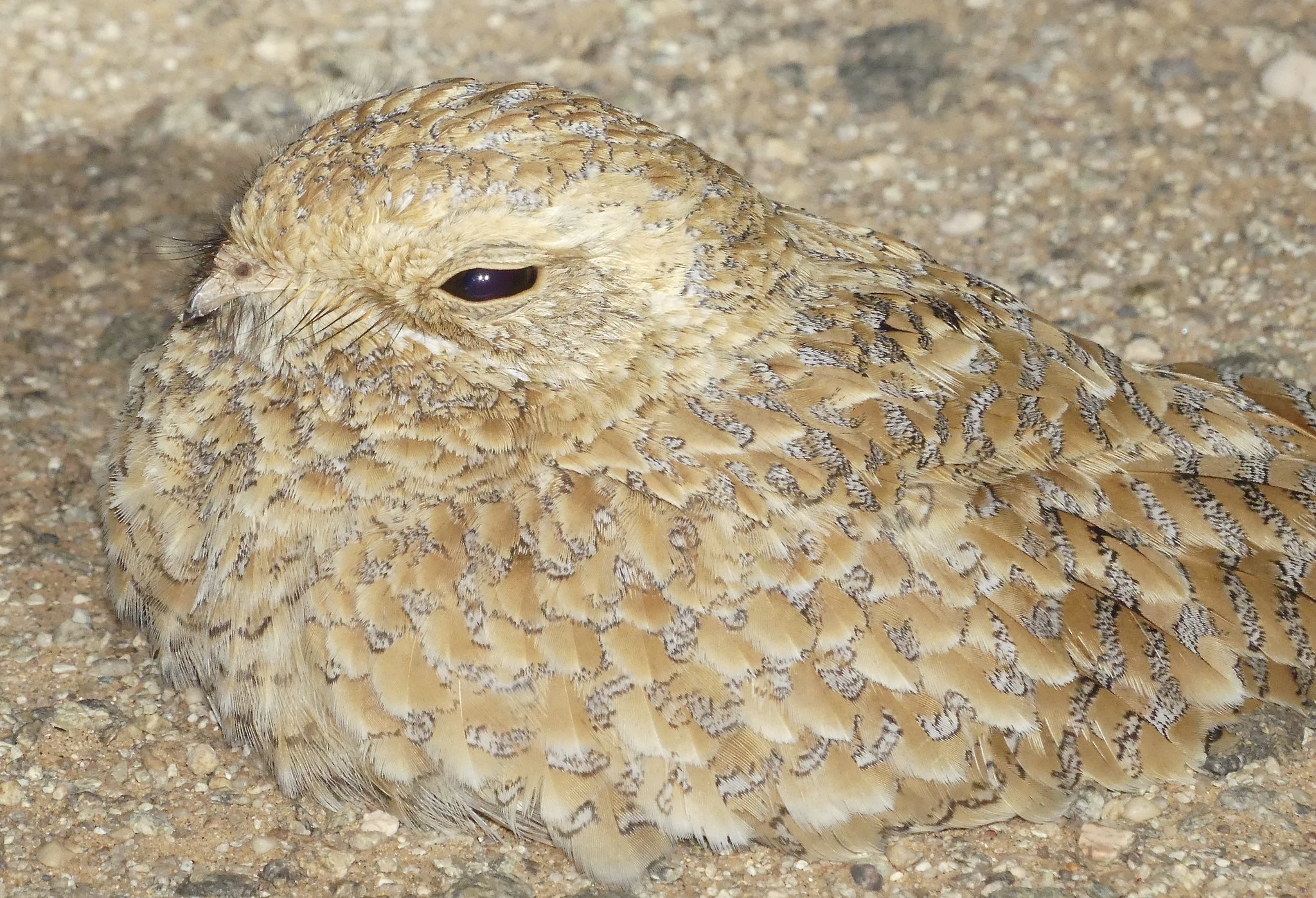
Golden nightjar in Western Sahara at Oued Jenna in April, 2018

The golden nightjar occurs from northern Senegal and Mauritania in the west eastwards to Sudan. In 2015 a female golden nightjar was seen and it, or another, was later found dead in southern Western Sahara and in 2016 a number of birds were noted in the same area suggesting that it may host a breeding population. In 2019, the breeding of the species in the area was confirmed. These were the first records of this species in the Palearctic.

== Habitat ==
The golden nightjar occurs in arid steppes and semi-desert, also on rock, gravelly or stony terrain with clumps of vegetation. It avoids dense scrub or woodland.

== Habits ==
The golden nightjar is active at dawn and dusk and through the night, roosting on the ground during the day and tending to shuffle out of the way of approaching animals rather than flushing. It has been recorded feeding over water bodies at dusk, its diet is made up of larger insects. The normal clutch is 2 eggs which are laid on the ground, usually near a clump of vegetation. Egg laying has been recorded in April–May in the west and March–April in Sudan.
