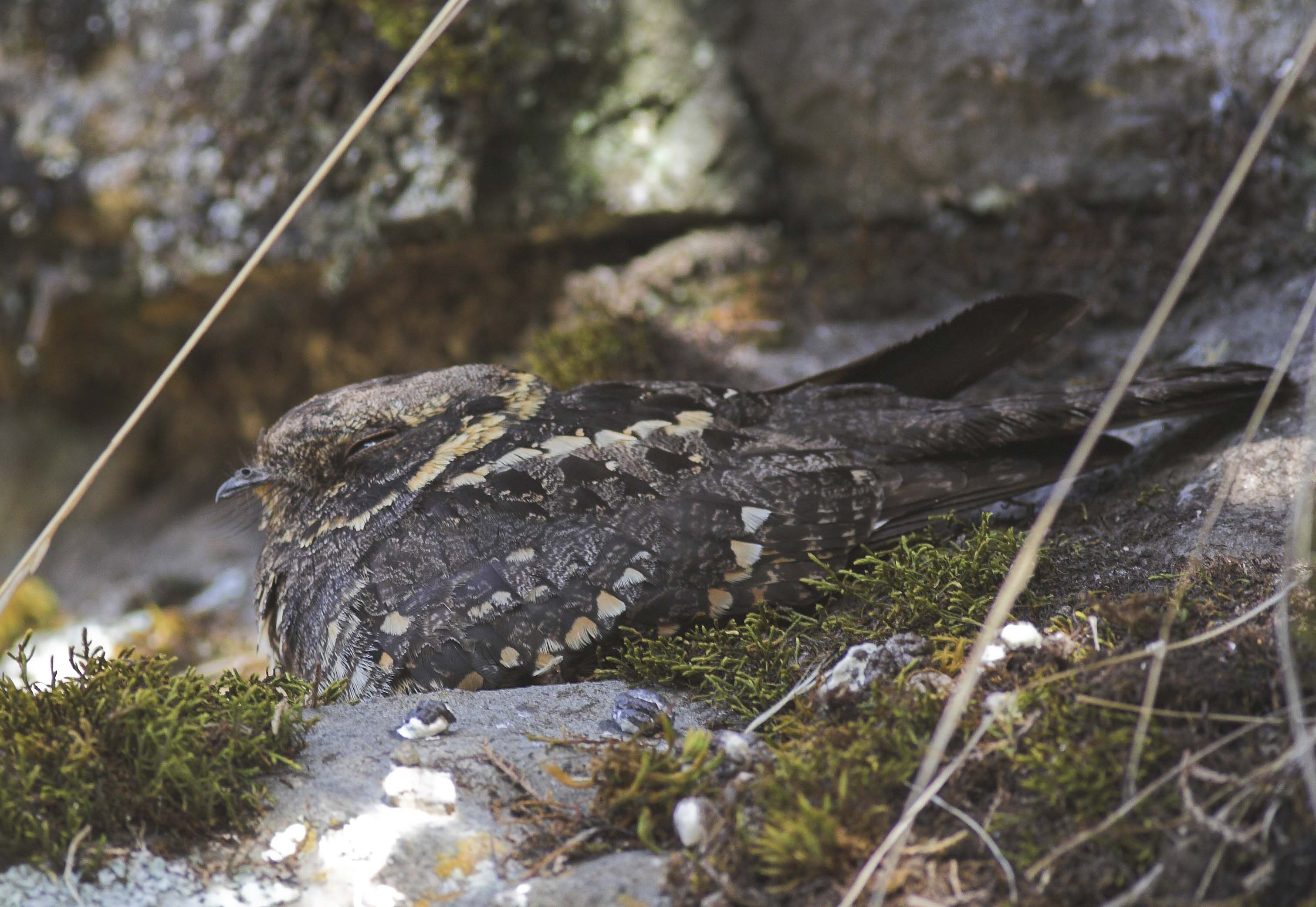

Conservation status
- Least Concern (IUCN 3.1)

Scientific classification
- Kingdom: Animalia
- Phylum: Chordata
- Class: Aves
- Clade: Strisores
- Order: Caprimulgiformes
- Family: Caprimulgidae
- Genus: Caprimulgus
- Species: C. poliocephalus

Binomial name
- Caprimulgus poliocephalus Rüppell, 1840

= Montane nightjar =

Species of bird

The montane nightjar (Caprimulgus poliocephalus), mountain nightjar or Abyssinian nightjar, is a species of nightjar in the family Caprimulgidae. It is native to upland regions of Central and Eastern Africa where it is a locally common species.

== Taxonomy ==
The Montane nightjar was originally described by the German naturalist Eduard Rüppell in 1840. He used the current binomial name Caprimulgus poliocephalus.

There are four subspecies:

- C. p. poliocephalus Rüppell, 1840 – Ethiopia to north Tanzania, also southwest Saudi Arabia
- C. p. ruwenzorii Ogilvie-Grant, 1909 – southwest Uganda, east Democratic Republic of the Congo
- C. p. guttifer Grote, 1921 – Tanzania, Malawi and Zambia
- C. p. koesteri Neumann, 1931 – central Angola

The subspecies C. p. ruwenzorii was formerly sometimes treated as a separate species, the Ruwenzori nightjar. Although a molecular genetic study of these four nightjars has not been published, the results of the detailed measurement of museum specimens suggests that they should be considered as conspecific.

== Description ==
The montane nightjar is a rather dark nightjar growing to a length of about 23 cm (9.1 in). It has somewhat tawny, blackish or chocolate brown dappled plumage. The male has white spots on its four main primaries and the outer edge of the tail is white. The female has buff-coloured spots on its primaries and less white on the tail. The call is a nasal ank-ank-ank, often followed by a high-pitched whistle piiiyu-pirrr, the first syllable descending and then rising, and the second syllable tremulous and descending.

== Distribution and habitat ==
The montane nightjar is native to Central and Eastern Africa. Its range includes Angola, Democratic Republic of the Congo, Eritrea, Ethiopia, Kenya, Malawi, Saudi Arabia, Sudan, Tanzania, Uganda and Zambia. It occurs at altitudes between about 1,000 and 3,350 m (3,300 and 11,000 ft). Like other nightjars, it is nocturnal, feeding on moths and other large insects. It is mostly a forest bird, but is also found in plantations, cultivated areas near forests, and in well-wooded urban areas.

== Status ==
The montane nightjar is a common species with a very wide range. No special threats have been identified and the population trend is thought to be stable. For these reasons, the International Union for Conservation of Nature has rated its conservation status as being of "least concern".
