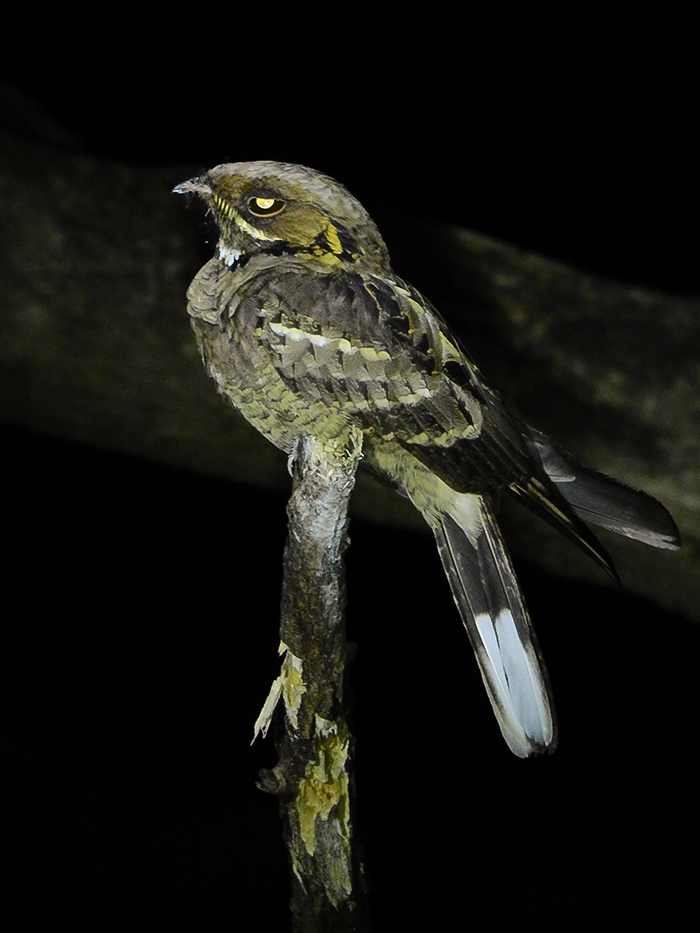
- Caprimulgus atripennis atripennis Mangaon, Raigad, Maharashtra

Conservation status
- Least Concern (IUCN 3.1)

Scientific classification
- Kingdom: Animalia
- Phylum: Chordata
- Class: Aves
- Clade: Strisores
- Order: Caprimulgiformes
- Family: Caprimulgidae
- Genus: Caprimulgus
- Species: C. atripennis

Binomial name
- Caprimulgus atripennis Jerdon, 1845

Audio
- Calls

= Jerdon's nightjar =

Species of bird

Jerdon's nightjar (Caprimulgus atripennis) is a medium-sized nightjar species native to southern India and Sri Lanka. Formerly considered as a subspecies of the long-tailed nightjar, it is best recognized by its distinctive call which sounds like a wooden plank being beaten periodically with each note ending in a quaver. The common name commemorates Thomas C. Jerdon who described the species.

== Taxonomy ==
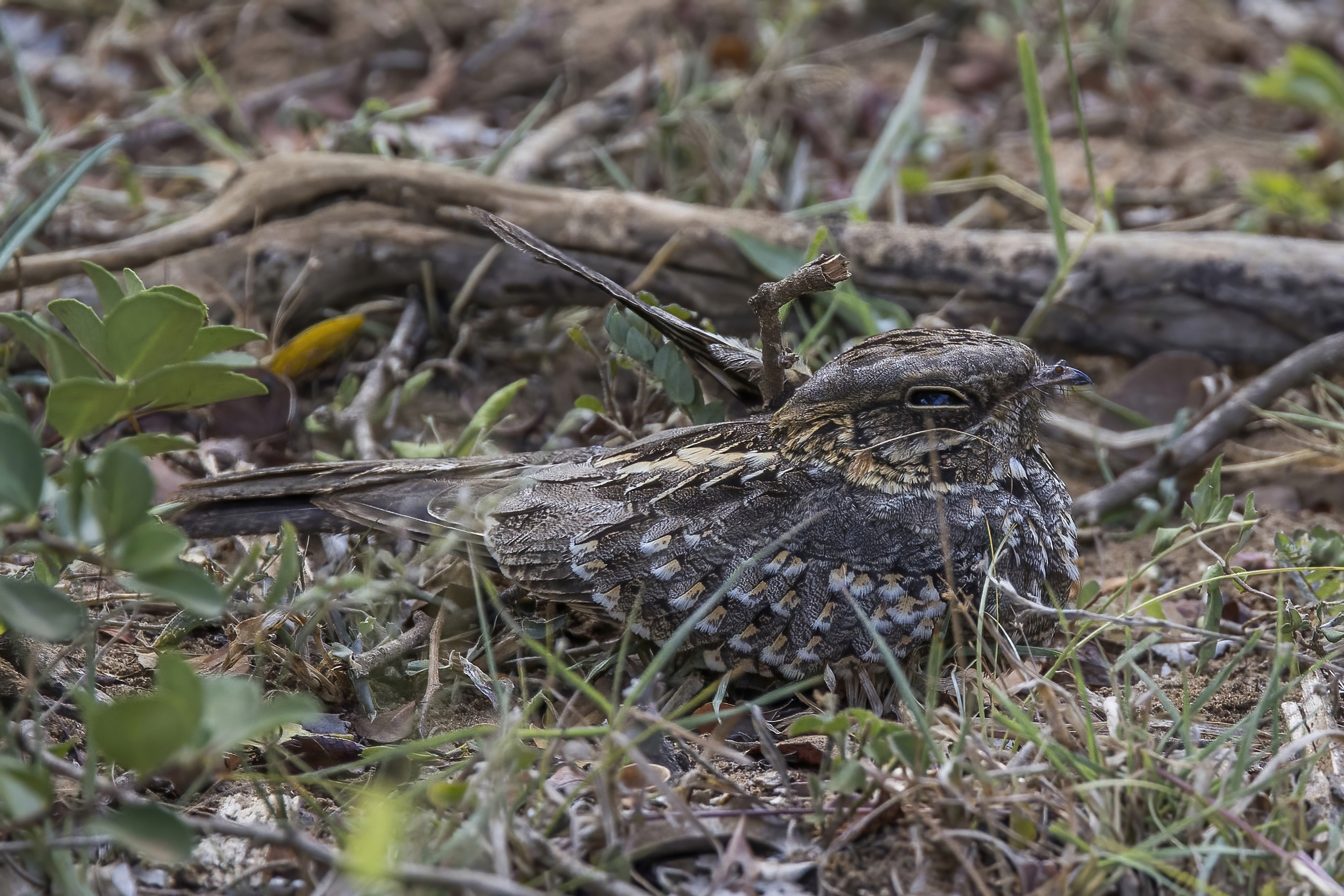
C. a. aequabilis Sri Lanka

Thomas C. Jerdon first described this species in an annotation to his 1845 treatment of the jungle nightjar (C. indicus) in the Illustrations of Indian ornithology. Subsequently, it was sometimes lumped again with C. macrurus, but the co-occurrence of this form and large-tailed nightjar C. macrurus without interbreeding in the northeast of the Indian peninsula was noted in 1987 suggesting their distinctness. It has since been reaffirmed as a full species based on studies of their vocalizations. The subspecies in Sri Lanka is C. a. aequabilis. Jerdon's type locality mentioned as Ghauts has been considered to be the Eastern Ghats west of Nellore.

== Description ==
Like other nightjars, it has a wide gape, long wings, soft downy plumage and nocturnal habits. At 26 cm in overall length, it is almost a head's length larger than the Indian nightjar (C. asiaticus), and differs from that species in its barred tail, rufous rear neck, and wing bars. The vermiculations on the crown are fine giving it a nearly uniform shade. The collar is blackish. The male has a white patch on each wing. Otherwise, their cryptic plumage is mainly variegated buff and brown, as typical for the dark tropical woodland nightjars. This has an unbroken white gorget like the long-tailed nightjar but the tail is shorter. The Sri Lankan aequabilis is slightly smaller and darker.

Its typical call is a fast repetitive ch-woo-woo. Another call is said to be a frog-like croak.

== Behaviour and ecology ==
Open woodland, scrub, and cultivation is the habitat of this nocturnal bird. It flies after sundown with an easy, silent fluttering flight, appearing a bit like an outsized moth at a casual glance. During the day, Jerdon's nightjar lies silent upon the ground, concealed by its plumage; it is then difficult to detect, blending in with the soil.

Nocturnal insects, such as moths, are its food. Unlike the Indian nightjar (C. asiaticus), this species rarely rests on roads during the night, preferring to alight on bushes. This makes it harder to spot, since it is not so readily seen in vehicle headlights. It however roosts on the ground although calling from the trees.

The breeding season is March to July in India and February to May in Sri Lanka. No nest is made; the two marbled eggs are placed upon the bare ground. The brooding bird, covering them closely with its camouflage plumage, is their best protection. The chicks can crawl away from the nest soon after hatching and hide among leaves when alarmed.

== Conservation ==
Jerdon's nightjar has been listed as Least Concern on the IUCN Red List since 2004, as it has a large range, and the population trend is considered stable.
