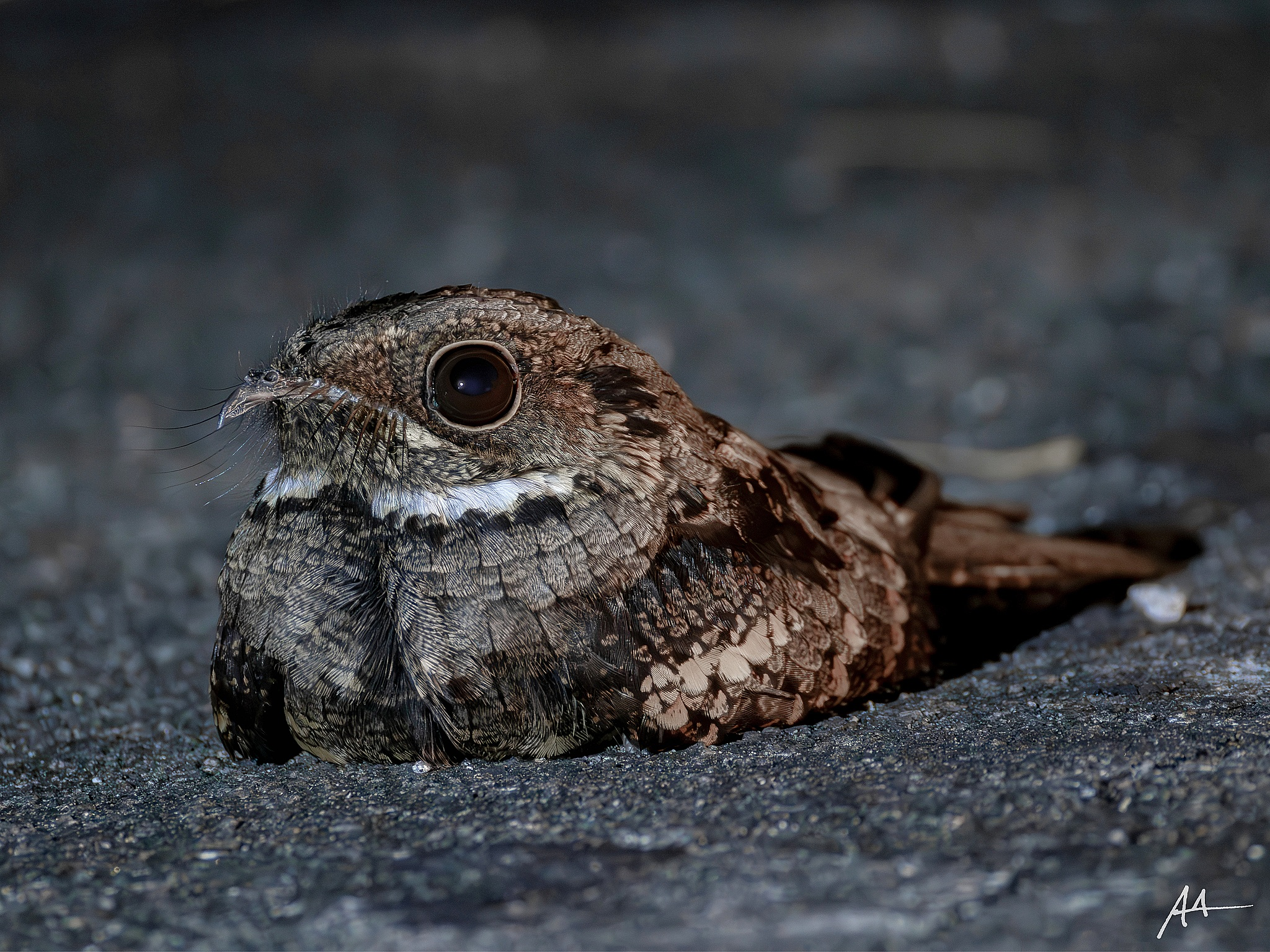

Conservation status
- Least Concern (IUCN 3.1)

Scientific classification
- Kingdom: Animalia
- Phylum: Chordata
- Class: Aves
- Order: Caprimulgiformes
- Family: Caprimulgidae
- Genus: Caprimulgus
- Species: C. manillensis

Binomial name
- Caprimulgus manillensis Walden, 1875

= Philippine nightjar =

Species of bird

The Philippine nightjar (Caprimulgus manillensis) is a species of nightjar in the family Caprimulgidae. It is endemic to the Philippines. Its local names are kandarapa (Tagalog) and tagolilong (Cebuano).

Its natural habitats are tropical moist lowland forest, tropical mangrove forest, and or tropical moist montane forest.

== Description and taxonomy ==
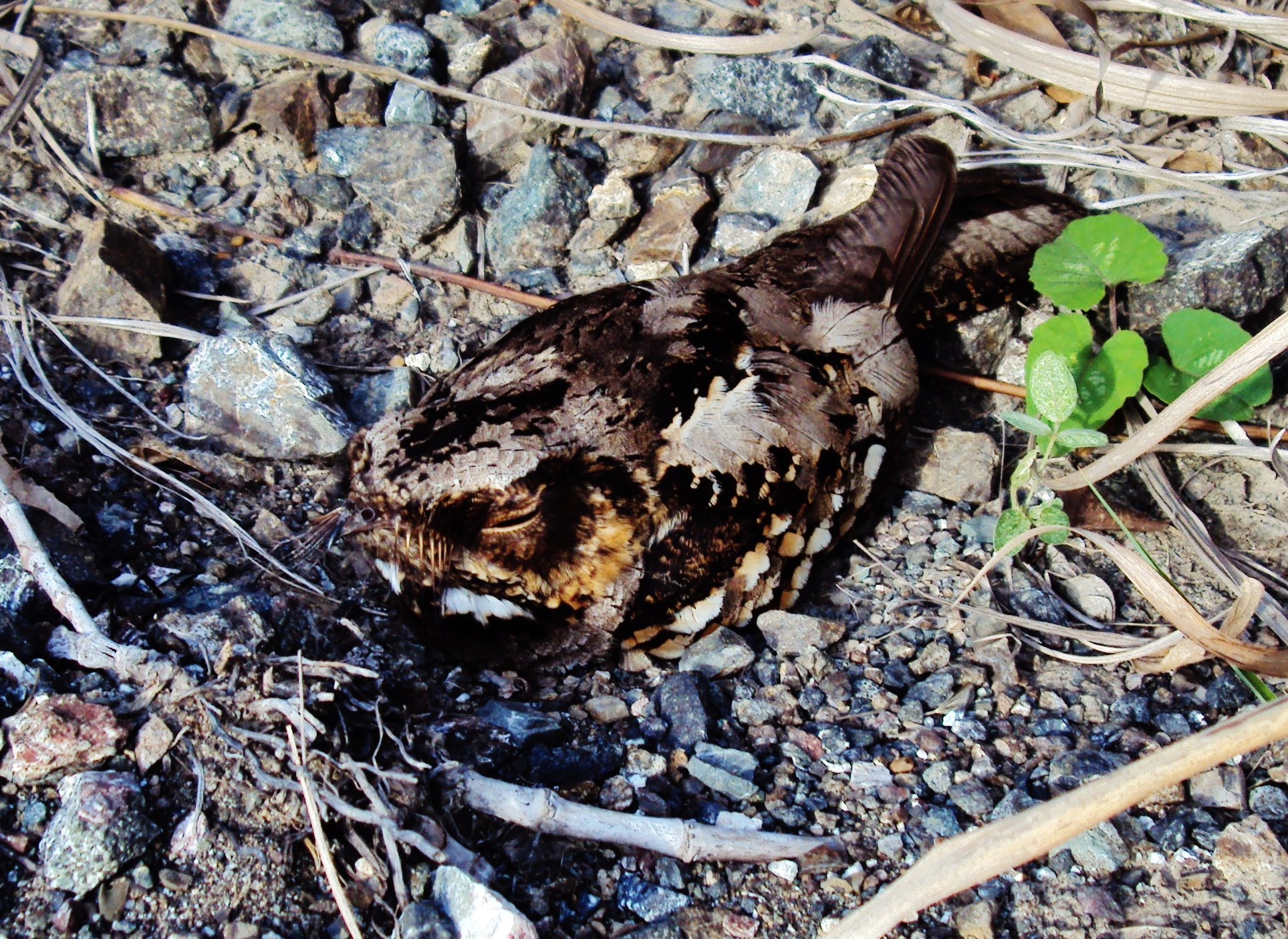
A nesting Philippine nightjar

This species is monotypic.

== Ecology and behavior ==
Known to feed on insects while in flight. Otherwise not much is known about its diet.

Nests on the ground without creating any structures. Lays one to two oval and splotched brown eggs, typically in the months of April to June which is the breeding season for most Philippine birds.

== Habitat and conservation status ==
Has a diverse range of habitats from primary and secondary lowland and montane forest, pine forest and second growth, scrubland, beaches and even agricultural lands. Recorded from sea-level to 2000 meters above sea level.

The IUCN has classified the species as being of Least Concern where it is said to be locally common. While the Philippines has faced massive deforestation, this species adaptability has allowed it to survive better than other Philippine forest birds.

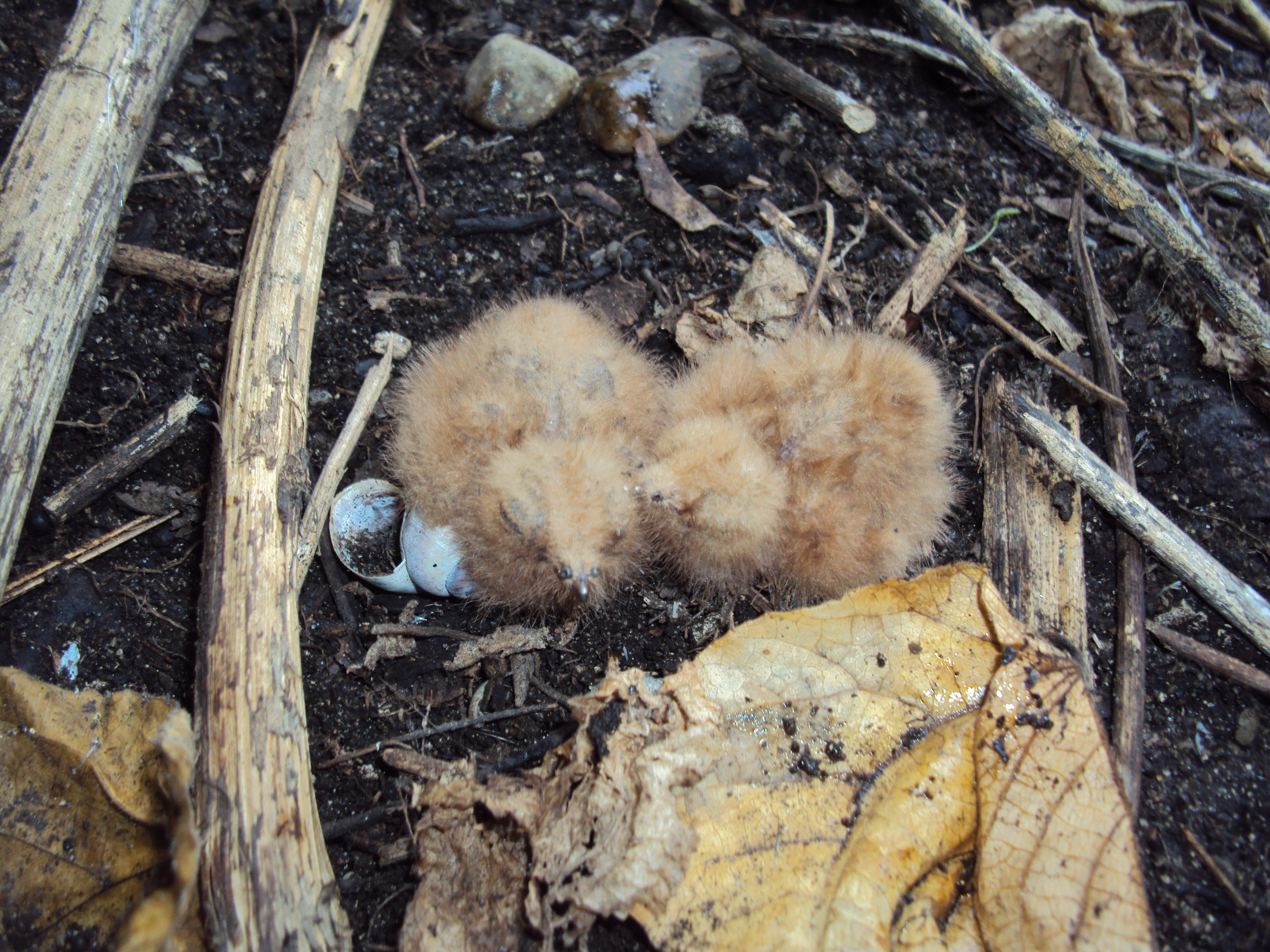
A day old and two days old Philippine nightjars
