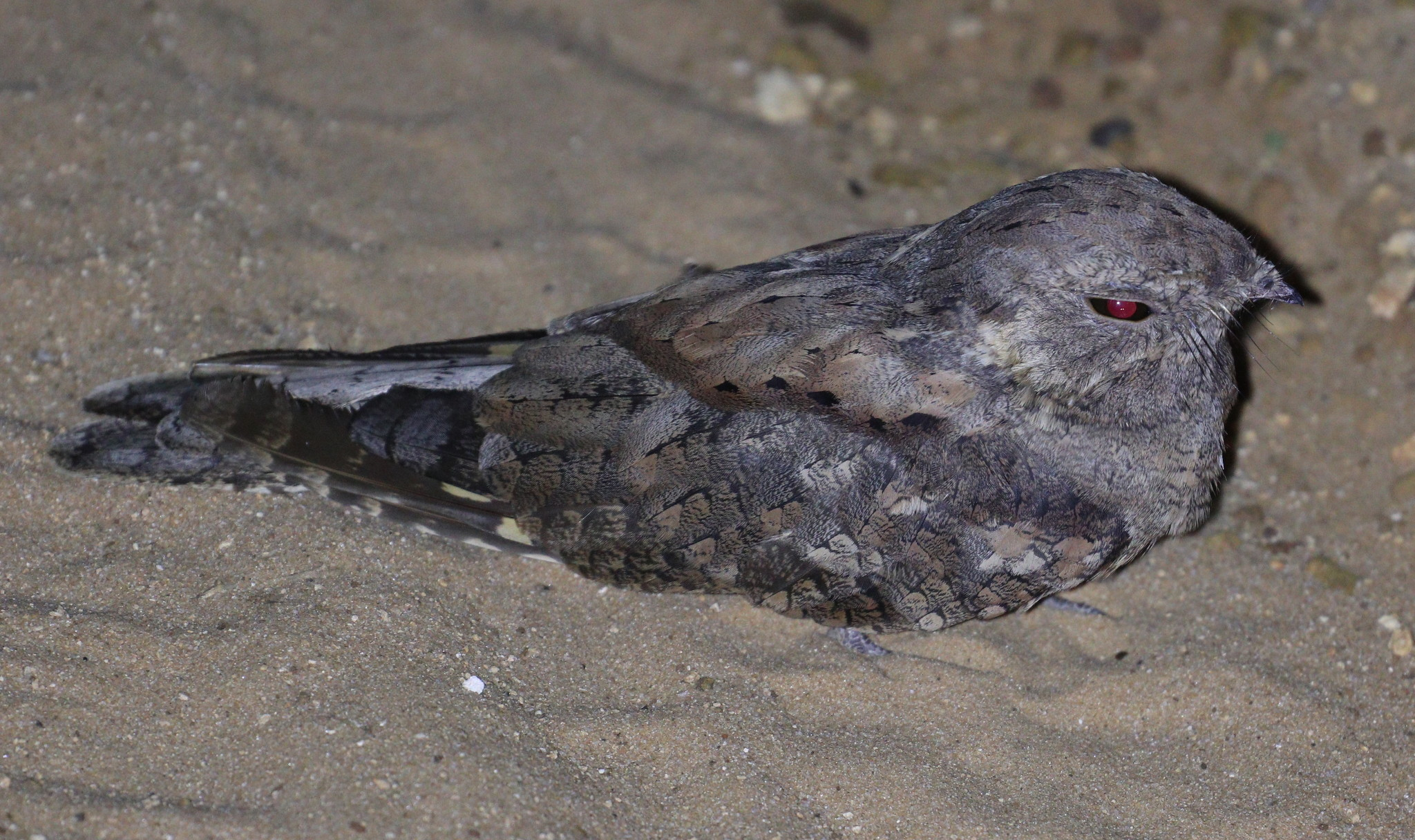

Conservation status
- Least Concern (IUCN 3.1)

Scientific classification
- Kingdom: Animalia
- Phylum: Chordata
- Class: Aves
- Clade: Strisores
- Order: Caprimulgiformes
- Family: Caprimulgidae
- Genus: Caprimulgus
- Species: C. inornatus

Binomial name
- Caprimulgus inornatus Heuglin, 1869

= Plain nightjar =

Species of bird

The plain nightjar (Caprimulgus inornatus) is a species of nightjar in the family Caprimulgidae. It breeds in the southern Sahel, Southern Sudan, the Horn of Africa and the southwestern Arabian Peninsula. It migrates to lower latitudes - including central Congo and northern Tanzania. A rather plain looking nightjar with grey-brown, brown, and rufous morphs. Males have white spots on primaries (4 feathers), large white corners to tail, and no white on the throat (may show black spots on the crown and scapulars like Star-spotted Nightjar). Females have buffy-brown wing spots, and no white on the tail.

== Conservation status ==
This species has an extremely large range, and hence does not approach the thresholds for Vulnerable under the range size criterion (Extent of Occurrence <20,000 km2 combined with a declining or fluctuating range size, habitat extent/quality, or population size and a small number of locations or severe fragmentation). The population trend appears to be stable, and hence the species does not approach the thresholds for Vulnerable under the population trend criterion (>30% decline over ten years or three generations). The population size has not been quantified, but it is not believed to approach the thresholds for Vulnerable under the population size criterion (<10,000 mature individuals with a continuing decline estimated to be >10% in ten years or three generations, or with a specified population structure). For these reasons the species is evaluated as Least Concern.

== Distribution ==
Sub-Saharan Africa and south-western Arabian Peninsula.

Western Africa: Mauritania, Senegambia, Senegal, The Gambia, Guinea-Bissau, Guinea, Mali, Sierra Leone, Liberia, Ivory Coast, Burkina Faso, Ghana, Togo, Benin, Nigeria, Niger, Chad, Cameroon, Central African Republic, Equatorial Guinea, Democratic Republic of Congo

Eastern Africa: Sudan, Eritrea, Ethiopia, Somalia, Kenya, Uganda, Tanzania and recently sighted in Rwanda Akagera national park in March 2022

Arabian Peninsula: Saudi Arabia, Yemen

== Taxonomy ==
This is a monotypic species^{[1]}.

Three subspecies are recognised by some authorities: C. i. inornatus, C. i. malbranti, C. i. ludovicianus^{[2]}

== Habitat ==
Thornscrub.
