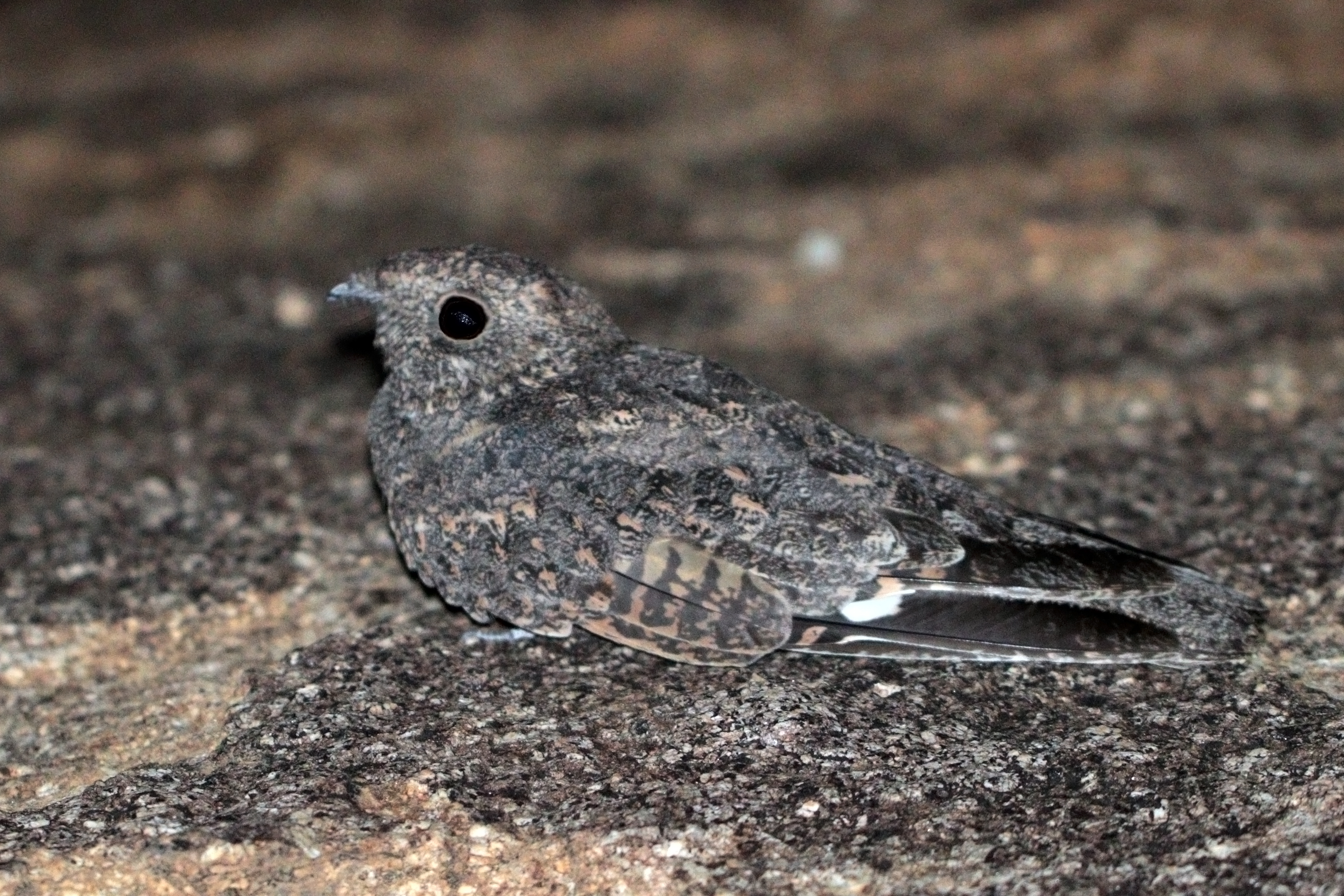
- male
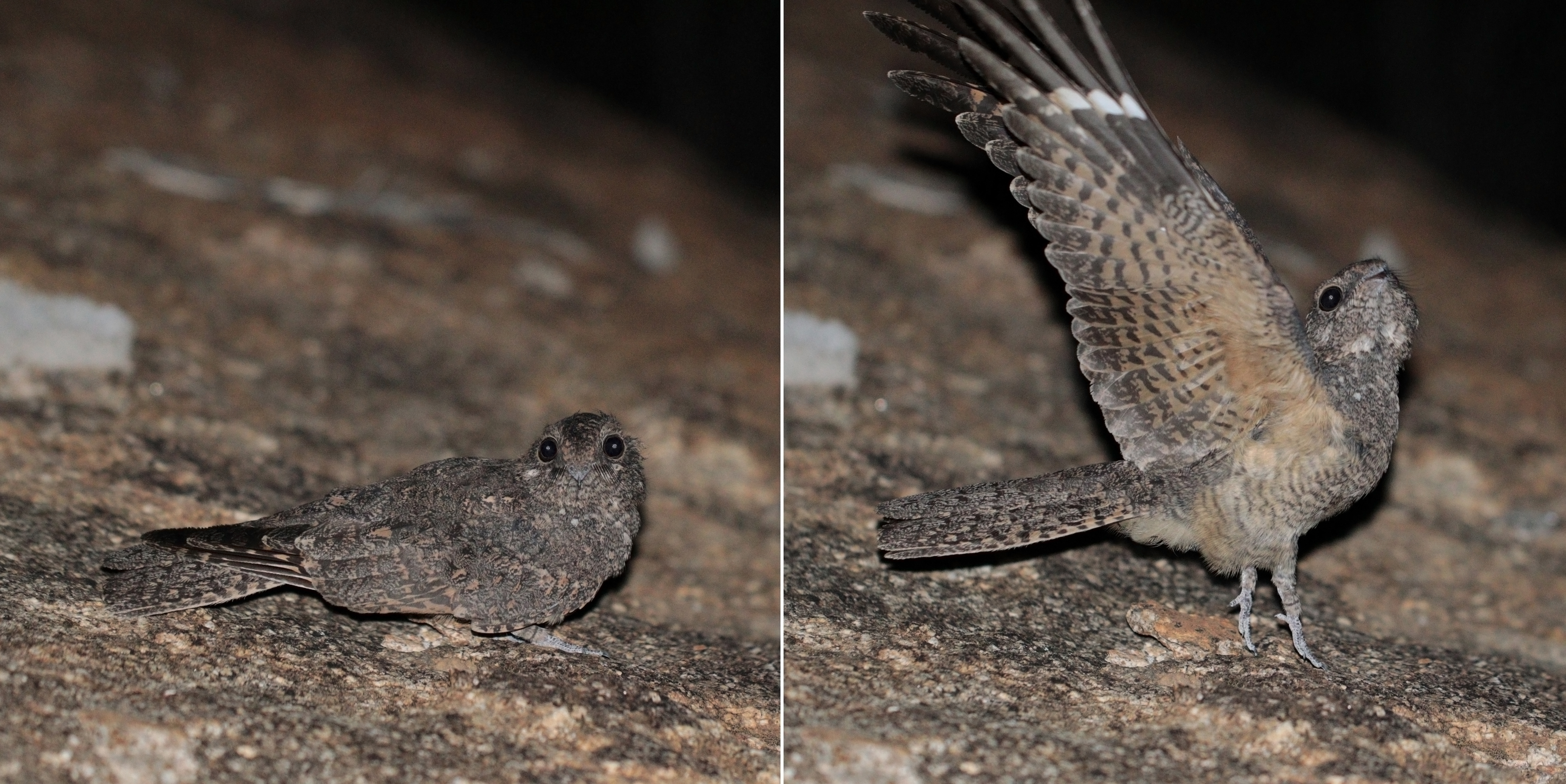
- female Both in Namibia

Conservation status
- Least Concern (IUCN 3.1)

Scientific classification
- Kingdom: Animalia
- Phylum: Chordata
- Class: Aves
- Order: Caprimulgiformes
- Family: Caprimulgidae
- Genus: Caprimulgus
- Species: C. tristigma

Binomial name
- Caprimulgus tristigma Rüppell, 1840

= Freckled nightjar =

Species of bird

The freckled nightjar or freckled rock nightjar (Caprimulgus tristigma) is a species of nightjar in the family Caprimulgidae. It has a wide yet patchy distribution throughout the Afrotropics.

== Range and habitat ==
This species occurs throughout sub-Saharan African in localized populations. It is scarce in western Africa, occurring more commonly in the East. In the southern part of the continent, it is a year-round resident of the colder and drier areas, occurring most commonly in Zimbabwe, northern and eastern Botswana, western Mozambique, and eastern South Africa.

It has been found in Angola, Benin, Botswana, Burkina Faso, Burundi, Cameroon, Central African Republic, Republic of the Congo, Democratic Republic of the Congo, Ivory Coast, Eswatini, Ethiopia, Gabon, Ghana, Guinea, Kenya, Liberia, Malawi, Mali, Mozambique, Namibia, Niger, Nigeria, Rwanda, Sierra Leone, South Africa, South Sudan, Tanzania, Togo, Uganda, Zambia, and Zimbabwe.

== Description ==
The freckled nightjar is a large, powerfully-build species of nightjar with long wings and relatively short tails. They lack any prominent markings and appear dark gray or nearly black from a distance. At closer range, white, cinnamon, and pale buff freckling is visible on the upperparts of adults. Their underparts are typically dark brown with a whitish and cinnamon barring pattern. Their plumage provides excellent camouflage for rocky surfaces.

They are sexually dimorphic. In flight, males have small white spots on the four outer primaries and their two outer tail feathers have white tips. Females have 3 to 4 smaller white spots on their outer primaries and do not have white on their outer tail feathers. In both sexes, when the wings are folded, the white spots are generally not visible.

== Call ==
This species sings in the early morning and evening, as well as on moonlit nights. The song can be variable but is typically in the form of a whistle consisting of two or three whow notes. It is typically repeated for 30 seconds or more at a time. From a distance, it may sound like a dog barking.

The flight or threat call consists of two or three wock sounds delivered at a low frequency. The alarm call is a yelping gobble sound. For distraction displays, soft grok-grok grumbles are delivered.

== Behavior ==
This species is crepuscular and nocturnal. During the day, it roosts on bare or lichen-covered rock surfaces, which may be situated in the open or in vegetated areas. They can tolerate surface temperatures of up to 60 °C. At night, they forage in nearby woodlands or open areas. They also frequently sit in the middle of roadways at night.

Research has shown that this species has the capacity to enter torpor during the coldest, driest parts of its annual cycle.

=== Feeding and diet ===
Their diet primarily consists of flying insects such as moths, termites, and chafers. Other food items that have been recorded as part of their diet include beetles, butterflies, cockroaches, mantids, lacewings, antlions, grasshoppers, bees, wasps, and ants. During the winter, activity levels are significantly reduced due to large seasonal fluctuations in food resource availability. Due to the size of its gape, which is larger than any other nightjar, this species is able to swallow 3.5 cm-long insects whole.

They forage at dusk, dawn, and occasionally on moonlit nights over rocky landscapes, broken ground, and cattle pastures. They hawk flying insects during short flights out and then glide back to their perches located on boulders or at rocky bank edges.

=== Reproduction and breeding ===
This species is monogamous, with pair-bonds that are fairly long-lasting. In one instance, a pair-bond was found to last for 3 years. They tend to exhibit strong site fidelity and often re-use the same nesting sites year after year. They are rupicolous breeders, building their nests in barren, natural hollows within rock formations that may be partially shaded or completely un-shaded. Wind-blown plant and rock chip debris often fills their nesting hollows.

In eastern Africa, egg-laying season is either from September to November or from May to June, depending on the region. In southern Africa, laying tends to take place between August and December, with peaks occurring from September to November. In Nigeria, laying occurs between January and May. If the first clutch is lost, they usually lay a replacement clutch. They may also lay a second clutch following the fledging of the first brood. Females lay clutches of two eggs on successive days. Incubation lasts for 18.5 to 20 days and is done by females during the day and partially by males during the night. The young are quite mobile within 24 hours of hatching and are cared for both parents. The female broods during the day, while at night, she alternates with the male to brood and feed the nestlings. The chicks are very well camouflaged and blend in with the surrounding rocks. They take their first flight at 19 to 20 days old.

== Conservation status ==
Although the global population size has not been quantified, the population is thought to be stable, with relatively common occurrences throughout most of its range. It is classified as Least Concern.
