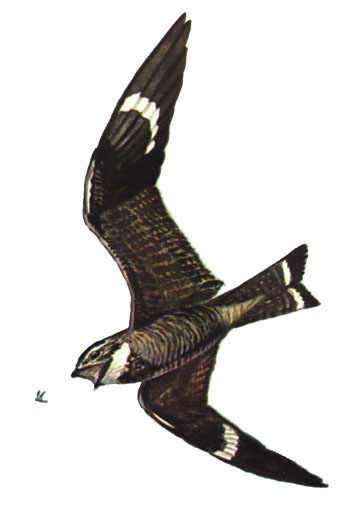
- Common nighthawk, Chordeiles minor

Scientific classification
- Kingdom: Animalia
- Phylum: Chordata
- Class: Aves
- Order: Caprimulgiformes
- Family: Caprimulgidae
- Subfamily: Chordeilinae

Genera
- Chordeiles; Lurocalis; Nyctiprogne

= Nighthawk =

Subfamily of birds

Nighthawks are ten New World species of nightjar in the family Caprimulgidae. They have short bills and generally lack the elongated rictal bristles that are present in other nightjars. They also tend to be less nocturnal than other nightjars and can be observed feeding at dawn and at dusk.

== Discovery ==
It is believed that the term "nighthawk", first recorded in the King James Bible of 1611, was originally a local name in England for the European nightjar. Its use in the Americas to refer to members of the genus Chordeiles and related genera was first recorded in 1778 when John Cassin, a renowned ornithologist responsible for the establishment of the Delaware County Institute of Science, established the classification.

Fossil records indicate that specimens later identified to be the common nighthawks (Chordeiles minor) excavated in the south-western United States could be traced back as far as 400,000 years (during the Pleistocene era), indicating that the subfamily has been a component of New World ecology since then.

== Taxonomy ==
The nightjar family Caprimulgidae has been traditionally divided into two subfamilies, Chordeilinae containing the nighthawks in four genera, and Caprimulginae containing all the remaining species. The subfamily Chordeilinae had been introduced in 1851 by the American ornithologist John Cassin. The nighthawks were placed in four genera: Chordeiles Swainson, 1832 containing five species, Lurocalis Cassin, 1851 containing two species, Podager Wagler, 1832 containing the nacunda nighthawk, and Nyctiprogne Bonaparte, 1857 containing two species.

Beginning in 2010 molecular phylogenetic studies have found that the nacunda nighthawk in the monotypic genus Podager was embedded with members of the genus Chordeiles and that the three remaining genera were not closely related to one another making the subfamily Chordeilinae non-monophyletic.

=== Species ===
Image	Genus	Living species
	Nyctiprogne Bonaparte, 1857	Band-tailed nighthawk, Nyctiprogne leucopyga; Plain-tailed nighthawk, Nyctiprogne vielliardi
	Lurocalis Cassin, 1851	Rufous-bellied nighthawk Lurocalis rufiventris; Short-tailed nighthawk, Lurocalis semitorquatus
	Chordeiles Swainson, 1832	Nacunda nighthawk, Chordeiles nacunda; Antillean nighthawk, Chordeiles gundlachii; Lesser nighthawk, Chordeiles acutipennis; Common nighthawk, Chordeiles minor; Least nighthawk, Chordeiles pusillus; Sand-colored nighthawk, Chordeiles rupestris
