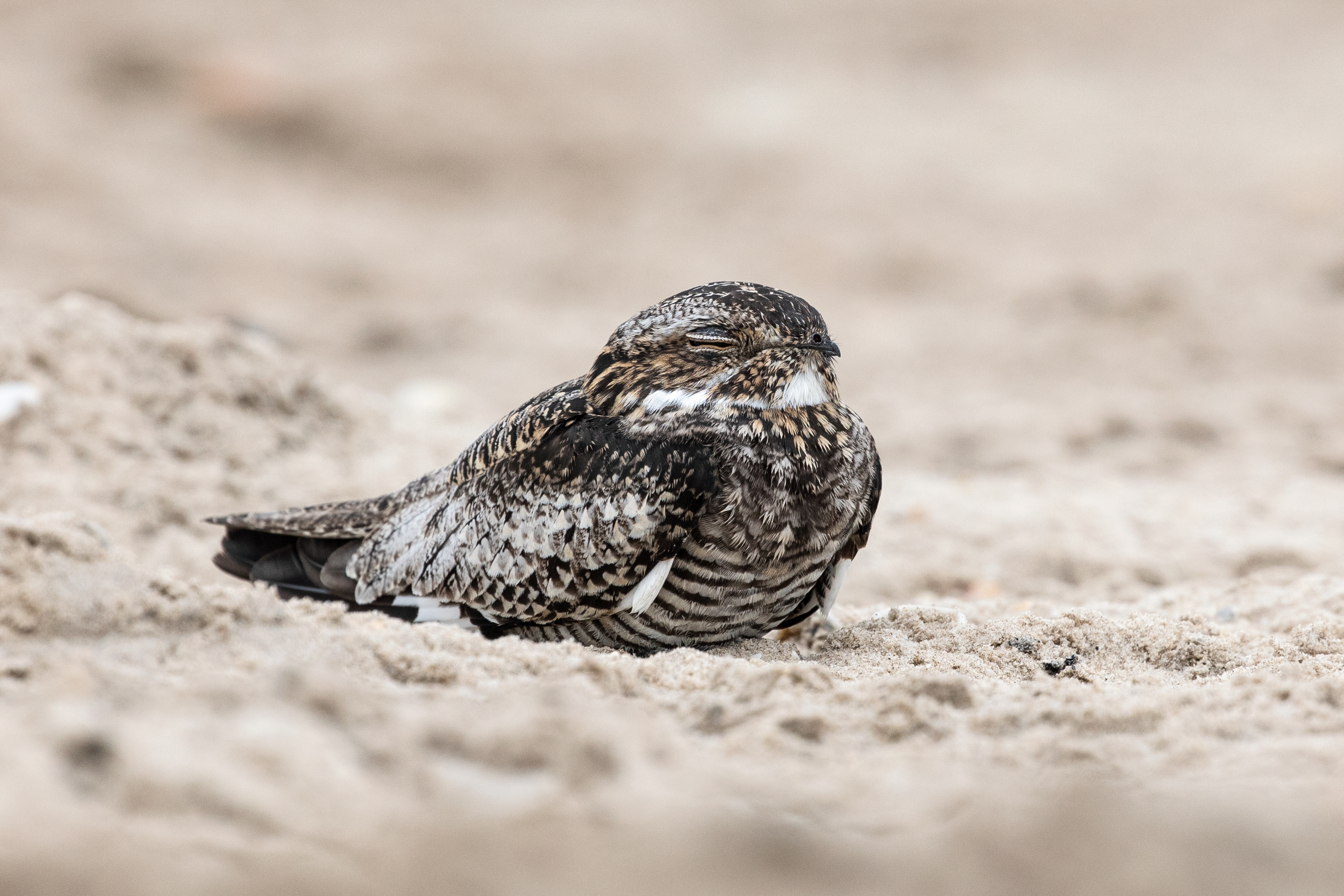

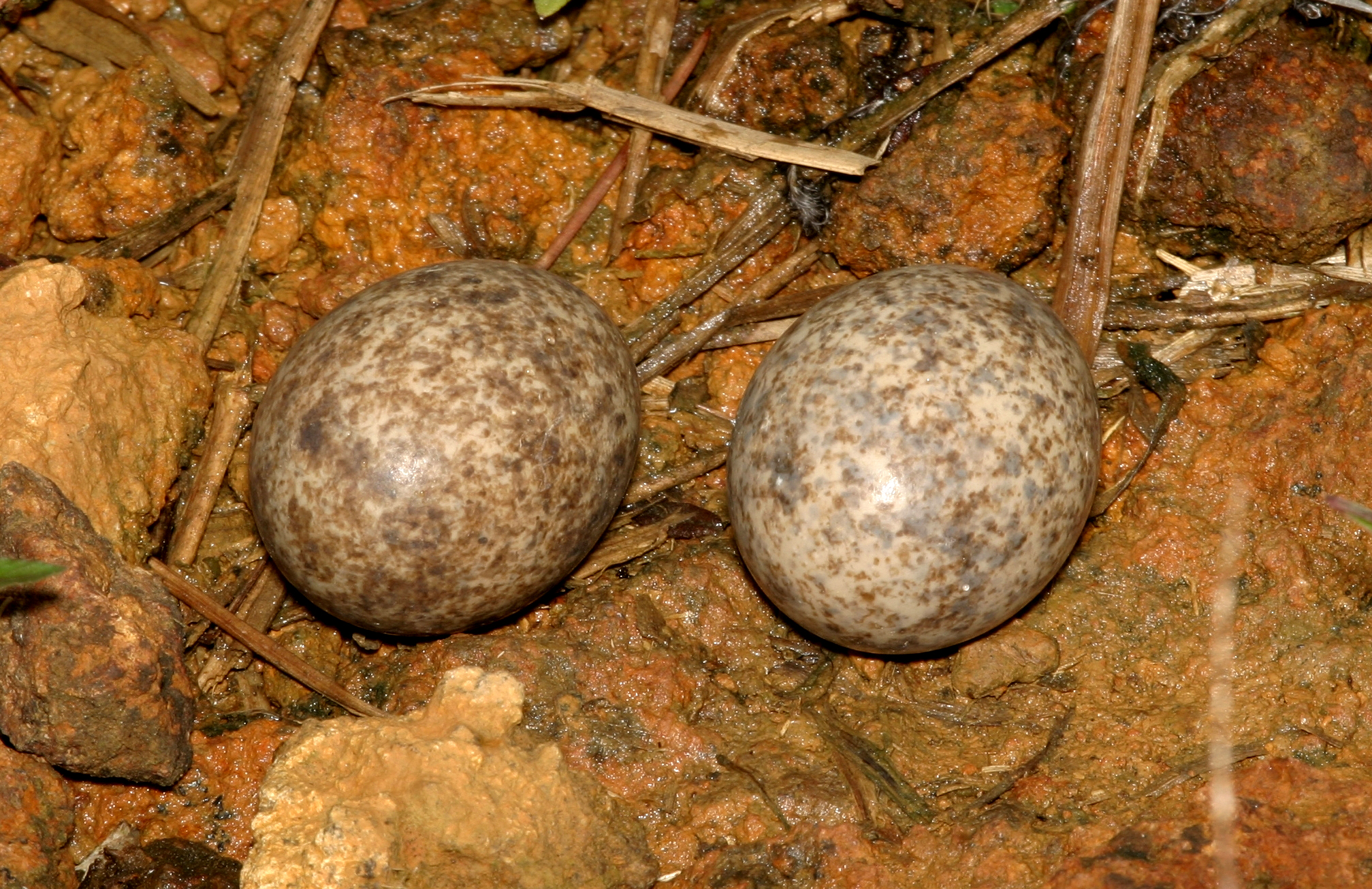

Conservation status
- Least Concern (IUCN 3.1)

Scientific classification
- Kingdom: Animalia
- Phylum: Chordata
- Class: Aves
- Order: Caprimulgiformes
- Family: Caprimulgidae
- Genus: Chordeiles
- Species: C. acutipennis

Binomial name
- Chordeiles acutipennis (Hermann, 1783)
- Range Nonbreeding Breeding Migration Year-round

= Lesser nighthawk =

Species of bird

The lesser nighthawk (Chordeiles acutipennis) is a nightjar found throughout a large part of the Americas. This bird looks similar to the common nighthawk but is slightly smaller, has a slightly less deeply forked tail, and is more buffy in coloration. Their distinctive mouths are very well adapted for capturing insects mid-flight.

== Taxonomy ==
Birds of the order Caprimulgiformes resemble owls and are primarily nocturnal insectivores. This group often has reduced feet, large mouths, and a camouflage coloring to blend in with their environment. The family Caprimulgidae, also known as nightjars, consists of over 70 insectivorous birds which are commonly classified by their long pointed wings. Their habitat and distribution is very broad range. Lesser nighthawks belong to the Chordeiles genus which contains 6 other species of nighthawk such as the common nighthawk, Antillean nighthawk, and sand-coloured nighthawk. The classification of nightjars are constantly being changed and renewed in attempt to group species with their closest relation.

Seven subspecies are recognised. Their breeding ranges are as follows.

- C. a. texensis Lawrence, 1857 – southwest USA to central Mexico
- C. a. littoralis Brodkorb, 1940 – south Mexico to Costa Rica
- C. a. micromeris Oberholser, 1914 – south Yucatán Peninsula and Belize
- C. a. acutipennis (Hermann, 1783) – north, central South America to north Argentina
- C. a. crissalis Miller, AH, 1959 – southwest Colombia
- C. a. aequatorialis Chapman, 1923 – west Colombia, west Ecuador and northwest Peru (?)
- C. a. exilis (Lesson, RP, 1839) – west Peru

== Description ==
The lesser nighthawk is known for its large mouth and small feet. Its natural brown and gray colors blend into its surroundings, making it hard to spot in the daytime while it sleeps. This long-winged and long-tailed species exhibits slight differences between the male and female. Male lesser nighthawks have a prominent white bar at the end of their tails and wing tips while females have a more cream color bar on their wing tips and lack the stripe on their tail. Both males and females feature a white v-shaped mark on their neck. Although its mouth is large, the lesser nighthawk's beak is short and curved.

== Distribution and habitat ==
Native to southern North America, the lesser nighthawk inhabits regions of arid, dry deserts or grasslands. Unlike the common nighthawk, it shows a preference to open, drier habitats with lower elevation. It typically chooses habitats that have large swarms of insects as that is its primary food source. It migrates in the fall and spends winters around southern Central America and northern South America. The lesser nighthawk will then return to the southern United States for spring and summer to breed.

== Behavior ==
=== Vocalization ===
The lesser nighthawk is very similar to its relative, the common nighthawk, though it tends to be a much quieter bird. The bird usually maintains a quiet demeanor, and it is quite rare to encounter its distinctive whines or trilling calls outside of its breeding grounds. Its toadlike trills can be sung in sequences lasting 7–13 seconds and can extend to over 3 minutes. Its calls sound like a low, gurgled laugh.

=== Diet ===
The lesser nighthawk is predominately a nocturnal insectivore that captures prey in flight. Despite its relatively small bill, it possesses a broad mouth equipped with fine hairs that aid in trapping its food. Its diet primarily consists of flies, mosquitoes, moths, and June bugs. The lesser nighthawk is an opportunistic feeder, meaning they can adapt to a diverse range of food sources, readily adjusting to the available prey. Nighthawks typically target the most abundant and easily captured prey. Depending on the season, they may forage individually or in groups.

=== Reproduction ===
During courtship, the male engages in an elaborate aerial display, circling the female with his throat puffed out while emitting a trilling call. Female nighthawks do not build nests; instead, they lay their eggs directly on the ground. To shield their eggs from potential predators, the females rely on their natural camouflage. Living in warm, desert areas means that the female must not leave her eggs in one spot in the heat for too long, therefore, she will periodically move her eggs by rolling them into areas with shade. The female nighthawk will lay 2 clay colored eggs with gray-purple spots coating them. The incubation period spans about 18 days, and the nestling phase continues for 21 days. Both parents contribute with feeding their young by regurgitating food into their mouths. Once hatched, the nestlings quickly gain mobility, allowing them to move short distances in case of predator disturbance.

== In culture ==
Nightjars are also known as "goatsuckers" based on an ancient Greek myth. They are believed to use their wide mouths to suck goats milk.

== Conservation status ==
The lesser nighthawk is of least concern with regards to its conservation status. Climate change will affect the range of the nighthawk, however.

== Adaptations ==
The lesser nighthawk has developed the ability to endure extreme ranges of temperature. When faced in severe heat, the nighthawk utilizes a trait known as gular fluttering. The action involves quick throat vibrations that effectively pump air into their system, resulting in a cooling effect for the bird. This adaptation is crucial for females as they often choose to breed in the hot deserts, where they remain exposed to the intense sun while tending to their nests.

== Flight ==
The lesser nighthawk typically flies low to the ground. This method of flight helps in capturing insects that tend to swarm around lights at night. The bird's buoyant wings carry them in flight in a V-shape with short glides or flutters similar that of a butterfly.
