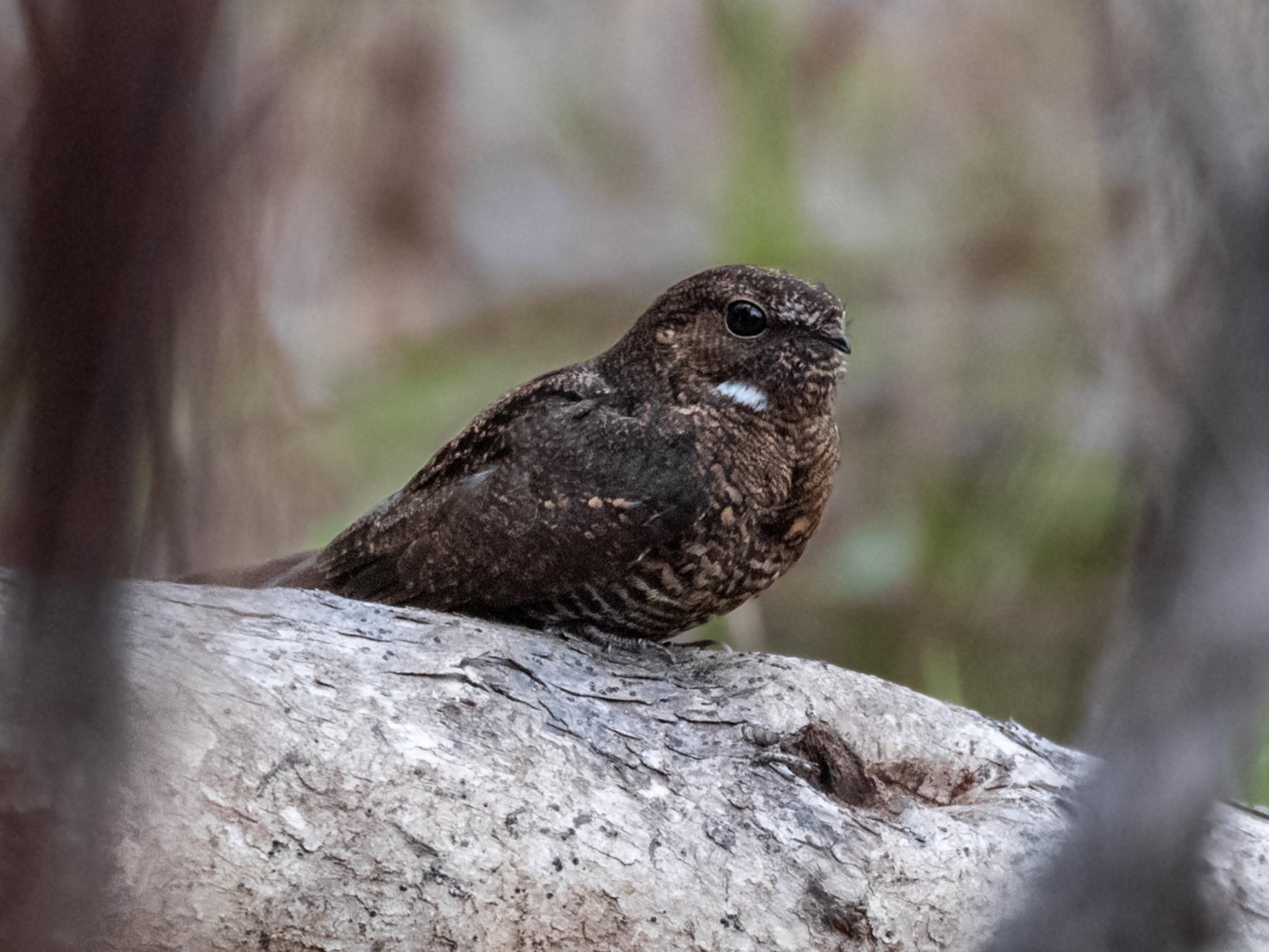
- Band-tailed nighthawk (Nyctiprogne leucopyga)

Scientific classification
- Domain: Eukaryota
- Kingdom: Animalia
- Phylum: Chordata
- Class: Aves
- Clade: Strisores
- Order: Caprimulgiformes
- Family: Caprimulgidae
- Subfamily: Chordeilinae
- Genus: Nyctiprogne; Bonaparte, 1857

Type species
- Caprimulgus leucopygus Spix, 1825

= Nyctiprogne =

Genus of birds

Nyctiprogne is a genus of small South American nightjars in the nightjar family Caprimulgidae.

These are small sexually monomorphic nightjars with short bills, semi‐concealed nostrils, and unmarked wings. The plumage is dark brown or blackish overall with small white patches on either side of the throat, The wings are long and pointed.

== Taxonomy ==
The genus Nyctiprogne was introduced in 1847 by the French naturalist Charles Lucien Bonaparte to accommodate a single species, Caprimulgus leucopygus Spix, 1825, the band-tailed nighthawk, which becomes the type species by monotypy. The genus name is derived from the Ancient Greek νυκτι-/nukti- meaning "night-" or "nocturnal" and Latin progne or procne meaning "swallow".

The genus contains the following two species:

- Band-tailed nighthawk (Nyctiprogne leucopyga)
- Plain-tailed nighthawk (Nyctiprogne vielliardi)
