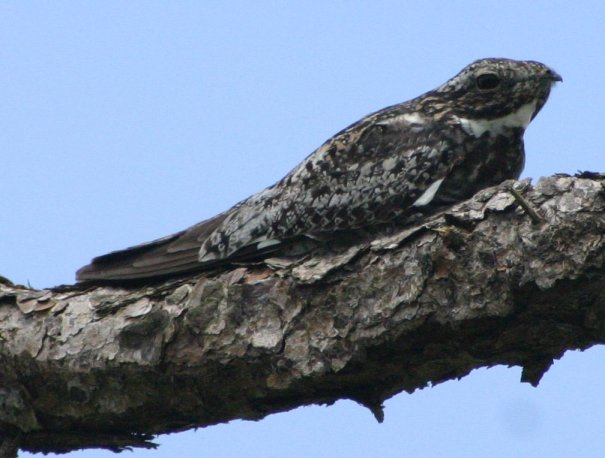
- Common nighthawk (Chordeiles minor)

Scientific classification
- Kingdom: Animalia
- Phylum: Chordata
- Class: Aves
- Order: Caprimulgiformes
- Family: Caprimulgidae
- Genus: Chordeiles; Swainson, 1832

Type species
- Caprimulgus virginianus Gmelin, JF, 1789=Camprimulgus minor Forster, JR, 1771

Synonyms
- Podager

= Chordeiles =

Genus of birds

Chordeiles is a New World genus of nighthawks in the nightjar family Caprimulgidae.

== Taxonomy ==
The genus Chordeiles was introduced in 1832 by the English zoologist William Swainson with Caprimulgus virginianus Gmelin, JF, 1789, as the type species. This is a junior synonym of Camprimulgus minor Forster, JR, 1771, the common nighthawk. The genus name is derived from Ancient Greek χορδή/khordē meaning "chord" and δείλη/deilē meaning "evening".

The genus contains the following six species:

Image	Scientific name	Common name	Distribution
	Chordeiles pusillus	Least nighthawk	northern South America
	Chordeiles rupestris	Sand-coloured nighthawk	Bolivia, Brazil, Colombia, Ecuador, Peru, and Venezuela
	Chordeiles minor	Common nighthawk	South America to northern North America.
	Chordeiles acutipennis	Lesser nighthawk	United States through South America
	Chordeiles gundlachii	Antillean nighthawk	the Greater Antilles, the Bahamas and the Florida Keys in the United States.
	Chordeiles nacunda	Nacunda nighthawk	Argentina, Bolivia, Brazil, Colombia, Ecuador, French Guiana, Guyana, Paraguay, Peru, Suriname, Trinidad and Tobago, Uruguay, and Venezuela
