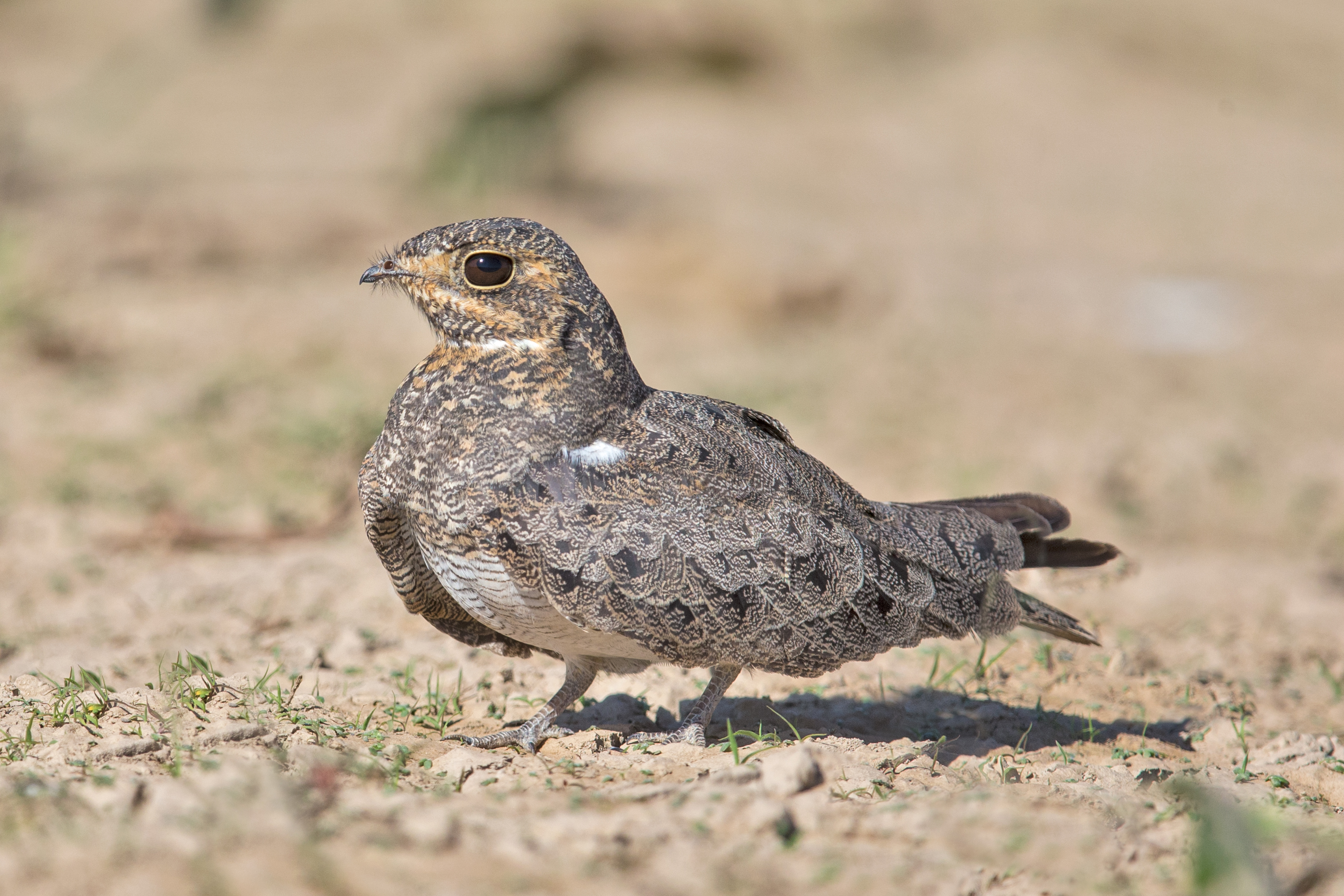

Conservation status
- Least Concern (IUCN 3.1)

Scientific classification
- Kingdom: Animalia
- Phylum: Chordata
- Class: Aves
- Order: Caprimulgiformes
- Family: Caprimulgidae
- Genus: Chordeiles
- Species: C. nacunda

Binomial name
- Chordeiles nacunda (Vieillot, 1817)

Synonyms
- Podager nacunda

= Nacunda nighthawk =

Species of bird

The nacunda nighthawk (Chordeiles nacunda) is a species of nightjar in the family Caprimulgidae. It is found in Argentina, Bolivia, Brazil, Chile, Colombia, Ecuador, French Guiana, Guyana, Paraguay, Peru, Suriname, Trinidad and Tobago, Uruguay, and Venezuela. Its natural habitats are dry savanna, subtropical or tropical seasonally wet or flooded lowland grassland, and heavily degraded former forest.

== Taxonomy ==
The nacunda nighthawk was formally described in 1817 by the French ornithologist Louis Vieillot under the binomial name Caprimulgus nacunda based on a specimen collected in Paraguay. The species was formerly placed in the monotypic genus Podager, but was moved into the genus Chordeiles based on the results of a 2010 molecular phylogenetic study. The former generic name podager originates from the Latin meaning "a man suffering from gout" and reflects the awkward walking manner of this nighthawk. The specific name nacunda is derived from the Guaraní word for a "big-mouth".

Genetic studies have shown that the Nacunda nighthawk is sister to the much smaller least nighthawk (Chordeiles pusillus).

Two subspecies are recognised:

- C. n. coryi Agne & Pacheco, 2011 – north, east Colombia and north Venezuela through Guyana and Suriname to north Brazil
- C. n. nacunda (Vieillot, 1817) – east Peru and central Brazil to central Argentina

== Description ==
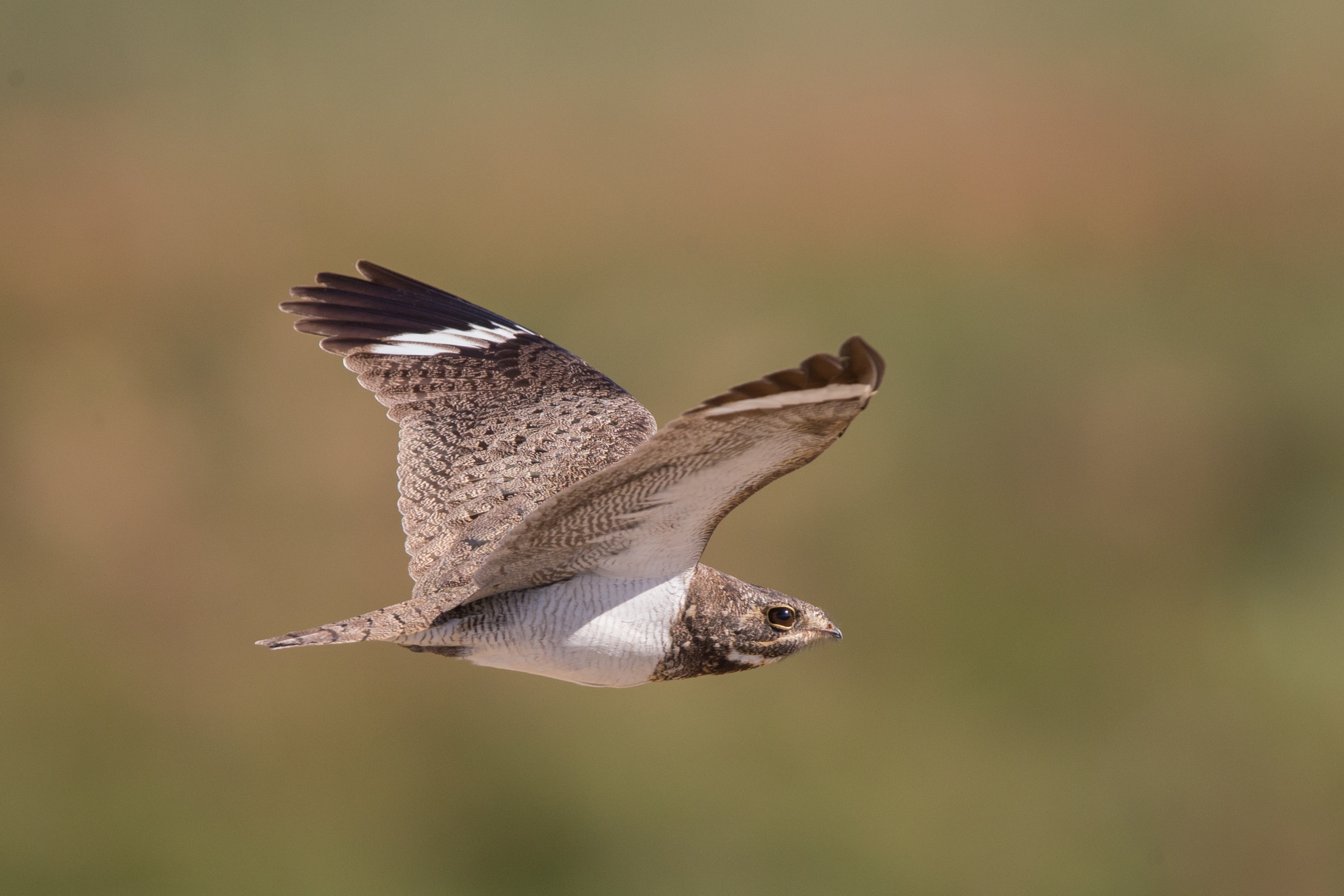
Nacunda nighthawk in flight

The nacunda nighthawk is not only the largest of the highly aerial nightjars known as nighthawks and the largest species of nightjar in the neotropics, it is one of the largest nightjar species in the world. Its length, at 27.5 to 32 cm (10.8 to 12.6 in), is somewhat less than the great eared-nightjar, which is typically considered the largest species in the family, but the nacunda may actually weigh a bit more on average. Six specimens of nacunda nighthawk were found to average 159 g (5.6 oz) in body mass, with range of 130 to 188 g (4.6 to 6.6 oz). Its very large size, large head, and pale body with highly contrasting black primaries make the nacunda nighthawk easy to identify.

This species is noteworthy for its partially diurnal habits. Though a capable aerial forager, the nacunda nighthawk spends a considerable amount of time on the ground; it has notably long tarsi for a nightjar, and is more likely than other species to be seen standing on the ground, rather than resting on the surface.
