= Robert K. Selander =

American evolutionary biologist (1927–2015)

Robert Keith Selander (July 21, 1927 – June 14, 2015) was an American evolutionary biologist and emeritus professor at Pennsylvania State University. Known for his studies of molecular genetics, he was elected to the National Academy of Sciences in 1982.
