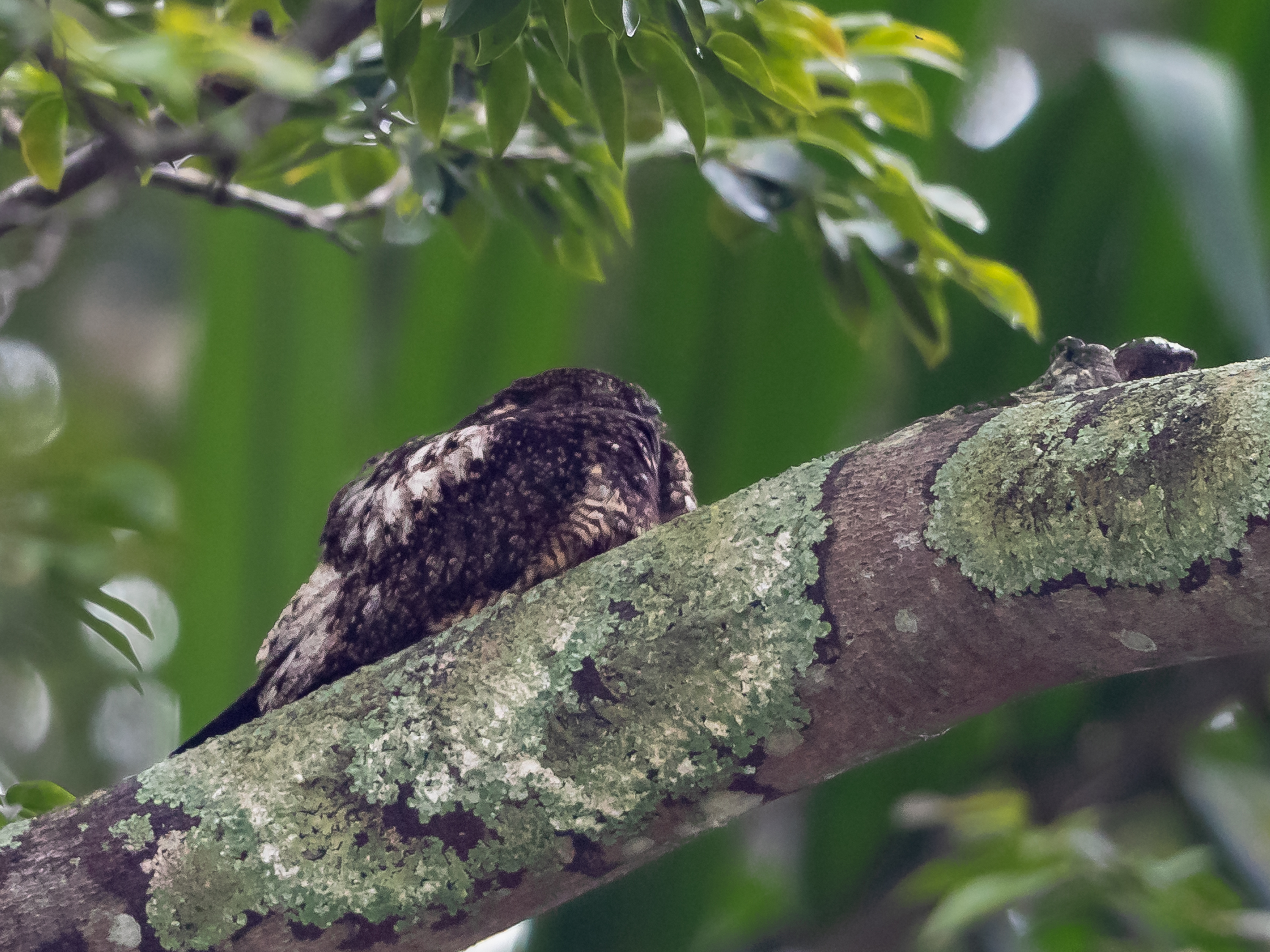

Conservation status
- Least Concern (IUCN 3.1)

Scientific classification
- Domain: Eukaryota
- Kingdom: Animalia
- Phylum: Chordata
- Class: Aves
- Clade: Strisores
- Order: Caprimulgiformes
- Family: Caprimulgidae
- Genus: Lurocalis
- Species: L. semitorquatus

Binomial name
- Lurocalis semitorquatus (Gmelin, JF, 1789)
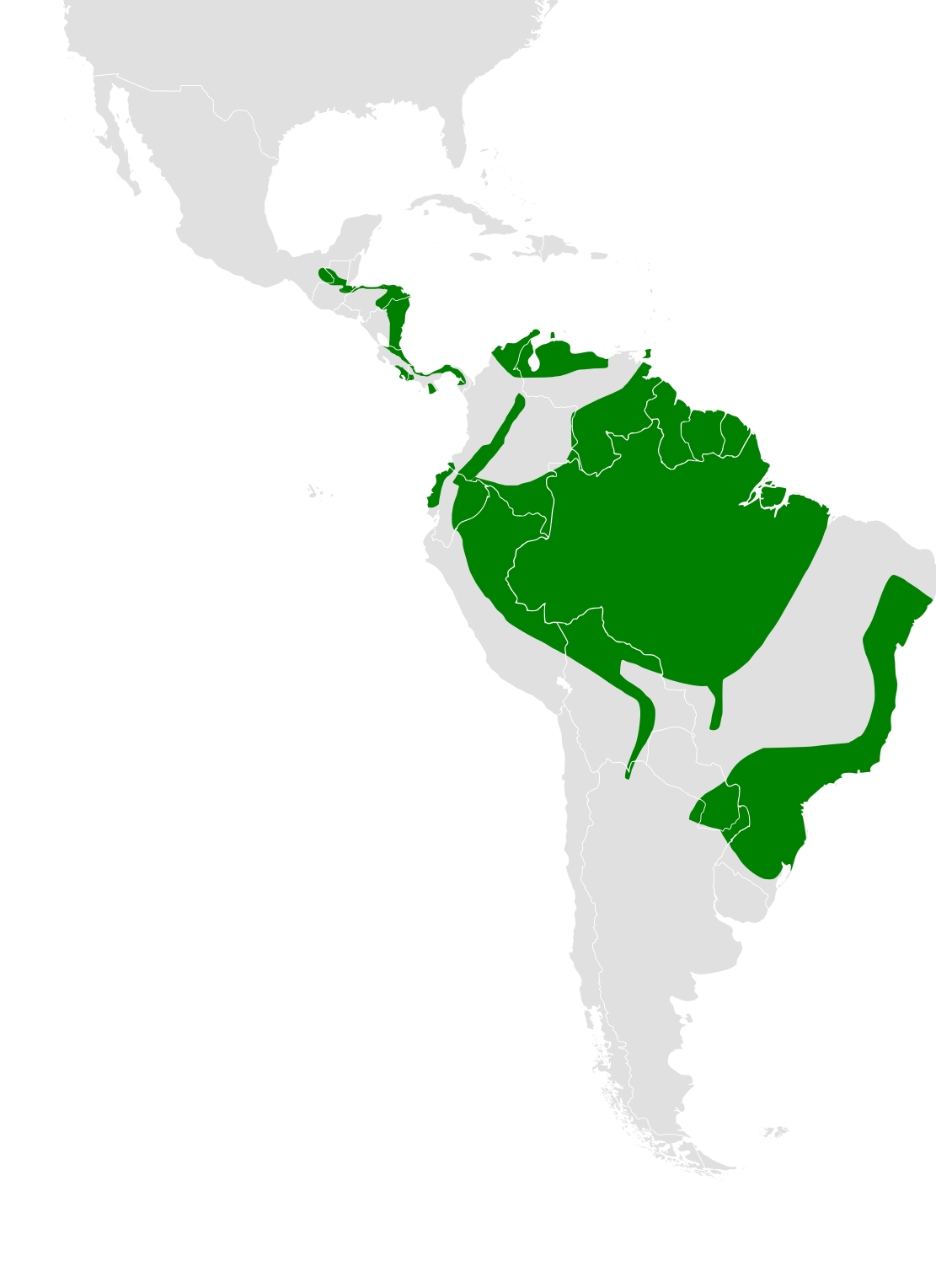
- Approximate range map of short-tailed nighthawk

= Short-tailed nighthawk =

Species of bird

The short-tailed nighthawk (Lurocalis semitorquatus) is a species of nightjar in the family Caprimulgidae. It is found in Mexico, in every Central American country except El Salvador, in Trinidad and Tobago, and in every mainland South American country except Chile and Uruguay.

== Taxonomy ==
The short-tailed nighthawk was formally described in 1789 by the German naturalist Johann Friedrich Gmelin in his revised and expanded edition of Carl Linnaeus's Systema Naturae. He placed it with all the nightjars in the genus Caprimulgus and coined the binomial name Caprimulgus semitorquatus. Gmelin based his description on "Le petit egoulevent tacheté de Cayenne" that had been described in 1779 by the French polymath Georges-Louis Leclerc, Comte de Buffon in his Histoire Naturelle des Oiseaux. A hand-coloured plate was published separately. The short-tailed nighthawk is now placed with the rufous-bellied nighthawk in the genus Lurocalis that was introduced in 1851 by the American ornithologist John Cassin. The genus name combines the Ancient Greek oura meaning "tail" with kolos meaning "stunted". The specific epithet semitorquatus combines the Latin semi- meaning "half-" or "small" with torquatus meaning "collared".

Four subspecies are recognised:

- L. s. stonei Huber, 1923 – southeast Mexico to northwest Ecuador
- L. s. semitorquatus (Gmelin, JF, 1789) – north Colombia to the Guianas and north Brazil, Trinidad and Tobago
- L. s. schaeferi Phelps & Phelps Jr, 1952 – Aragua (north Venezuela)
- L. s. nattererii (Temminck, 1822) – Amazonia south of the Amazon to north Argentina

Subspecies L. s. nattereri has been suggested as a separate species, but genetic data confirm its present status. A previously recognized subspecies, L. s. noctivagus, was merged into L. s. stonei. The rufous-bellied nighthawk (L. rufiventris) was formerly treated as a subspecies of short-tailed nighthawk, and the two of them are the only members of genus Lurocalis.

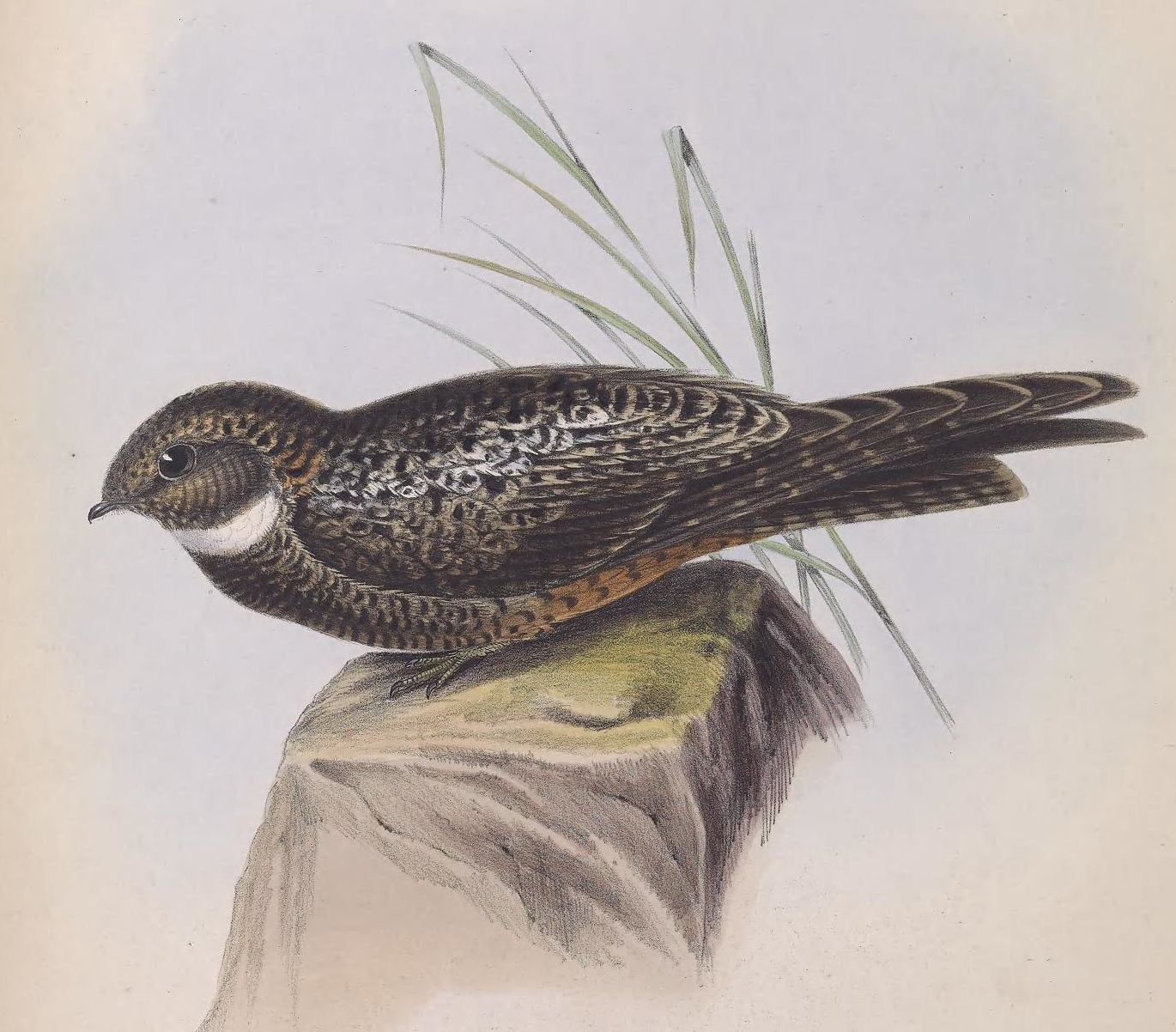
Illustration by David William Mitchell from George Robert Gray's Genera of Birds 1844–1849

== Description ==
The short-tailed nighthawk is 19 to 21 cm (7.5 to 8.3 in) long. One L. s. semitorquatusfemale weighed 79 g (2.8 oz) and several L. s. nattereri males weighed 82 to 89 g (2.9 to 3.1 oz). This is a rather large nightjar with an unusually short tail. Its upperparts are dark brown to blackish with rufous and buff spots and speckles. The wings are also dark brown with muted spots of several colors, an unlike most other nighthawks, do not have bold white markings. The tail is brown with tawny or grayish bars and a narrow buffy or whitish band at the end. The chin is dark brown, the throat white, the upper breast dark brown with lighter speckles, the lower breast buff with brown bars, and the belly and flanks tawny buff with brown bars. The subspecies differ somewhat in size and in the extent and intensity of the spots, speckles, and bars that overlay the ground color.

The most common vocalization varies slightly among subspecies, and has been described as a "constantly repeated but well-spaced ewIT ... ewIT ... ewIT ..." (L. s. nattereri) and "a sharp, slightly liquid g'wik or gweek" (L. s. stonei). It is given both when perched and in flight.

== Distribution and habitat ==
The short-tailed nighthawk is widely distributed across Central and northern South America. It primarily inhabits lowland evergreen forest but also is found in more open landscapes such as clearings, river edges, old cacao plantations, and middle-aged secondary forest.

The northern populations are generally resident though the seasonal distribution of subspecies in Amazonia is not well known. The southerly ones are migratory and may move as far north as Venezuela during the austral winter.

== Behavior ==
=== Feeding ===
The short-tailed nighthawk is an aerial insectivore that forages mostly at dusk. Though its diet has not been studied in detail it is known to include beetles and true bugs. It is usually seen singly or in pairs but sometimes forages in small flocks. Its flight is "rapid and erratic" and has been compared to a bat's. It roosts in trees, lengthwise on a thick branch.

=== Breeding ===
The short-tailed nighthawk, with its former subspecies the rufous-bellied nightjar, are the only members of their family known to nest in trees. It lays its single egg on a large horizontal branch without using any added material.

== Status ==
The IUCN has assessed the short-tailed nighthawk as being of Least Concern. It has a large range and a large population, though the latter is thought to be decreasing. No threats other than local deforestation have been identified.
