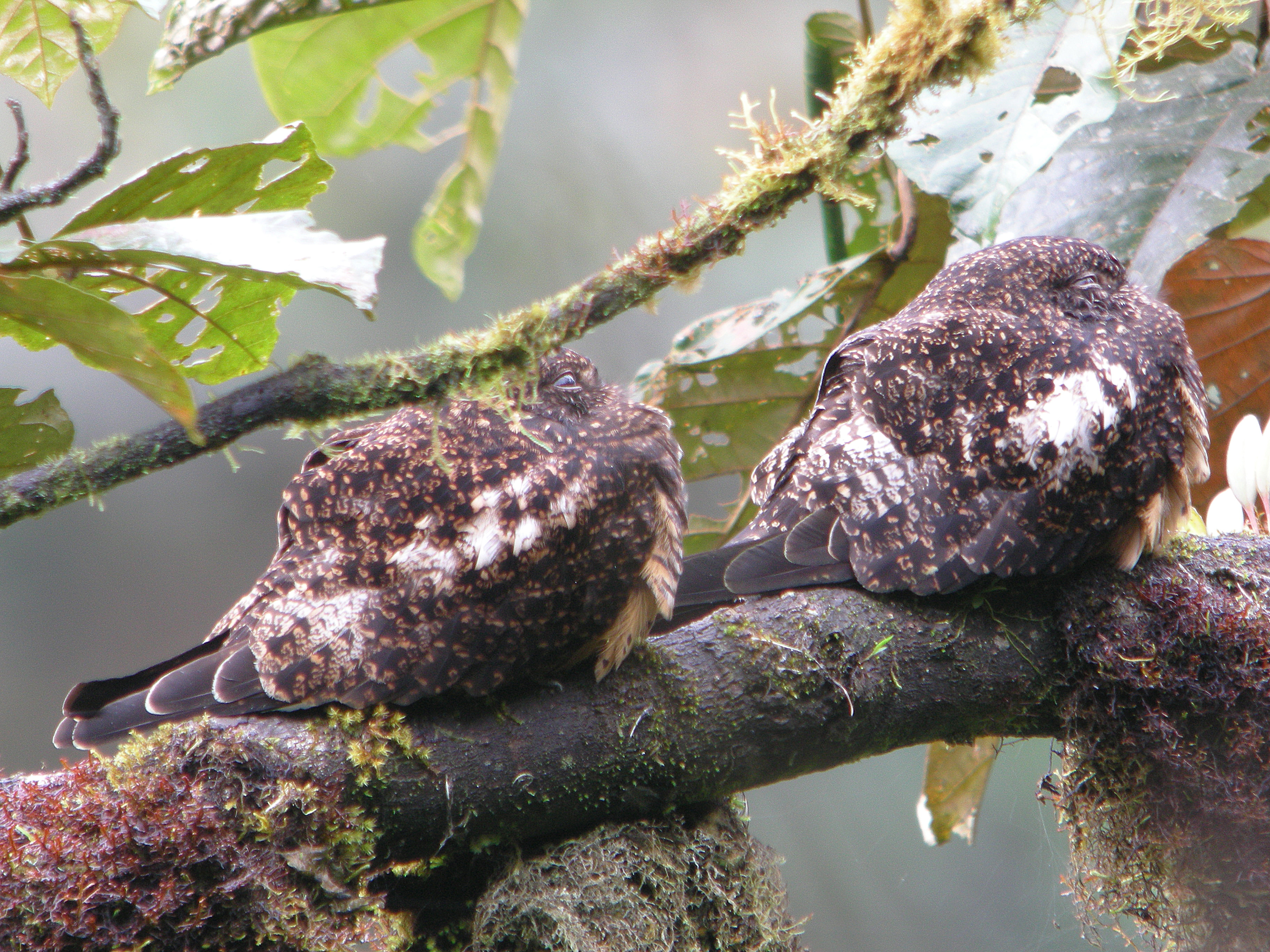

Conservation status
- Least Concern (IUCN 3.1)

Scientific classification
- Domain: Eukaryota
- Kingdom: Animalia
- Phylum: Chordata
- Class: Aves
- Clade: Strisores
- Order: Caprimulgiformes
- Family: Caprimulgidae
- Genus: Lurocalis
- Species: L. rufiventris

Binomial name
- Lurocalis rufiventris Taczanowski, 1884

= Rufous-bellied nighthawk =

Species of bird

The rufous-bellied nighthawk (Lurocalis rufiventris), sometimes also Taczanowski's nighthawk, is a species of nightjar in the family Caprimulgidae. It is found in Bolivia, Colombia, Ecuador, Peru, and Venezuela.

== Taxonomy and systematics ==
The rufous-bellied nighthawk was described as a species, later was treated as a subspecies of short-tailed nighthawk (Lurocalis semitorquatus), but since at least the late 1990s has been again accepted as a species in its own right. It is monotypic.

== Description ==
The rufous-bellied nighthawk is 23 to 25 cm (9.1 to 9.8 in) long. Its uppersides and wings are dark brown with rufous and buff spots and speckles. The tail is brown with tawny or grayish brown bars and a pale tip. The chin is dark brown, the throat white, the breast dark brown, and the belly and flanks tawny buff.

== Distribution and habitat ==
The rufous-bellied nighthawk is found in the Andes of western Venezuela, the eastern and central Andes of Colombia, the west side of much of the Ecuadoran Andes, and the east side of the Andes through Ecuador and Peru into Bolivia. It inhabits humid montane cloudforest, in at least Ecuador and Peru at elevations between 1,500 and 3,450 m (4,900 and 11,000 ft).

== Behavior ==
The rufous-bellied nighthawk is usually found singly or in pairs. It is most active at dusk, and during the day roosts lengthwise on tree branches.

=== Feeding ===
The rufous-bellied nighthawk feeds on the wing; though its diet has not been studied it is assumed to be insects.

=== Breeding ===
The rufous-bellied nighthawk's breeding phenology has not been studied. It is assumed to be similar to that of its congener, the short-tailed nighthawk, which lays its one egg directly on a horizontal branch.

=== Vocalization ===
The rufous-bellied nighthawk's song, "a rapidly delivered series of notes that gradually descend in pitch, e.g., kwa-kwa-kwa-kwa-ko", is given both in flight and while perched. It has other vocalizations, "a muffled pow, a series of muffled rising coos, and a low growl".

== Status ==
The IUCN has assessed the rufous-bellied nighthawk as being of Least Concern. It has a large range, and though its population is believed to be declining, the rate of decline is not thought to be fast enough for a more serious rating. No immediate threats other than habitat destruction have been identified.
