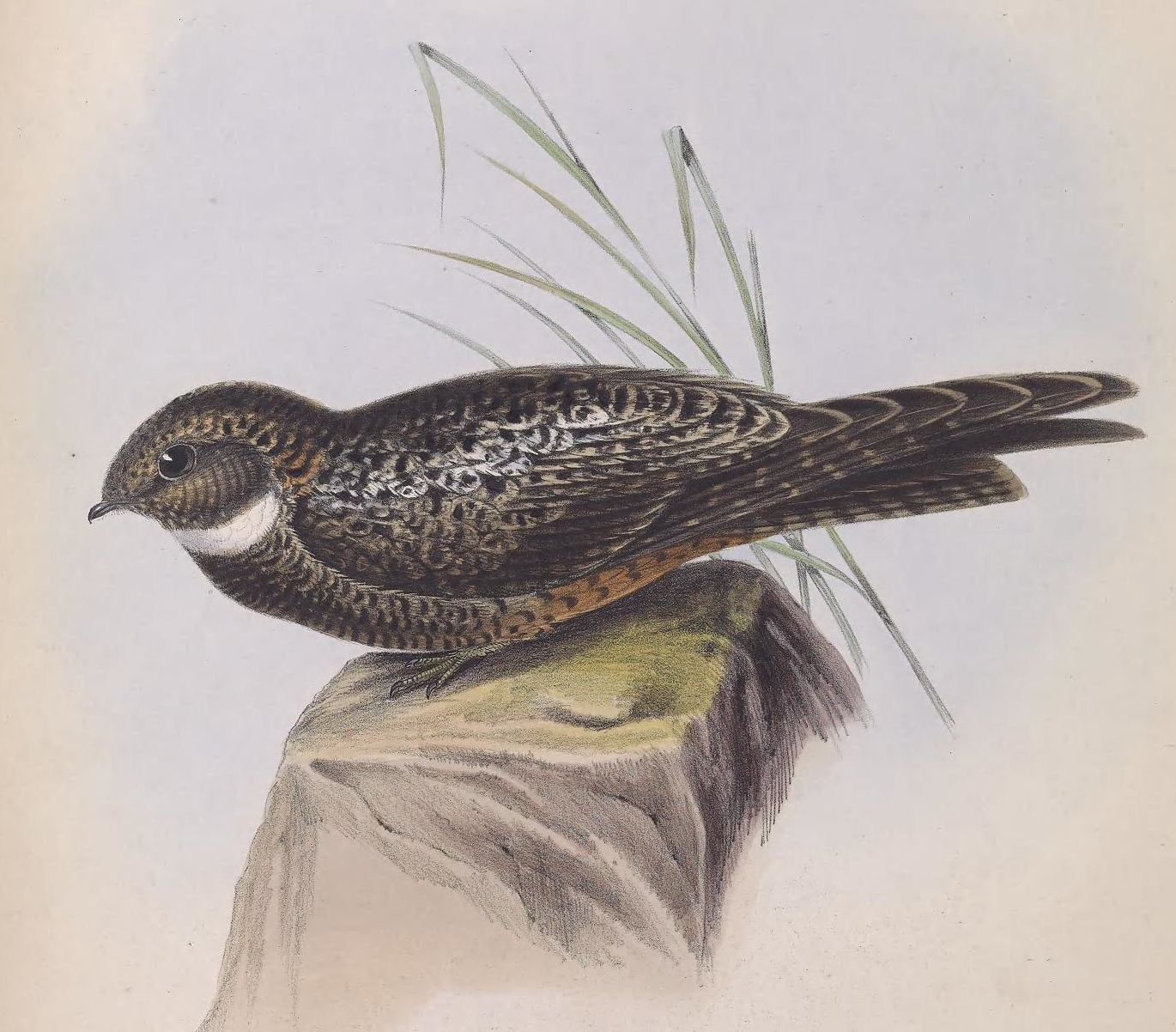

Scientific classification
- Kingdom: Animalia
- Phylum: Chordata
- Class: Aves
- Order: Caprimulgiformes
- Family: Caprimulgidae
- Genus: Lurocalis; Cassin, 1851

Type species
- Caprimulgus nattereri (short-tailed nighthawk) Temminck, 1822

= Lurocalis =

Genus of birds

Lurocalis is a genus of nightjars in the family Caprimulgidae. The species are found in Central and South America.

== Taxonomy ==
The genus Lurocalis was introduced in 1851 by the American ornithologist John Cassin. The type species was designated as Caprimulgus nattereri Temminck, 1822, by George Robert Gray in 1855. This taxon is now considered as a subspecies of the short-tailed nighthawk. The genus name combines the Ancient Greek oura meaning "tail" with kolos meaning "stunted".

The genus contains two species.

Image	Scientific name	Common name	Distribution
	Lurocalis rufiventris Taczanowski, 1884	Rufous-bellied nighthawk	Bolivia, Colombia, Ecuador, Peru, and Venezuela
	Lurocalis semitorquatus (Gmelin, 1789)	Short-tailed nighthawk	Argentina, Belize, Bolivia, Brazil, Colombia, Costa Rica, Ecuador, French Guiana, Guatemala, Guyana, Honduras, Mexico, Nicaragua, Panama, Paraguay, Peru, Suriname, Trinidad and Tobago, and Venezuela.
