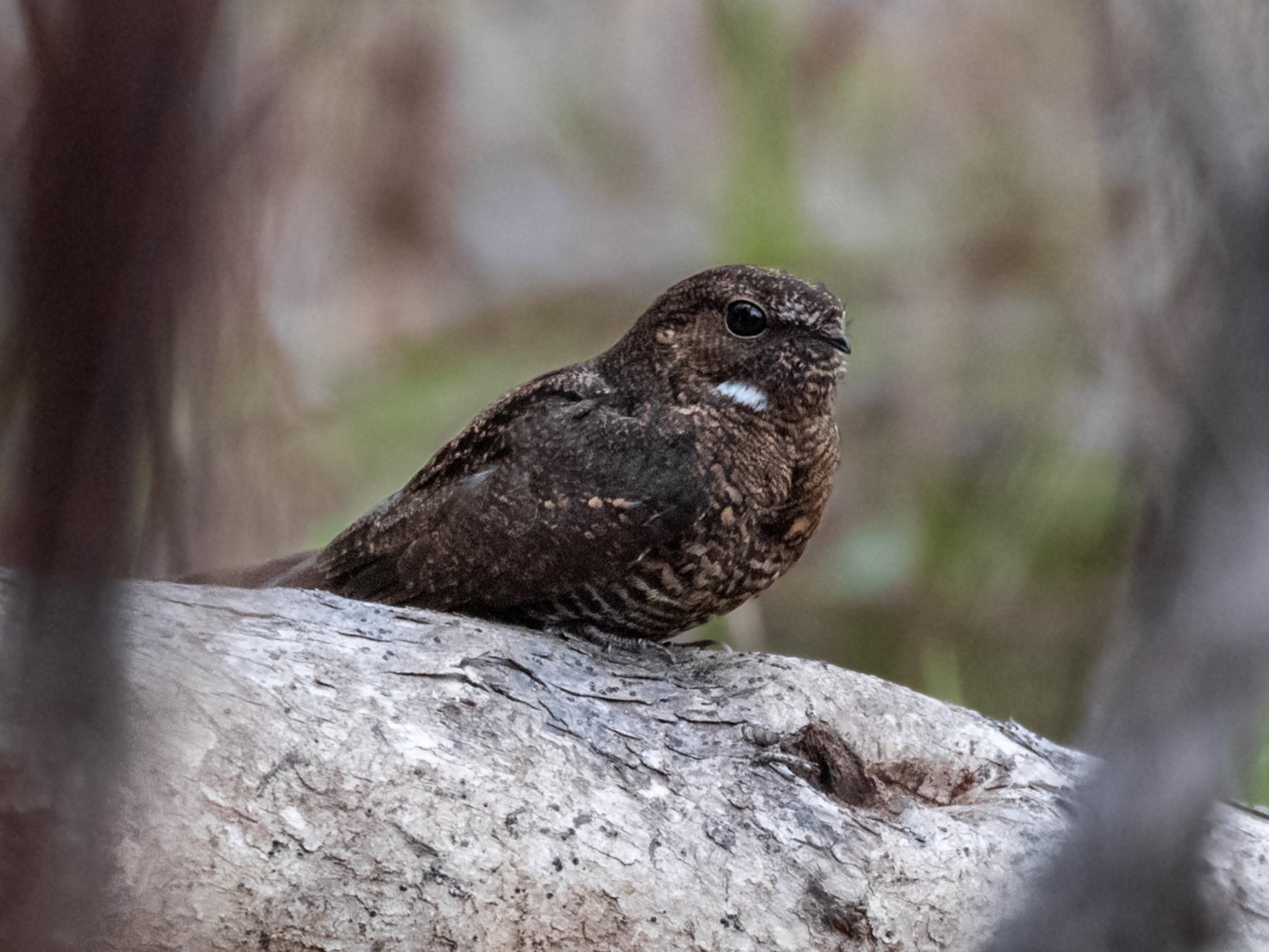
- Nyctiprogne leucopyga at Arari, Maranhão, Brazil

Conservation status
- Least Concern (IUCN 3.1)

Scientific classification
- Kingdom: Animalia
- Phylum: Chordata
- Class: Aves
- Order: Caprimulgiformes
- Family: Caprimulgidae
- Genus: Nyctiprogne
- Species: N. leucopyga

Binomial name
- Nyctiprogne leucopyga (Spix, 1825)

= Band-tailed nighthawk =

Species of bird

The band-tailed nighthawk (Nyctiprogne leucopyga) is a species of nightjar in the family Caprimulgidae. It is widely spread throughout northern and central South America. Five subspecies are recognised. They are nocturnal birds that feed on flying insects. As with almost all nightjars, they lay their eggs directly on the ground and rely their camouflaged plumage to avoid predation.

== Taxonomy ==
The band-tailed nighthawk was formally described and illustrated in 1825 by the German naturalist Johann Baptist von Spix under the binomial name Caprimulgus leucopygus. Spix specified the habitat as the wooded shores of the Amazon. The specific epithet is derived from Ancient Greek λευκοπυγος/leukopugos meaning "with white rear", from λευκος/leukos meaning "white" and -πυγος/-pugos meaning "-rumped". The band-tailed nighthawk is now placed together with the plain-tailed nighthawk in the genus Nyctiprogne that was introduced in 1847 by the French naturalist Charles Lucien Bonaparte.

=== Subspecies ===
There are 5 recognized subspecies which differ in size, colour and vocalizations. The subspecies N. l. latifascia has been suggested to be a separate species. It is visually distinct from the other subspecies, as its plumage is darker in colour, and there are differences in its vocalizations.

- N. l. exigua Friedmann, 1945 – east Colombia and south Venezuela. Smaller and has darker that the nominate.
- N. l. pallida Phelps, WH & Phelps, WH Jr, 1952 – northeast Colombia and west, central Venezuela. Paler upperparts than the nominate.
- N. l. leucopyga (Spix, 1825) – east Venezuela, the Guianas and north Brazil
- N. l. latifascia Friedmann, 1945 – extreme south Venezuela
- N. l. majuscula Pinto & Camargo, 1952 – northeast Peru, north, east Bolivia and west, central Brazil. Largest of the subspecies, paler with white underparts.

== Description ==
The band-tailed nighthawks is a small species, with a body length of 16.5 to 19 cm (6.5 to 7.5 in), and a wingspan of 12.9 to 14.1 cm (5.1 to 5.6 in). Adults weigh from 0.023 to 0.028 kg (0.051 to 0.062 lb). The female has a larger average weight and wingspan than the male.

The bill is very wide but short, with a length of 0.9 to 0.97 cm (0.35 to 0.38 in), and is hooked at the tip. It has cryptically patterned brown plumage, used to blend in with tree bark and leaves. Its wings are long with pointed wingtips, and have no white markings. It has a black bill, dark brown irises, and pinkish-gray tarsus and feet. The tarsus lengths are generally short, from 1.18 to 1.24 cm (0.46 to 0.49 in). Unlike many nightjar species, band-tailed nighthawks lack elongated rictal bristles. It has white patches on either side of the throat, and a white band on the mid-tail, across its three outermost tail feathers. The tail itself is short, and somewhat forked, at 8.2 to 9.7 cm (3.2 to 3.8 in).

It has very weak sexual dimorphism, with both sexes presenting similar plumage and colouring. The immature and juvenile phases are also similar to the mature adult, although are slightly more plain and paler.

== Distribution and habitat ==
The band-tailed nighthawk has a large range, although there are gaps in its distribution. It is located through much of the northern parts of South America, from east of the Andes to Venezuela and central Brazil. It is found from northern Venezuela and eastern Colombia, east to French Guiana and eastern Brazil. Its range then extends south to northern Bolivia and northeastern Paraguay. It is also found in Peru, Ecuador, and Guyana.

Its natural habitat is in subtropical and tropical areas located near water, along rivers, streams, marshes, and lakes. These habitats include lowland forests, savannahs, grasslands, and swamps. It is only reported in areas of elevation below 200 to 300m.

== Behaviour and ecology ==
The band-tailed nighthawk is a nocturnal species, and is the most active during the late evening, early morning, and at night. During the day, it roosts near the ground in locations with dense thickets of bushes and trees. The ecology and behaviour of this nighthawk is not well known, and there have been few dedicated studies

=== Breeding ===
Seasonal changes in the vocal activity of the band-tailed nighthawk has been used to determine the timing of its breeding season. The breeding season begins between July and August, when the maximum singing activity occurs, and the dry season ends. The nesting period occurs between September and October, when the wet season begins and there is a high amount of food availability. There is also less vocal activity measured during this nesting period.

The nest is a shallow hole on the ground, usually in open areas with little coverage, such as gravel beaches or forest floors. The nest is lined with leaves and other vegetation. The eggs are cream or white, with small dark blotches.

=== Feeding ===
The band-tailed nighthawk is an insectivore that feeds primarily on aerial arthropods, using a feeding method known as hawking. Its diet includes beetles, ants, true bugs, and flying termites, amongst other arthropods. It forages in continuous flight, with rapid, shallow wingbeats and gliding to keep it aloft. It feeds mostly at dusk, when there are high amounts of flying insects.

Feeding occurs around sunset and stops once it becomes too dark for the bird to see its prey, and then occurs once more just before dawn. In between feeding sessions, it roosts in the same area, on thin horizontal branches close to vegetation and water. The band-tailed nighthawk roosts perpendicular to the branch, either by itself or in groups of 2-10 individuals.

=== Vocalizations ===
Few vocalizations have been recorded for the band-tailed nighthawk. It has a gole-kwoik-kwak call that is at a similar pitch to a frog's ribbit, and is repeated steadily and at a low, subtle volume; it is considered a territorial call.

== Conservation and management ==
The IUCN Red List lists the status of the band-tailed nighthawk as of Least Concern. While Amazonian deforestation is predicted to cause a decrease in its population, it has a large geographic range and is a fairly common species.
