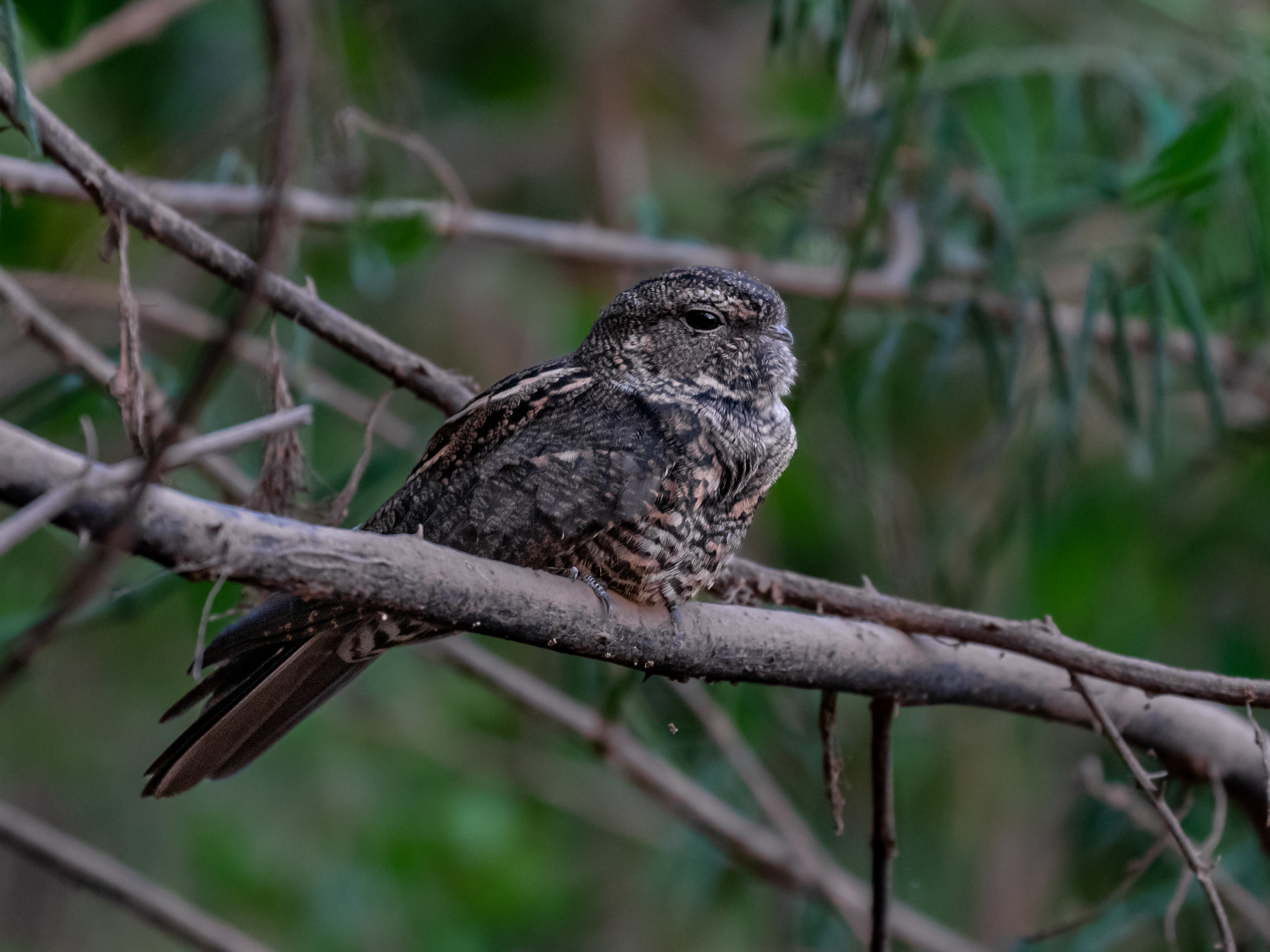

Conservation status
- Least Concern (IUCN 3.1)

Scientific classification
- Kingdom: Animalia
- Phylum: Chordata
- Class: Aves
- Clade: Strisores
- Order: Caprimulgiformes
- Family: Caprimulgidae
- Genus: Nyctiprogne
- Species: N. vielliardi

Binomial name
- Nyctiprogne vielliardi (Lencioni-Neto, 1994)

= Plain-tailed nighthawk =

Species of bird

The plain-tailed nighthawk (Nyctiprogne vielliardi) is a species of nightjar (probably least known of the nightjars) in the family Caprimulgidae. It is endemic to Brazil. Its natural habitat is dry savanna. It is threatened by habitat loss. The Plain-tailed was given its name due to the lack of bands on its tail. Other names it was given include "Bahia Nighthawk" and "Caatinga Nighthawk" although not completely inappropriate due to the fact that they are not only found specifically in those areas.

== Description ==
=== Physical ===
Once a plain-tailed nighthawk is fully grown, their plumage is dark with brown, the long upper-wings are black, it has gray and white in its upper parts and breast but the characteristic that distinguishes it from the band-tailed nighthawk is that its tail is black without

== Distribution and habitat ==
The Plain-tailed Nighthawks are only found in Brazil in only two currently known localities. One runs along the rio São Francisco and immediately adjacent tributaries in Bahia and in the state of Minas Gerais which are in central Brazil.

The Plain-tailed nighthawk can be classified as near threatened due to loss of riverine forest and scum which lie within its small range.

== Behavior ==
There is not much information about the Plain-tailed nighthawk because it is a newly identified species but it is known that they are crepuscular (active at dawn and dusk) and nocturnal (active at night) and they sleep on the ground where they can easily camouflage.

They have been observed above the river in flocks of up to 20 individuals during dusk hours.

=== Diet ===
A plain-tailed nighthawks diet consists mainly of insects which it finds in swarms. It also can catch a drink a water by swooping down slowly on a surface of water.

=== Nesting and Breeding ===
To attract females, the male Plain-tailed nighthawk sings. He also sings after he has marked his territory in order to protect it from intruders.

The Plain-tailed nighthawk does not construct nests but instead it lays its eggs in an unlined depression on the ground. They may lay about one to two eggs, but primarily two, that are a white/creamy color with dark colored spots in order to better camouflage with the ground. The female incubates the eggs during the day while both parents incubate it at night for approximately 19 to 21 days. The male is primarily in charge of protecting the nest from any predators or other intruders. the parents feed the chicks mainly insects until they are able to leave the nest in about 20 to 21 days.
