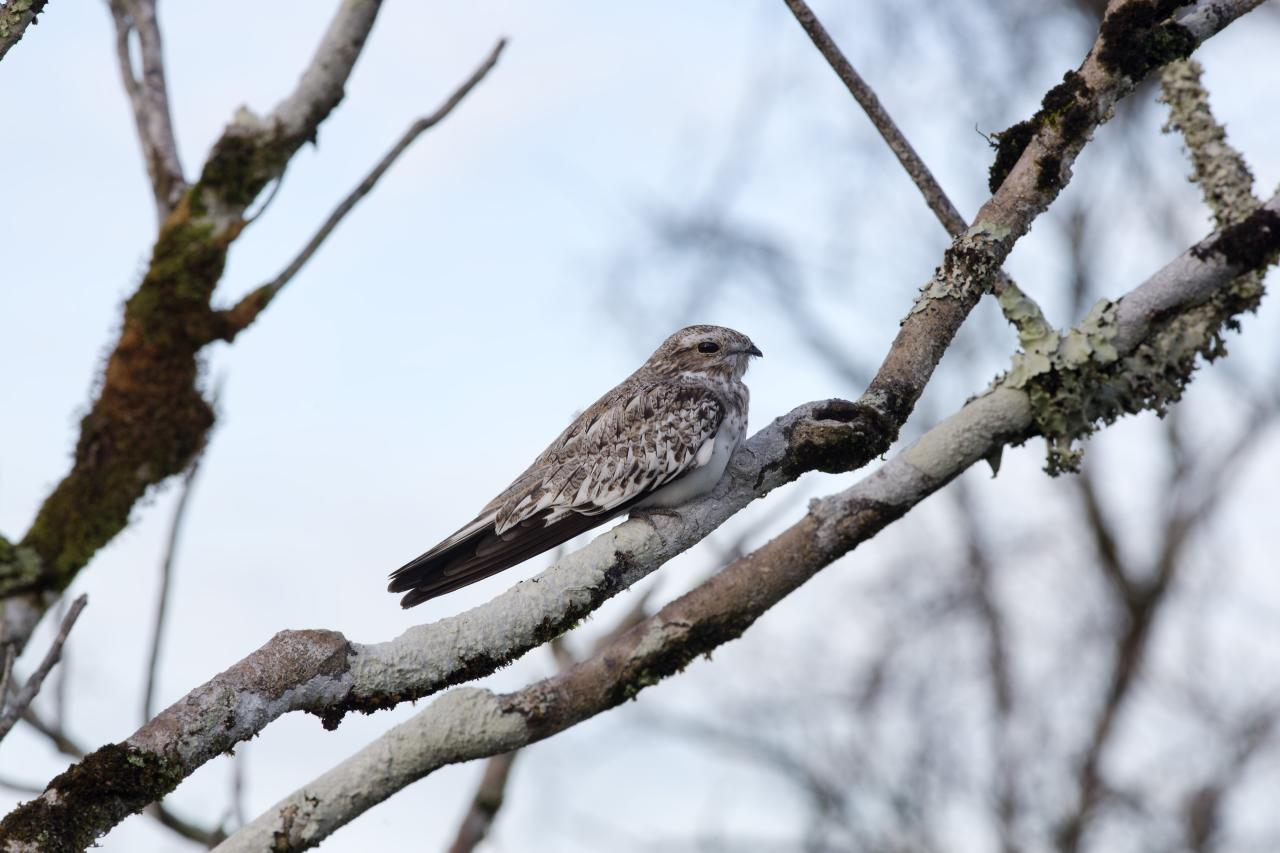
- In Ucayali Region, Peru

Conservation status
- Least Concern (IUCN 3.1)

Scientific classification
- Kingdom: Animalia
- Phylum: Chordata
- Class: Aves
- Order: Caprimulgiformes
- Family: Caprimulgidae
- Genus: Chordeiles
- Species: C. rupestris

Binomial name
- Chordeiles rupestris (Spix, 1825)

= Sand-coloured nighthawk =

Species of bird

The sand-colored nighthawk (Chordeiles rupestris) is a species of nightjar in the family Caprimulgidae. It is found in Bolivia, Brazil, Colombia, Ecuador, Peru, and Venezuela.

== Taxonomy and systematics ==
Major taxonomic systems recognize two subspecies of sand-colored nighthawk, the nominate Chordeiles rupestris rupestris and C. r. xylostictus. However, at least two authors contend it is better treated as monotypic.

== Description ==
The sand-colored nighthawk is 20.5 to 22 cm (8.1 to 8.7 in) long. Its upperparts are pale grayish brown with darker brown streaks, bars, and spots. The chin and throat are white to buffy white, the breast grayish white with a cinnamon tinge and brown bars and spots, and the belly white with brown spots on its upper part. The underside of the wing is also mostly white.

== Distribution and habitat ==
The nominate subspecies of sand-colored nighthawk is found widely in northwestern Amazonia of southeastern Colombia, southwestern Venezuela, northeastern Peru, and northwestern Brazil. It is also found more narrowly along river corridors in eastern Ecuador, Peru, northern Bolivia, and western Brazil. C. r. xylostictus is found only in Colombia's Cundinamarca Department. The species inhabits the western Amazon basin, primarily along watercourses but including oxbow lakes and grassy clearings such as airstrips. It is seldom found in areas above 500 m (1,600 ft) elevation.

== Behavior ==
The sand-colored nighthawk is crepuscular and nocturnal. During the day it roosts on river islands and sandbars, often in large numbers. In times of high water it will roost in trees overhanging the water.

=== Feeding ===
The sand-colored nighthawk forages very actively at dusk and then on and off during the night. Its diet has not been studied in detail but is known to be entirely insects. Its flight has been described as less erratic than that of other nightjars, with an "oddly mechanical"" flapping that resembles that of terns.

=== Breeding ===
The sand-colored nighhawk's breeding season spans from May through August in southeastern Peru and from June to September in central Brazil but has not been defined in the rest of its range. They nest in loose colonies, often near those of yellow-billed tern, large-billed tern, and black skimmer. They lay their clutch of two eggs in a scrape on a sandbar.

=== Vocalization ===
The sand-colored nighthawk apparently seldom sings, but it does so from the ground, "a gurgling purr...interspersed with quiet throat-clearing sound and loud grawh notes." It also makes a variety of other vocalizations when chasing another bird or defending a nest.

== Status ==
The IUCN has assessed the sand-colored nighthawk as being of Least Concern. It has a very large range, and though its population is believed to be declining, the rate of decline is not thought to be fast enough for a more serious rating. No immediate threats have been identified.
