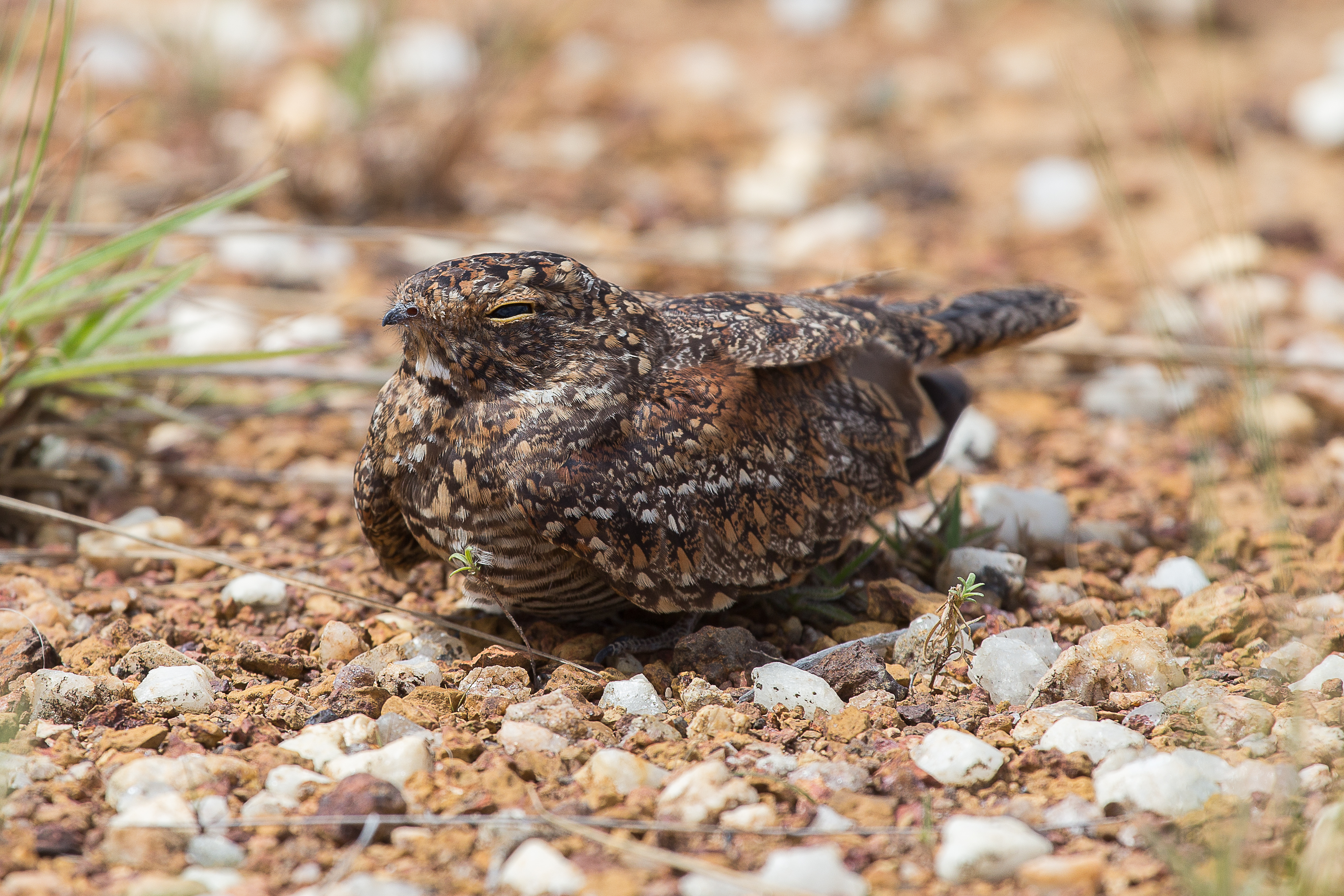

Conservation status
- Least Concern (IUCN 3.1)

Scientific classification
- Kingdom: Animalia
- Phylum: Chordata
- Class: Aves
- Order: Caprimulgiformes
- Family: Caprimulgidae
- Genus: Chordeiles
- Species: C. pusillus

Binomial name
- Chordeiles pusillus Gould, 1861
- Year-round Passage

= Least nighthawk =

Species of bird

The least nighthawk (Chordeiles pusillus) is a species of nightjar in the family Caprimulgidae. It is found in Argentina, Bolivia, Brazil, Colombia, Guyana, Suriname, and Venezuela.

== Taxonomy ==
The least nighthawk was formally described in 1861 by the English ornithologist John Gould based on a specimen collected in the Brazilian state of Bahia. Gould coined the current binomial name Chordeiles pusillus. The specific epithet is Latin meaning "tiny" or "very small". Early in the 20th century the least nighthawk was assigned to its own genus, Nannochordeiles, but since the middle of the century has been included in Chordeiles.

Six subspecies are recognised:

- C. p. septentrionalis (Hellmayr, 1908) – east Colombia through Venezuela and the Guianas
- C. p. esmeraldae Zimmer, JT & Phelps, WH, 1947 – southeast Colombia, south Venezuela and northwest Brazil
- C. p. xerophilus Dickerman, 1988 – Paraíba and Pernambuco (northeast Brazil)
- C. p. novaesi Dickerman, 1988 – Maranhão and Piauí (northeast Brazil)
- C. p. saturatus Pinto & Camargo, 1957 – east Bolivia and central west Brazil
- C. p. pusillus Gould, 1861 – Tocantins, Bahia and Goiás (east Brazil)

Two specimens from northeastern Argentina might represent a seventh subspecies.

== Description ==
The least nighthawk is 15 to 25 cm (5.9 to 9.8 in) long, making it one of the smallest species in family Caprimulgidae. Two females weighed 27.8 and 33.4 g (0.98 and 1.18 oz) The general plumage pattern is brown upperparts with gray, rufous, and buff spots, and whitish or buff underparts with brown bars. The throat has a narrow white patch or small white patches on either side of it. The four outermost primaries have a white band that is highly visible in flight. Males also have white tips on some other wing feathers. The subspecies vary in size, colors, and the extent of the barring on the underparts.

== Distribution and habitat ==
The least nighthawk is found in north and east South America. It inhabits open savanna or subtropical grassland, both cerrado and caatinga. In elevation it ranges from sea level up to about 1,000 m (3,300 ft). Some populations appear to be migratory but the data are inconclusive.

== Behavior ==
=== Feeding ===
The least nighthawk is an aerial insectivore, taking prey of many insect orders. It hunts at dawn and late in dusk and tends to stay near the ground. It hunts in solitary, in pairs, or in small loose groups. Its flight has been described as "buoyant, quick, and erratic with many sudden shifts in direction".

=== Breeding ===
Very little is known about the least nighthawk's breeding phenology. Its nesting season appears to vary within its range. It lays one egg directly on the ground.

=== Vocalization ===
The least nighthawk's flight call has been variously described as "a low churr and a weak nasal beep or week" and as "a short, sharp whit or bit". It sings from the ground or a bush, "a fast cur-cur-cur-curry (or chu-chu-chu-chu-chuEE).

== Status ==
The IUCN has assessed the least nighthawk as being of Least Concern. It has a wide distribution, its population is thought to be stable, and no threats have been identified.
