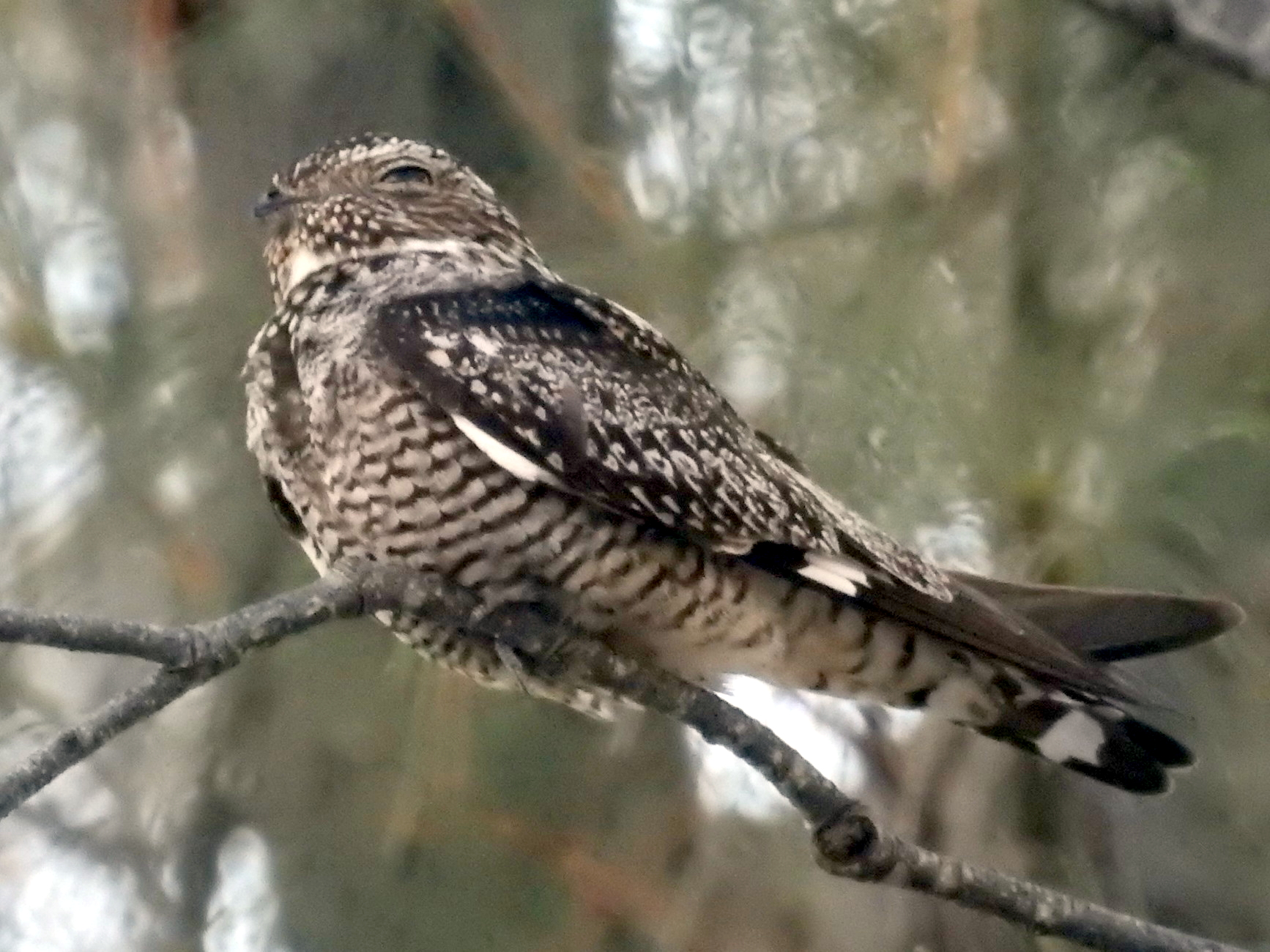

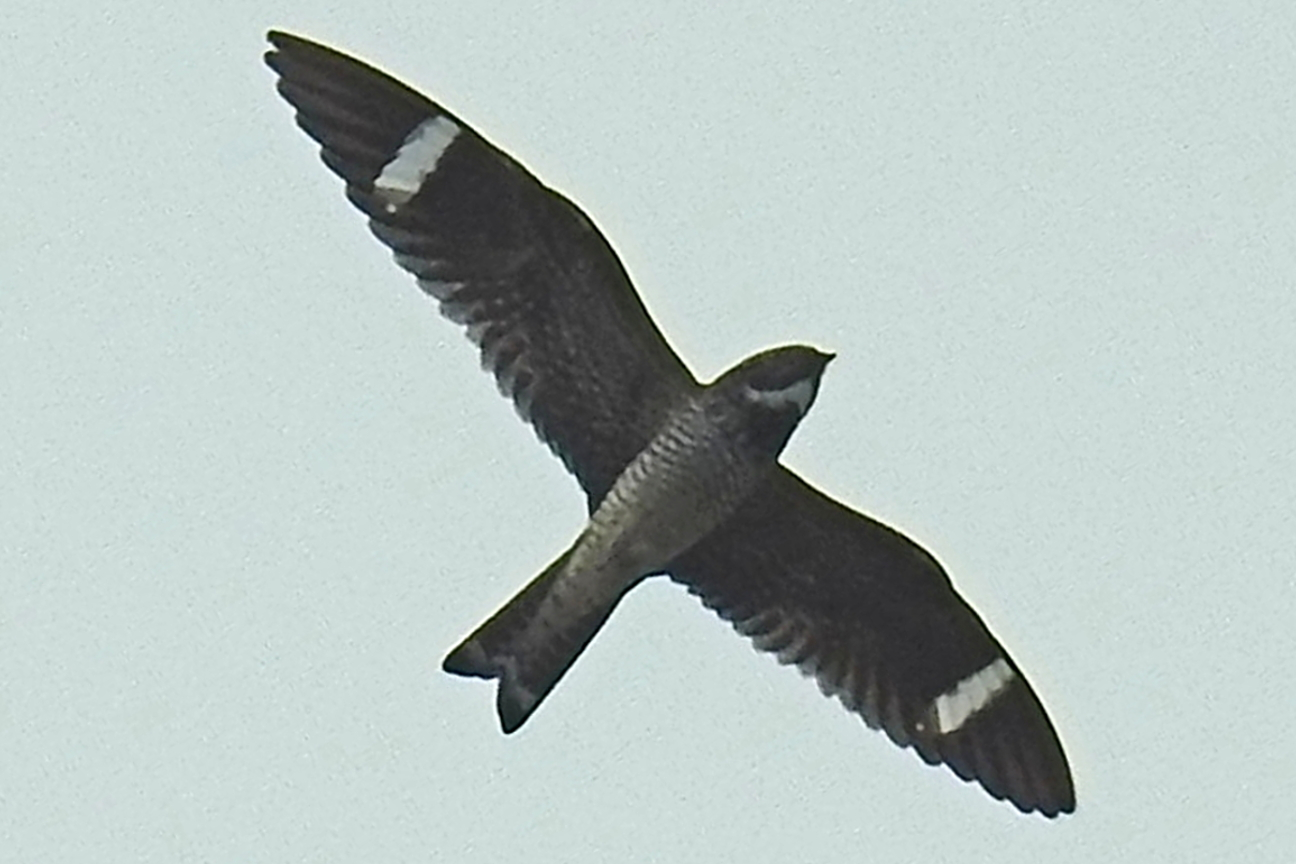

Conservation status
- Least Concern (IUCN 3.1)

Scientific classification
- Kingdom: Animalia
- Phylum: Chordata
- Class: Aves
- Order: Caprimulgiformes
- Family: Caprimulgidae
- Genus: Chordeiles
- Species: C. gundlachii

Binomial name
- Chordeiles gundlachii Lawrence, 1857

= Antillean nighthawk =

Species of bird

The Antillean nighthawk (Chordeiles gundlachii) is a nightjar native to the Caribbean, The Bahamas, and Florida Keys.

Its specific epithet, gundlachii, is in honor of Cuban naturalist Juan Gundlach.

== Description ==
The adults are dark with brown, grey and white patterning on the upperparts and breast; the long wings are black and show a white bar in flight. The tail is dark with white barring; the underparts are white with black bars. The adult male has a white throat; the female has a light brown throat. The most distinguishing characteristic to determine its identity from its closest relative the common nighthawk are the contrasting pale tertials near the back of the wings of a sitting bird. There are two color morphs, a gray and a rufous type. Like other nighthawks, this bird will display by flying upward with a distinctive call note, then diving, pulling out of the dive only a few feet from the ground. This creates a rush of air and distinctive sound.

== Habitat and distribution ==
Their breeding habitat is open country of the Greater Antilles, the Lesser Antilles, the Bahamas, and the Florida Keys in the United States. They usually nest on bare ground, sometimes in raised locations including stumps or gravel roofs. They especially favor recently cleared areas in forests, airport fields, cane fields and pastures. Little is known about migration habits, although there is some evidence of migration routes to North and Central South America.

== Breeding ==
The Antillean nighthawk migrates out of its breeding range after raising its young. It still remains unknown where the birds spend the winter. The two eggs are laid directly on bare ground - there is no nest. Incubation is performed largely by the female and lasts for about 20 days. Young fledge at about 20 days of age.

== Diet ==
They catch flying insects on the wing, mainly foraging near dawn and dusk (crepuscular) or sometimes at night with a full moon.

== Call ==
The call is a short pikadik usually heard overhead. The common nighthawk occasionally will make a similar call, but it is not as consistent. In the Dominican Republic, the bird is called querebebé; in Puerto Rico, the bird is called querequequé. Both are onomatopoeic terms which originate in Taíno.
