= National Museum (Malaysia) =

Museum in Kuala Lumpur, Malaysia

Coordinates: 3°08′15″N 101°41′15″E

- Muzium Negara موزيوم نݢارا
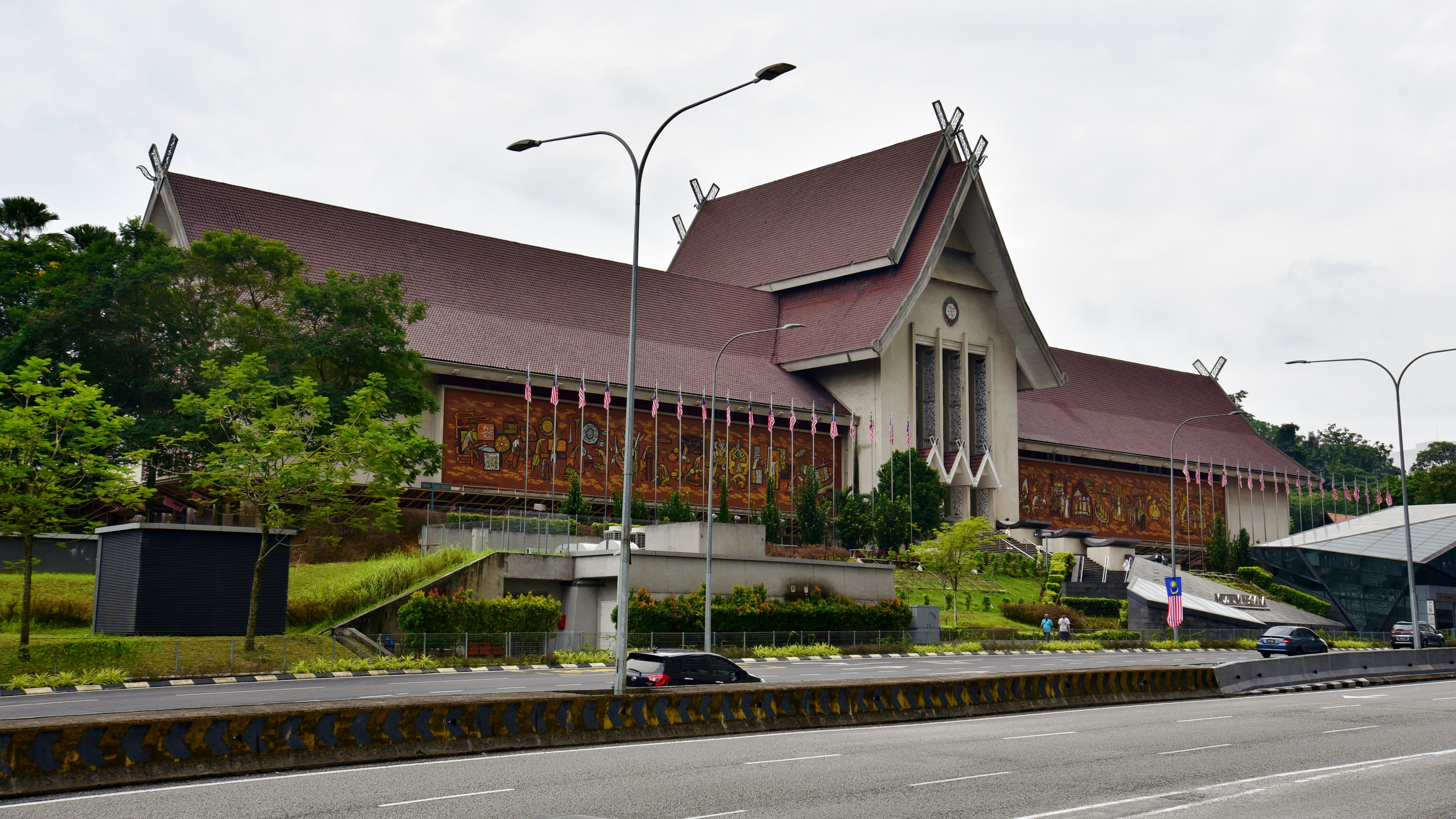
- National Museum in 2023
- Established: 1963
- Location: Jalan Damansara, Kuala Lumpur, Malaysia
- Type: National museum: Southeast Asian history; Malaysian culture; Ethnology
- Public transit access: KL Sentral (KTM Komuter, KJ Line and Monorail); Muzium Negara (SBK MRT)
- Website: www.muziumnegara.gov.my

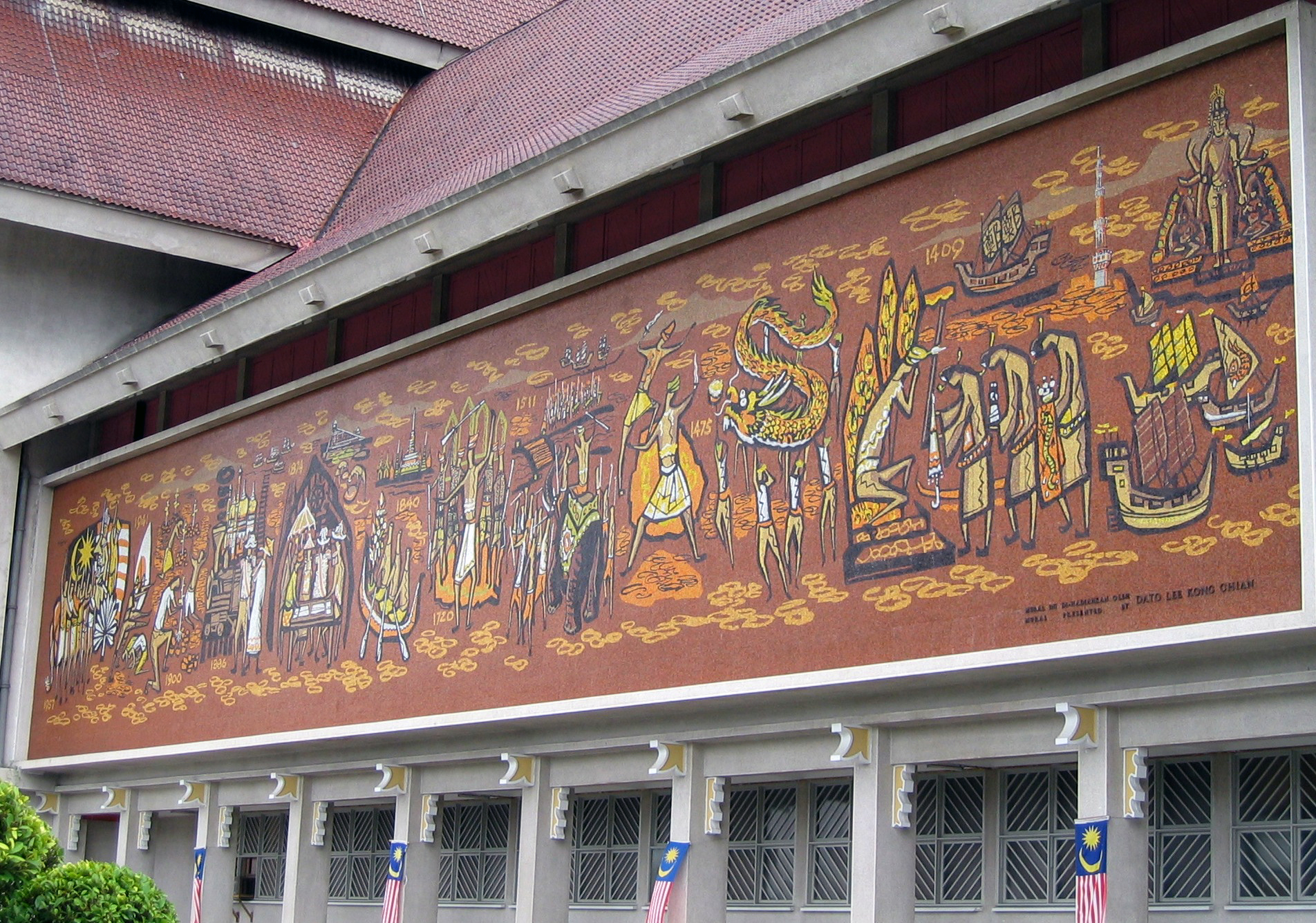
Frieze depicting Malaysian history at the National Museum

The National Museum (Malay: Muzium Negara) is a public museum in Kuala Lumpur, Malaysia dedicated to Malaysian art, culture, and history. Located on Jalan Damansara close to Perdana Lake Gardens across KL Sentral station. Its façade comprises elements from both traditional Malay and modern features. It was inaugurated on 31 August 1963.

The National Museum is a three-story structure, 109.7 metres (359 ft 11 in) long and 15.1 metres (49 ft 6 in) wide, which is 37.6 metres (123 ft 4 in) high at the central point. The museum houses four main galleries allotted to ethnology and natural history (geology). The displays range from free-standing tableaux showing cultural events like weddings, festivals and costumes; to traditional weapons, musical instruments, arts and crafts, ceramics, and flora and fauna.

== History ==
=== The Old Selangor Museum ===
Selangor Museum was the de facto national museum pre-independence. Selangor Museum was established in 1887 as an amateur affair by colonial civil servants. It was taken over by the colonial government, and following the formation of the Federated Malay States in 1896, in 1904 it was administratively merged with the Perak Museum in Taiping as the Federated Malay States Museums under director Leonard Wray Jr. A purpose-built museum building designed by prominent architect Arthur Benison Hubback opened in 1907.

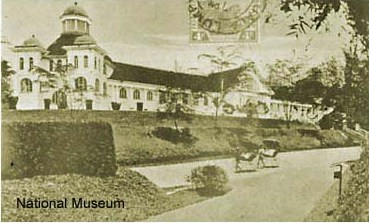
The old Selangor Museum

The Selangor Museum collection grew rapidly under curator, then director, Herbert Christopher Robinson. Other notable staff at Selangor Museum included Cecil Boden Kloss and Eibert Carl Henry Seimund. The museum also hired hunters and collectors from Sarawak, including Charles Ulok. Much of the museum collectors’ zoological field work focussed on the hills and mountains of the peninsula's central states, Fraser's Hill, Genting Highlands, Cameron Highlands, laying a foundation for the prominence of these hill resorts in Malaysia today. The museum had a major expedition to Gunung Tahan in 1905. They also collected in Southern Thailand and Indonesia. The expeditions and collections were written about in the Journal of the Federated Malay States Museums. Collected specimens were routinely transferred to the British Museum (Natural History), some were sent to Liverpool Museums in 1914, and the vertebrate collections were fully transferred from Selangor Museum to the Raffles Museum of Singapore in 1926.

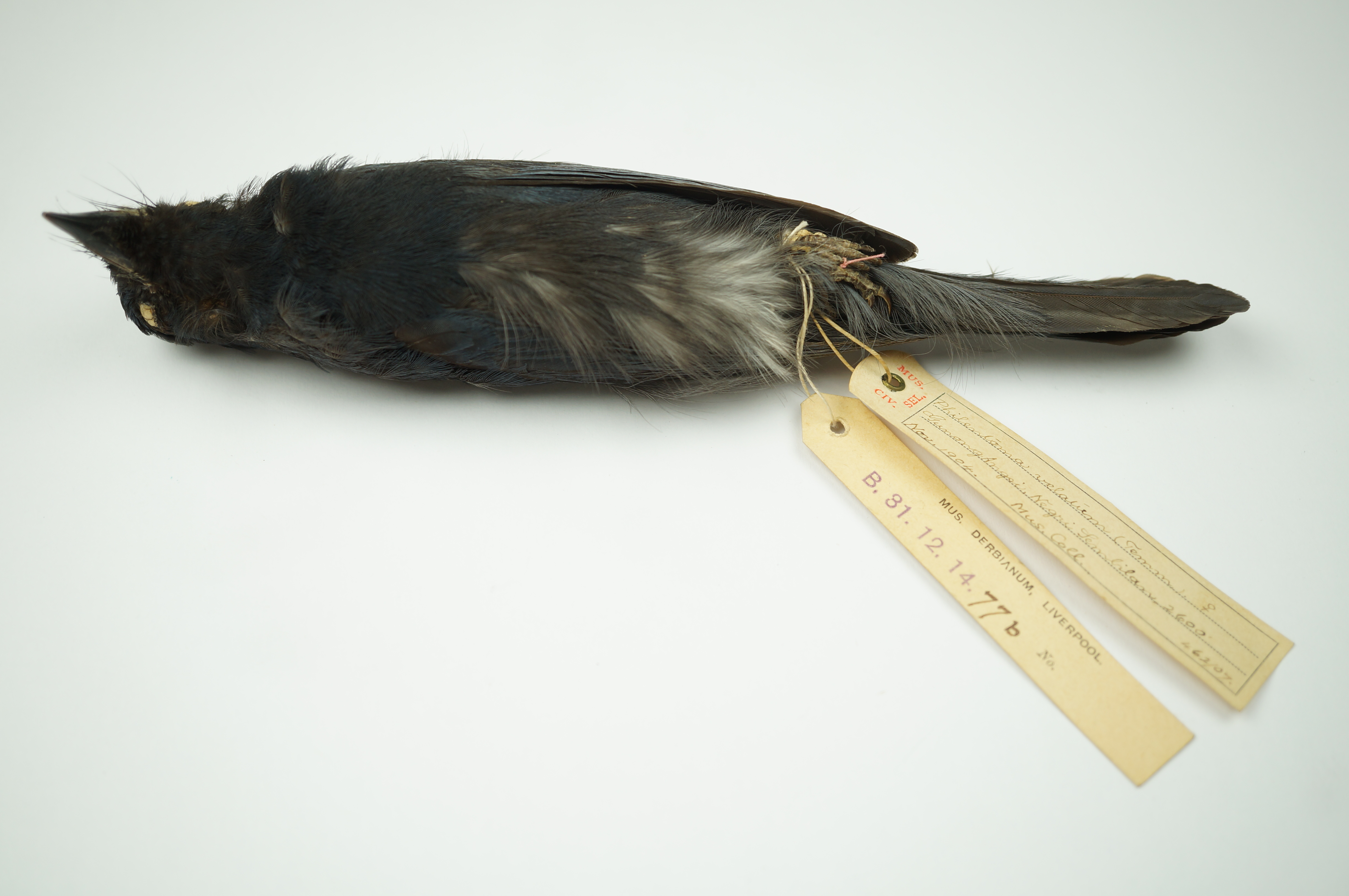
Maroon-breasted Philentoma with old Selangor Museum label.

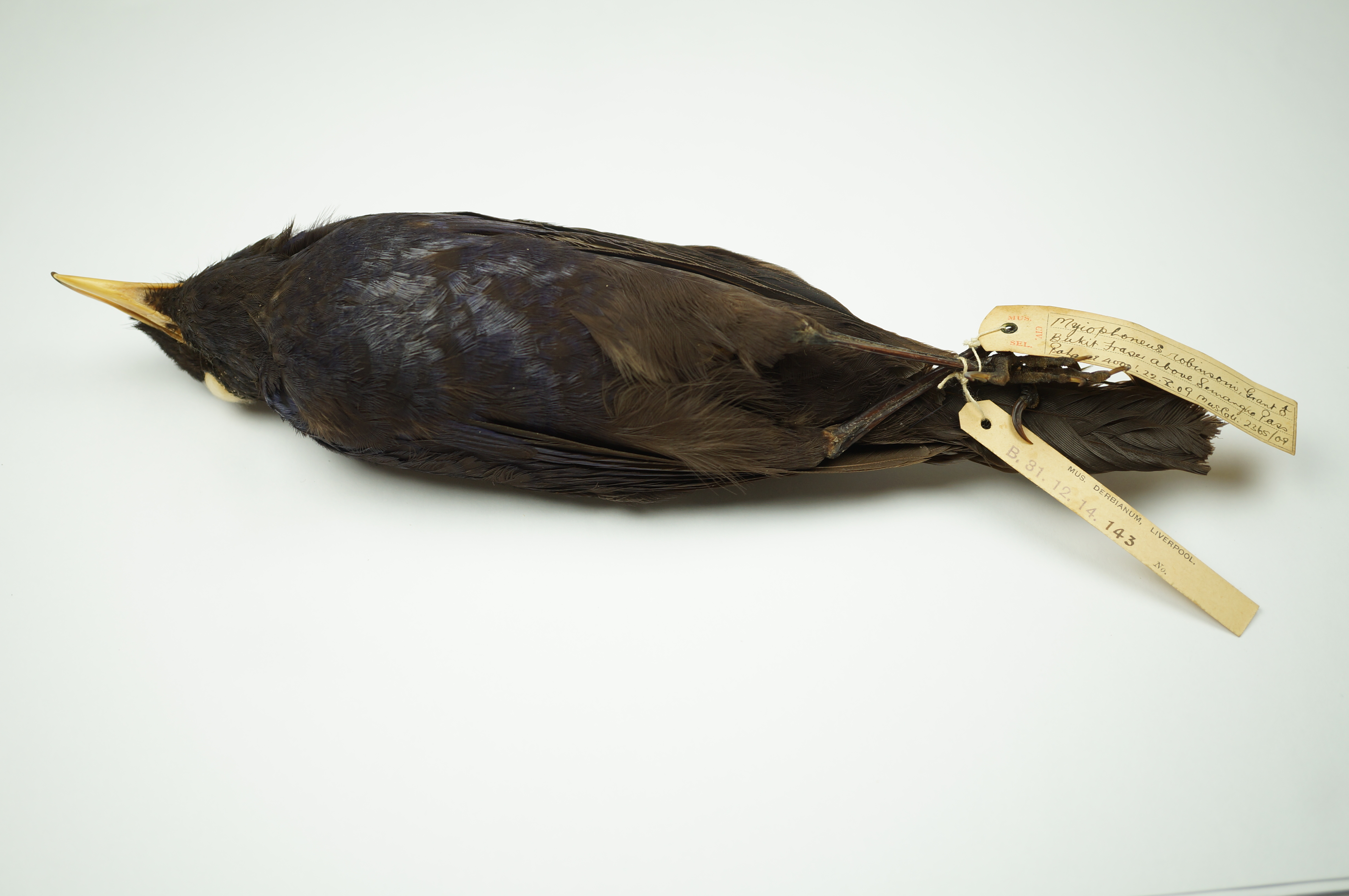
Malayan Whistling-thrush with old Selangor Museum label.

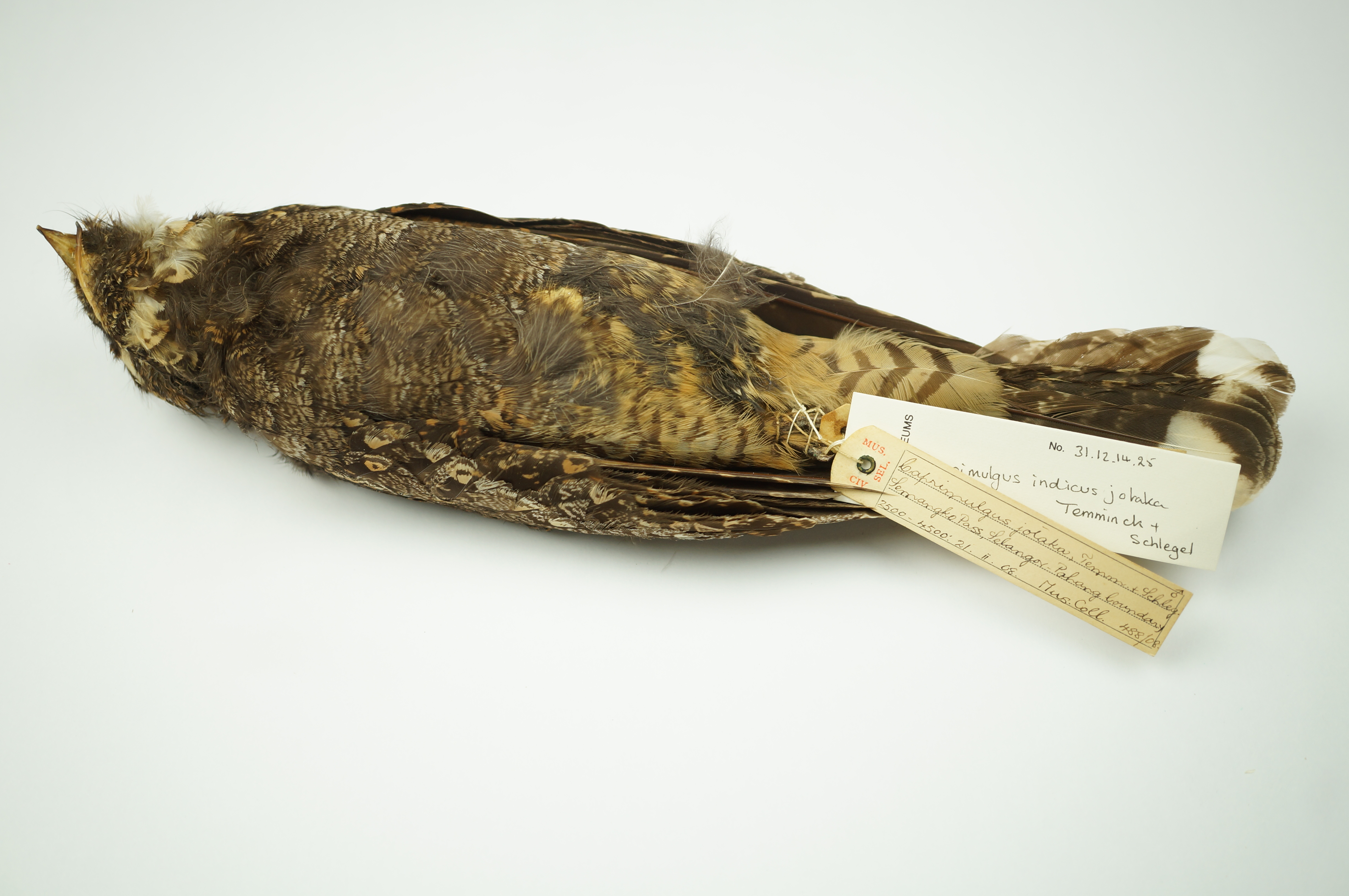
Grey Nightjar with old Selangor Museum label.

On 10 March 1945, during the end of World War II, the right wing of the museum was bombed and destroyed by the US B-29 bombers, from the Allied Forces. The remaining museum collection was then moved to the Perak Museum in Taiping.

After World War II, the left wing of Selangor Museum was still in use as a historical site. On the brink of independence of the Federation of Malaya, Prime Minister Tunku Abdul Rahman conceived the idea to build a museum to house national historical and cultural treasures as well as specimens of flora and fauna. The old museum structure was completely demolished to make way for the new museum. The new National Museum, Muzium Negara, was established on the site of the former Selangor Museum.

=== Design and construction ===
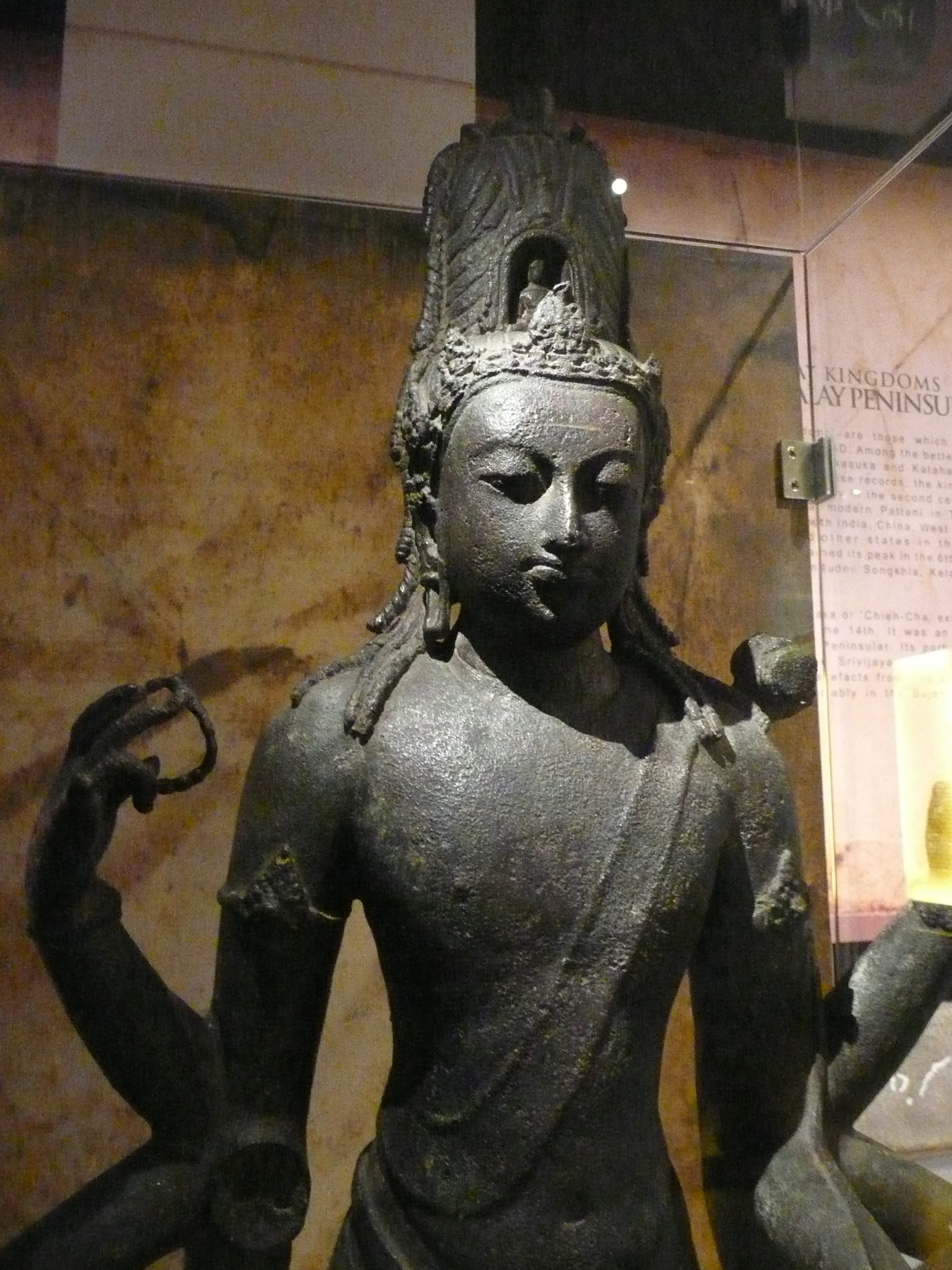
Avalokitesvara found at Bidor, 8th-9th century CE

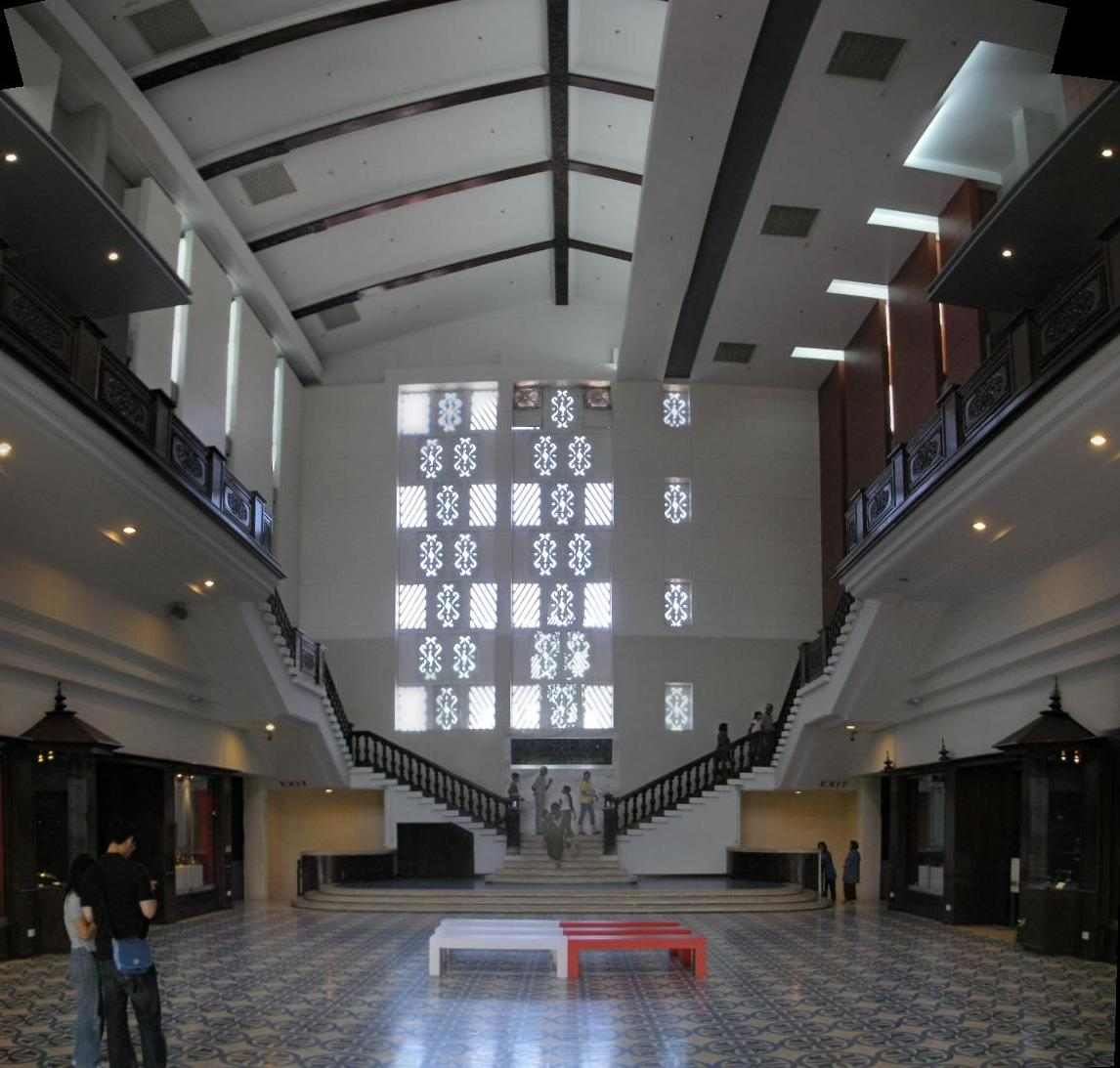
View into the main hall

Construction of the new National Museum began in 1959 and was completed in 1963. The museum was officially inaugurated on 31 August 1963 by Tuanku Syed Putra Ibni al-Marhum Syed Hassan Jamalullail, the 3rd Yang di-Pertuan Agong.

The museum was designed by architect Ho Kok Hoe, who was inspired by the architecture of the Malay royal palaces and vernacular Malay architecture. The design incorporated the need for exhibition and activity spaces. The large mosaic murals spanning the entrance depict the history and culture of the country. The floor of the central section of the main building is decorated with special tiles which were gifts from the government of Pakistan. In addition, UNESCO facilitated consultancies by museum experts from other museums around the world.

On 4 April 1996, the building was gazetted under the Antiquities Act 169/1976 as an ancient monument and historical site.

=== Museum Volunteer Malaysia (MVM) ===
With the support of the Department of National Museums, cultural and history enthusiasts residing in the greater Kuala Lumpur area formed a group of volunteer museum tour guides in 2007 to accommodate the growing number of international tourists. At any time, between 20 and 100 volunteers of many nationalities provide tours in English, Korean, Japanese, and French. A related group was established for Malaysian visitors, operating primarily on weekends.

MVM also promotes Malaysian cultural and historical heritage in schools and organizing tours for members to places around Kuala Lumpur and Malaysia, such as a visit to Kuala Kangsar and Georgetown, Kuala Gandah Elephant Sanctuary, Royal Selangor in Setapak and celebrating the Hari Moyang in the Hma' Meri Orang Asli village in Pulau Carey. The group also organizes talks and classes about the cultural and historical heritage of the country.

In 2009, MVM organized the "Jom Main" Exhibition with the collaboration of National Museum, which revisits traditional games that children in Malaysia used to play.

== Galleries ==
Displays and exhibits in the museum focus on local history, culture and traditions, arts and crafts, economic activities, local flora and fauna, weapons and currency.

The museum houses various galleries, each with its own theme. The ground floor showcases the geographic and natural history of the Malay peninsula starting with the Stone Age, the Bronze Age and the Iron Age, Hindu-Buddhist kingdoms to Muslim sultanate of Malacca. The ancient Malay Hindu–Buddhist states of Gangga Negara, Srivijaya and Majapahit are referenced. Among the collections are the stone makara statue, the bronze Avalokiteshvara of Bidor, the model of Bujang Valley temple in Kedah, and also displaying region's ancient legacy such as Javan Borobudur and Majapahit vessel. The exhibit continues to the later Muslim Sultanate of Malacca and the various states of Malaysia. The display demonstrates the importance of Malaccan sultanate for Malaysian national identity. The second floor is dedicated to the colonial history leading all the way to Independence. There are copies of the royal headgear of Malay rulers.

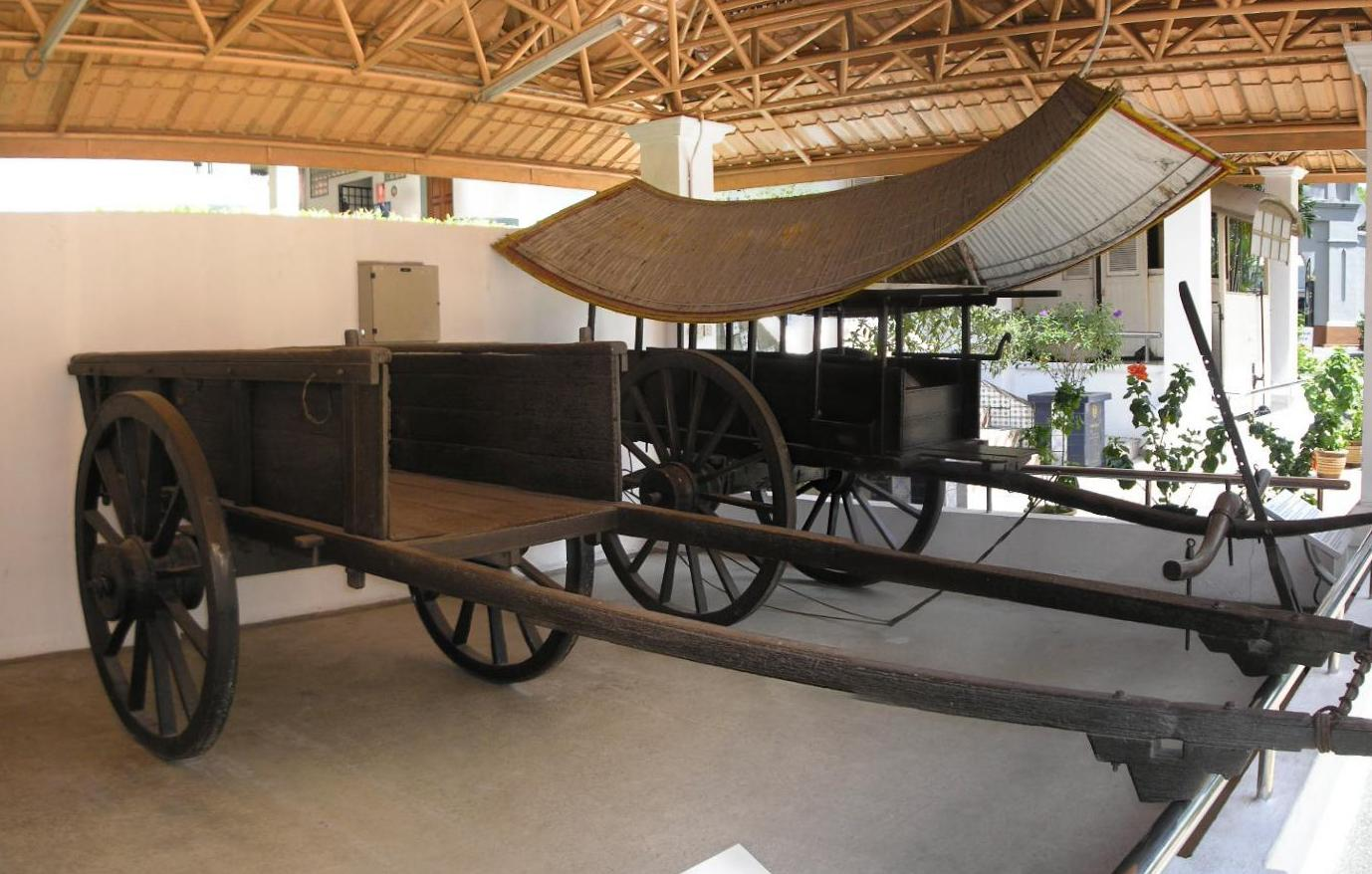
Traditional carts

Other galleries include the National Sports Gallery and the Natural History Gallery.

In the vicinity of the museum building, there are a number of outdoor displays of transportation in Malaysia, past and present. The Melaka Bullock Cart exhibit closely resembles the early American horse-drawn wagon. Of unparalleled interest are the Steam Locomotive made by Kitson & Co, England, which was put into service in 1921 until it ceased operation in 1969. It covered 1.5 million rail miles; a Tin Dredge which resembles a floating factory, on a natural or artificial lake. Also on display are motorized vehicles, including antiqued civic vehicles and private vehicles, including an early 1.3 liter Proton Saga, the first national car launched on July 9, 1985. In addition, there are two monuments in the grounds: a bronze bust of King Edward VII, and a statue of Sir Frank Swettenham.

National Museum also holds regular thematic exhibitions featuring specific aspects of life and world culture.

=== Central Hall ===
Adorning the floor of the Central Hall are blue geometric-design mosaic tiles from Pakistan, with intricate carved panels on the ceiling of the hall. The Central Hall houses temporary exhibitions, and thematic and special exhibitions are held at this hall at intervals to promote an awareness of the country's diverse culture and heritage. Foreign exhibitions are held occasionally.

Past exhibitions have included 'The Islamic Civilization', 'Our King', 'The World of Flowers', 'Durian King of Fruits', 'Masks from Sarawak', 'World Currency', 'Islamic Frontiers of China', 'American Frontiers', and 'Religious Architecture from the Netherlands'.

The museum places strong emphasis on the Malay World, and a considerable section is devoted to the founding of the United Malay National Organization, one of the parties of the National Front (Barisan Nasional). There are few if any mentions of the involvement of the Malayan Chinese Association and the Malayan Indian Congress, which three parties worked together to achieve Independence of Malaya on 31 August 1957.

=== Istana Satu ===
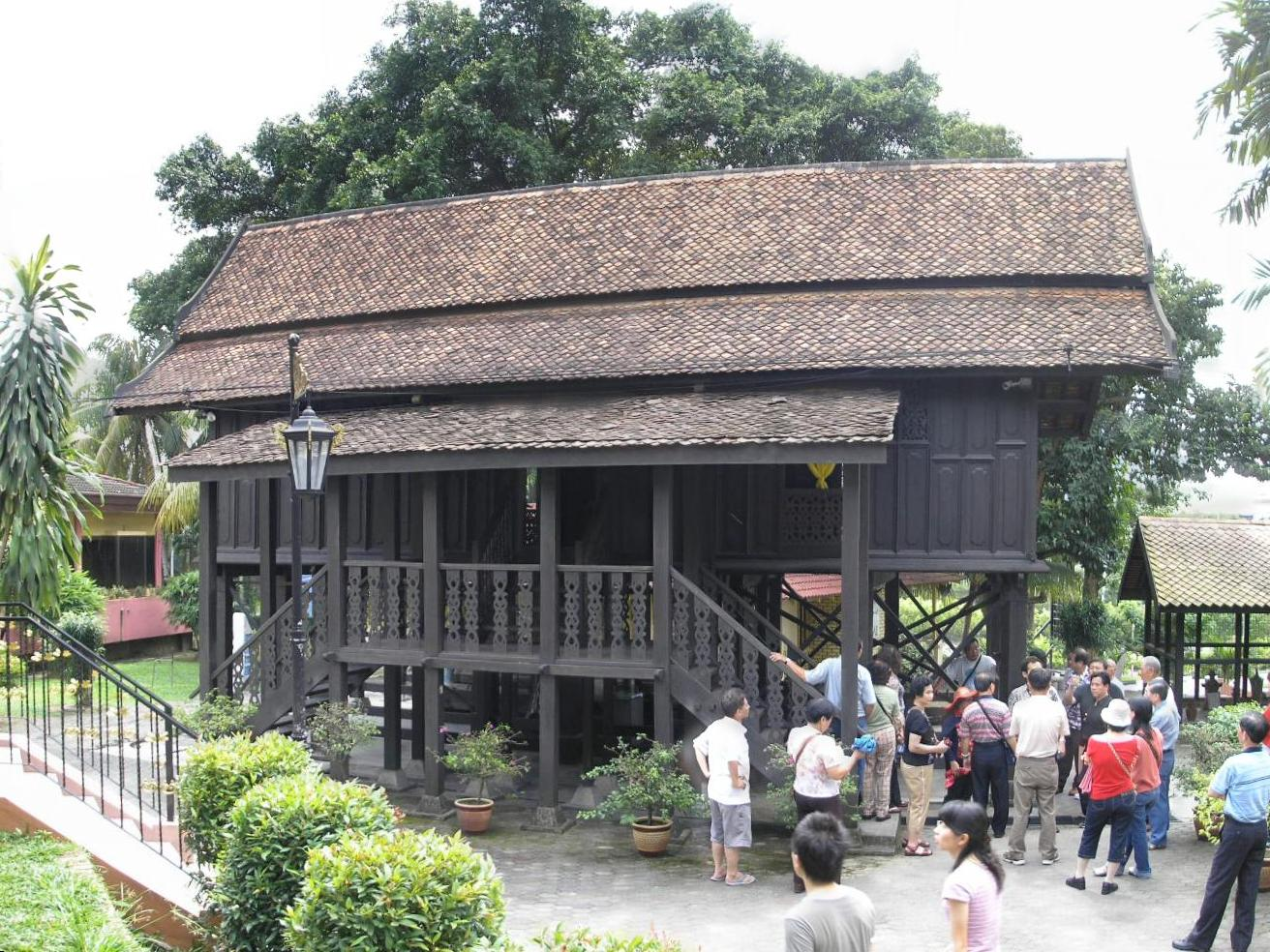
Istana Satu

Another attraction of the museum is an original-size old Terengganu timber palace known as Istana Satu. It was erected by Sultan Zainal Abidin III, Sultan of Terengganu in 1884 in the compound of Kota Istana Maziah, Kuala Terengganu. This building is of Terengganu Malay traditional architecture, in the form called "Rumah Tiang Dua Belas". The wood used is cengal. Istana Satu was erected in the National Museum compound in April 1974.

The restored palace is a wooden house designed for the tropics, with stilts that allow air to circulate freely under the building and a steep thatch roof to cool the interior. There are intricate wood carvings on the doors and windows.

Next to the Istana Satu are two keliriengs or burial poles. A kelirieng is made of a huge hardwood tree trunk, carved from the top to bottom. Niched up to its sides is a space for the bodies of slaves and followers and hollowed at the top to place the jar containing the chief's bones.

== Directors ==
- 1959–1963: Mubin Sheppard
- 1963–1967: J.J. Lowry
- 1968–1991: Shahrum bin Yub
- 1991–1996: Zulkifli bin Abd. Aziz
- 1996–2002: Kamarul Baharin bin Buyong
- 2002–2007: Dr. Adi bin Taha
- 2007–2008: Paiman bin Keromo
- 2008–2015: Ibrahim bin Ismail
- April 2015 – September 2015: Wan Jamaluddin bin Wan Yusoff
- September 2015 – present: Kamarul Baharin bin A. Kasim

== Public transportation ==
Muzium Negara is situated just behind, and lends its name to, the underground Muzium Negara MRT station. The station (not the museum) is connected to KL Sentral via a 240-metre (790 ft) long walkway. Access from the museum to the walkway to KL Sentral requires passing through the ticketed area of the Muzium Negara MRT station and the purchase of a train ticket.

== See also ==
- List of museums in Malaysia
