= Istana Satu =

Royal residence in Kuala Terengganu, Terengganu, Malaysia

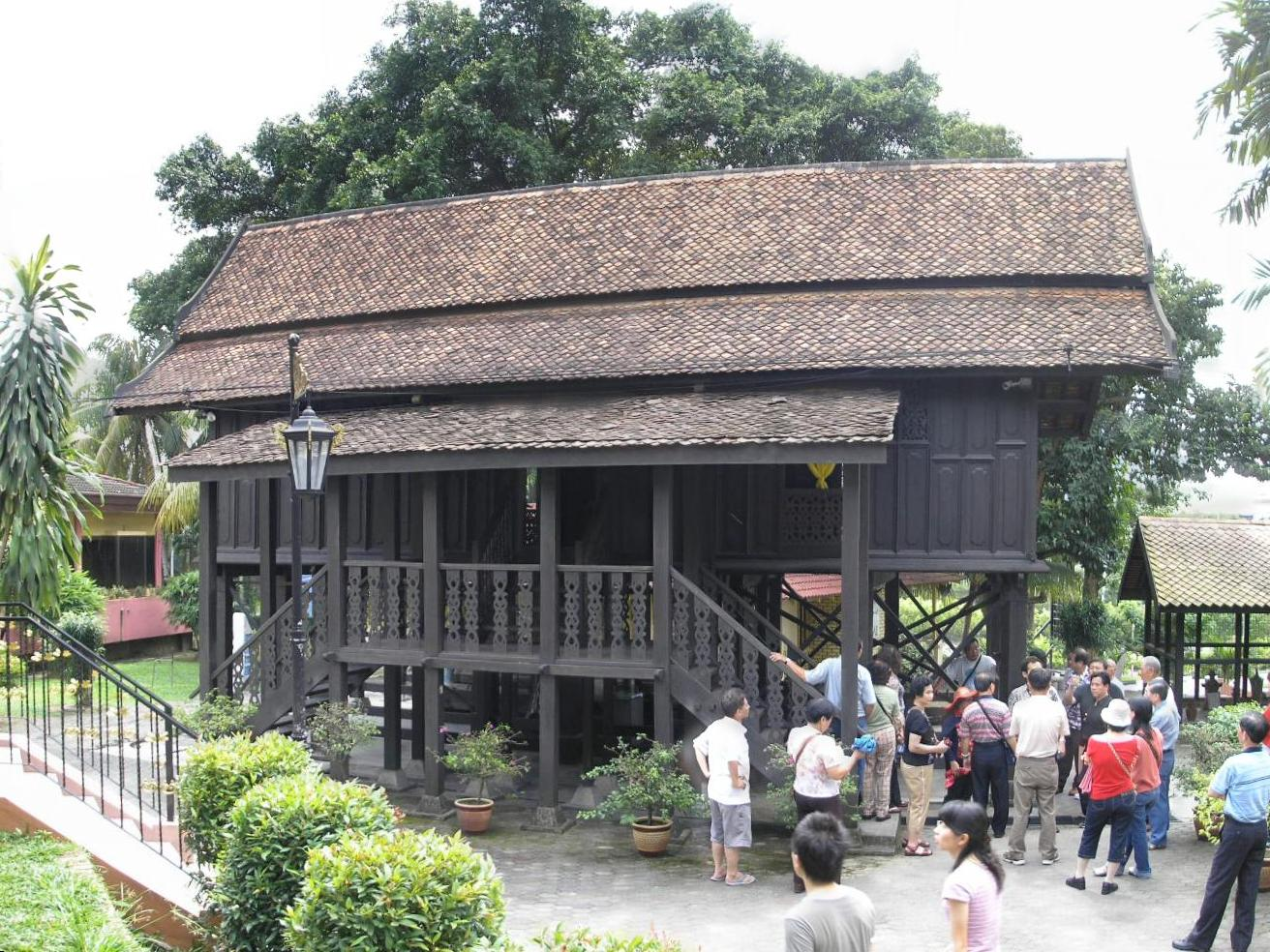
Istana Satu

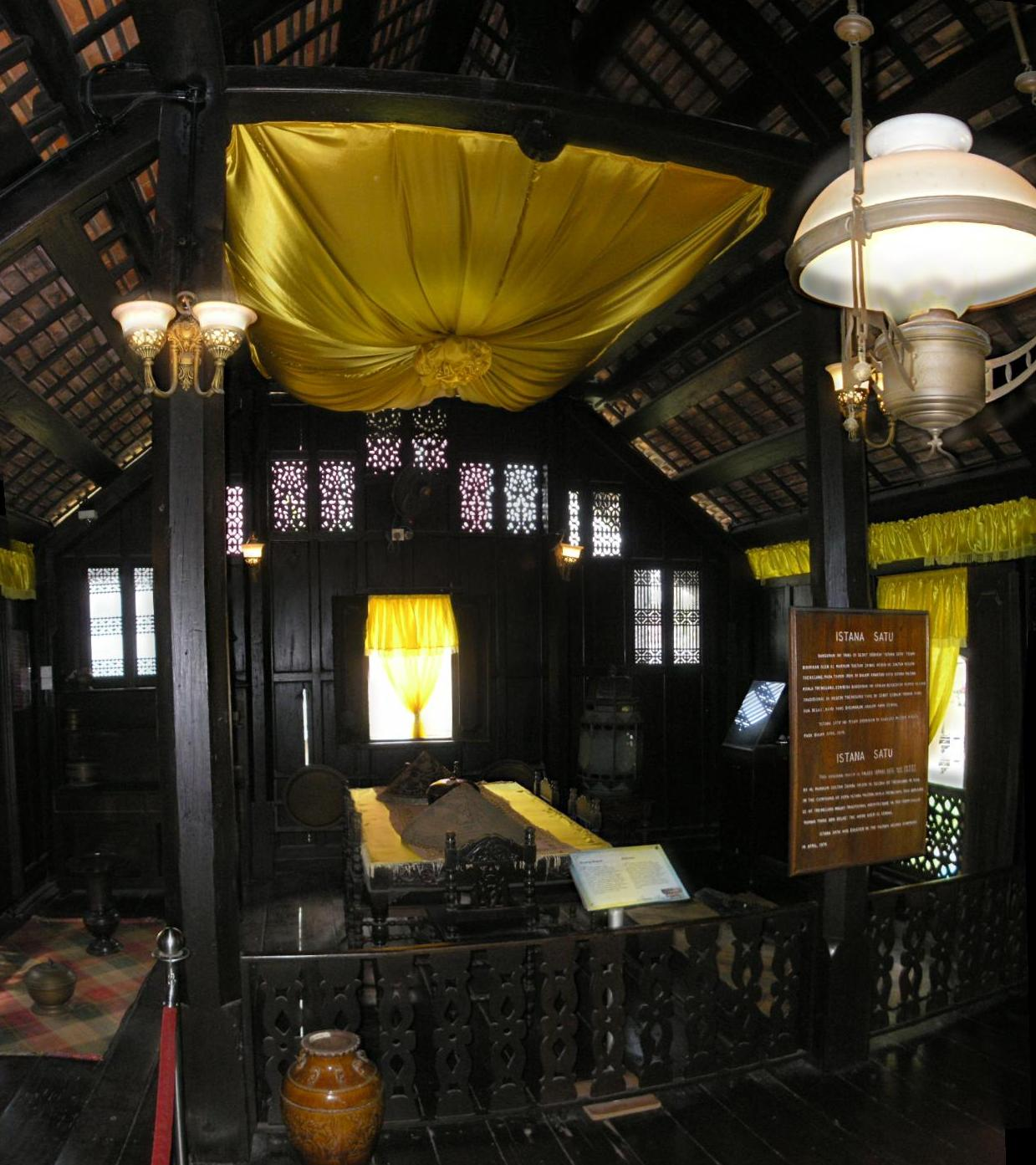
Guest hall of the istana

The Istana Satu (First Palace) was a royal residence in Kuala Terengganu in Malaysia.

== History ==
The Istana Satu was erected by Sultan Zainal Abidin III, Sultan of Terengganu in 1884 in the compound of Kota Istana Maziah, Kuala Terengganu. This building is of Terengganu Malay traditional architecture, in the form called "Rumah Tiang Dua Belas". The wood used is cengal. Istana Satu was erected in the Muzium Negara compound in April 1974.

The restored palace is a wooden house designed for the tropics. Standing on stilts that allow air to circulate freely under the building, the palace’s steep thatch roof helps keep the interior of the house cool. Intricate wood carvings adorn the doors and windows.

The guest hall of the istana is furnished with a cupboard that is made of carved wood with gold inlaid and complete with a mirror. The cupboard is used to store small decorative items. A hanging lamp is positioned from the ceiling, and a brass foot tray with legs is placed in the hall of visitors. Spread out is a mat made out of mengkuang leaves, a Malay feature to honour guests, and brass shields are mounted on the left and right walls. The kitchen of the istana is made from wood carved with floral motifs. Arranged on the table are a food cover made of woven mengkuang leaves and brass tray symbolising the pride and identity of the Malay race, together with a glass lamp. Kitchen utensils are stored in the cupboard.

Standing next to the Istana Satu are two keliriengs or burial poles. A kelirieng is made of a huge hardwood tree trunk, carved from the top to bottom. Niched up to its sides is a space for the bodies of slaves and followers and hollowed at the top to place the jar containing the chief’s bones.

The istana is located today on the grounds of the National Museum of Malaysia.
