= Bust of Edward VII, Kuala Lumpur =

1911 bust by Arthur Stanley Young in Kuala Lumpur, Malaysia

Bust of Edward VII
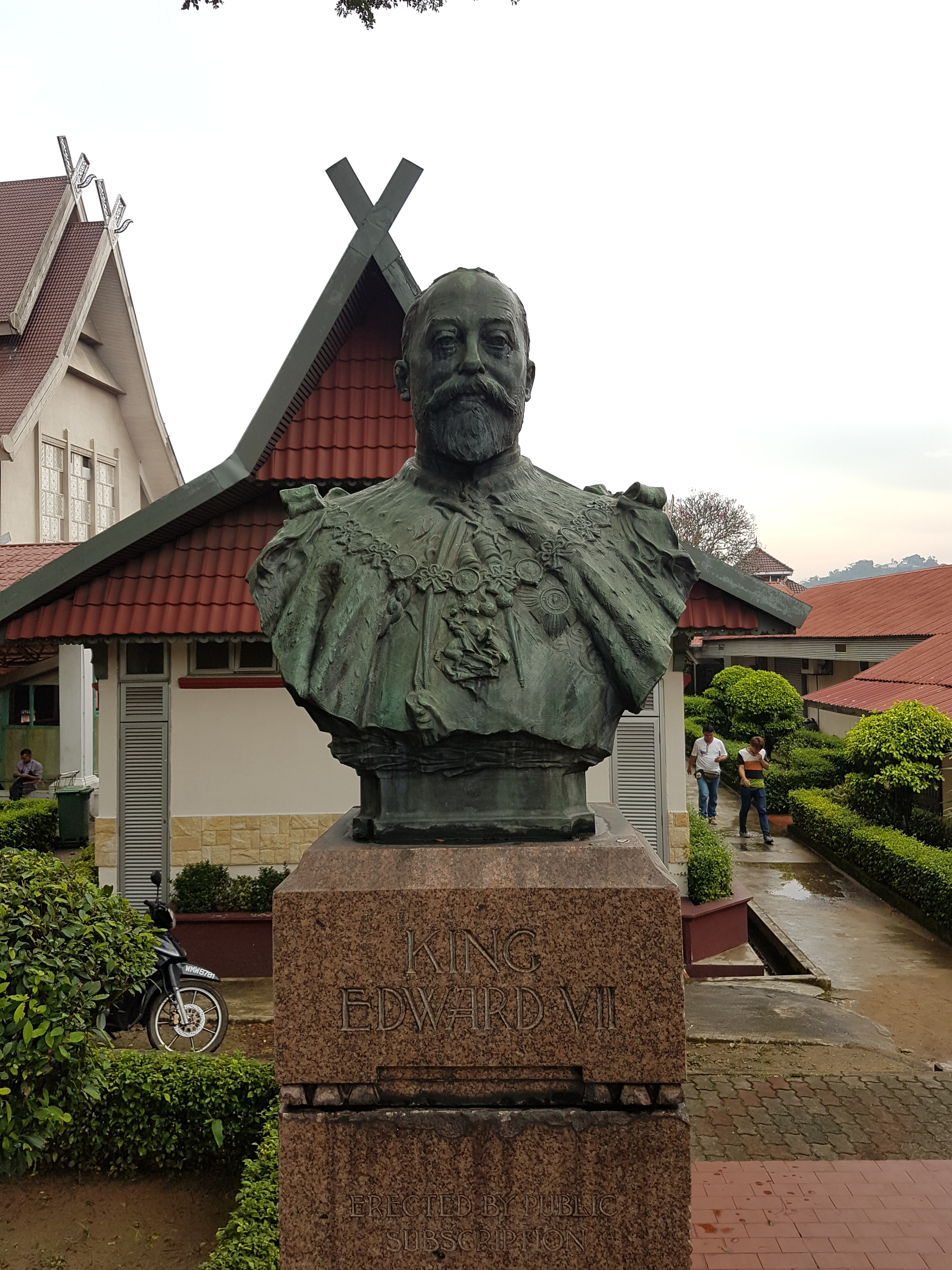
- Artist: Arthur Stanley Young
- Completion date: 1911
- Medium: Bronze bust
- Subject: King Edward VII
- Location: National Museum of Malaysia

A bust of Edward VII (9 November 1841 – 6 May 1910) stands in the courtyard of the National Museum of Malaysia, Kuala Lumpur, Malaysia.

== History ==
The bronze bust of Edward VII was created by English sculptor Arthur Stanley Young as a memorial to the late King. It was transported from London to Kuala Lumpur on 30 December 1911, and erected in front of the Government Offices (now Sultan Abdul Samad Building). On 16 April 1912 it was unveiled by Lady Brockman, wife of Edward Brockman, then Chief Secretary to the Government of the Federated Malay States, at a ceremony attended by the Sultan of Selangor, Sultan Allaeddin Sulaiman Shah.

During the Second World War, the bust was removed by the Public Works Department for safekeeping, and was returned to its former position in 1945. On 12 December 1964, the bust was moved to the nearby National Museum of Malaysia.
