= Statue of Sir Frank Athelstane Swettenham =

Bronze statue in Kuala Lumpur, Malaysia

Coordinates: 3°08′17″N 101°41′14″E

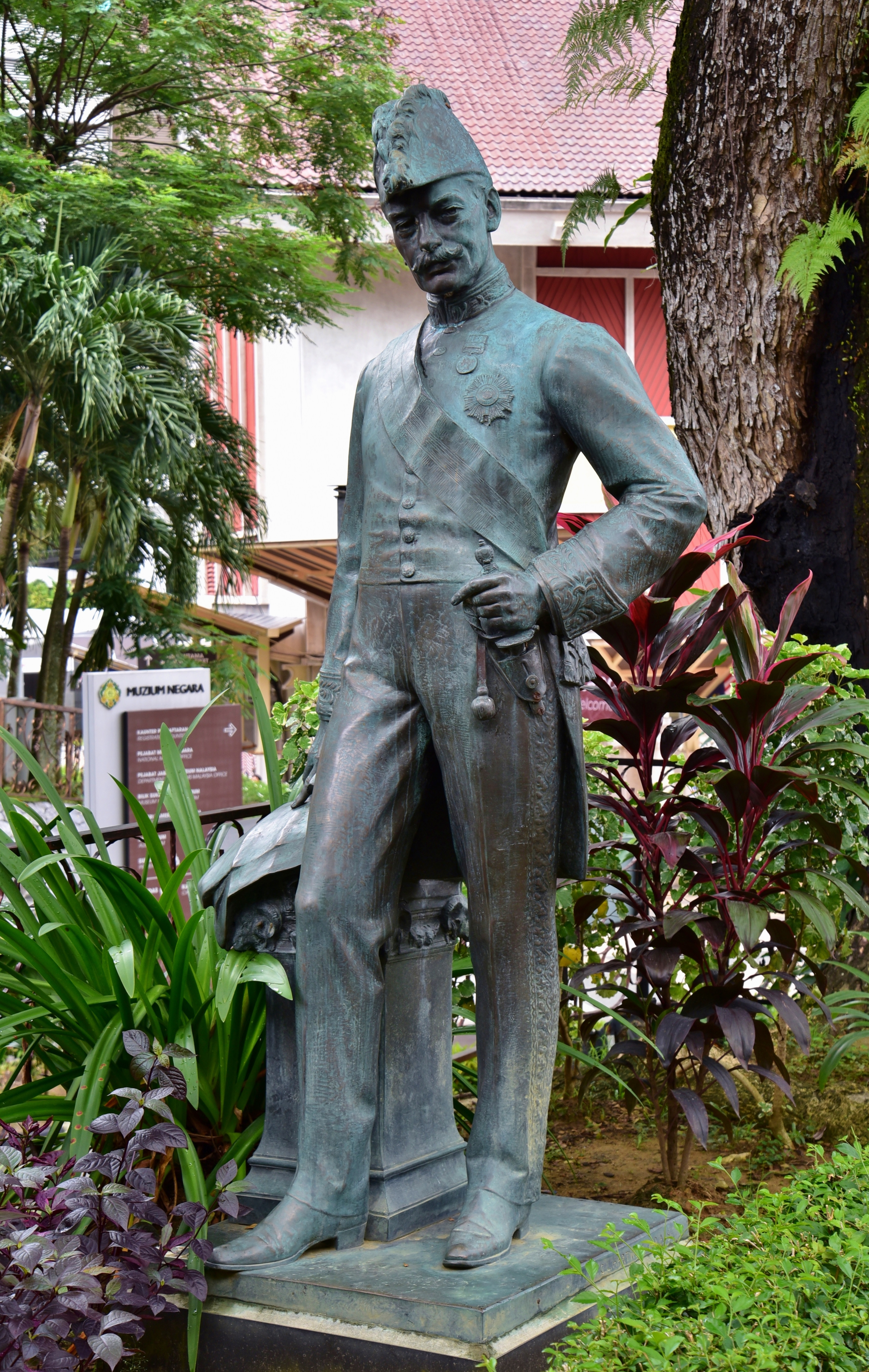
- Artist: Charles Leonard Hartwell RA
- Year: 1921
- Medium: Bronze sculpture
- Subject: Sir Frank Athelstane Swettenham
- Location: National Museum of Malaysia, Kuala Lumpur

A bronze statue of Sir Frank Athelstane Swettenham GCMG CH (28 March 1850 – 11 June 1946) stands in the courtyard of the National Museum, Kuala Lumpur, Malaysia.

== History ==
Frank Swettenham was a British colonial administrator, Governor of the Straits Settlements and High Commissioner for the Federated Malay States. The statue was funded by friends and acquaintances, and was created by English sculptor, Charles Leonard Hartwell RA, whose name is inscribed on the base.

== Unveiling ==
The statue was erected adjacent to the State Secretariat Building, Kuala Lumpur, facing the Gombak river, and was officially unveiled on 19 January 1921 by Sir Laurence Guillemard, Governor of the Straits Settlements and High Commissioner of the Federated Malay States. During the Japanese occupation of Malaya it was removed from its plinth and was returned on 15 October 1946. In 1964 the statue was moved into the grounds of the National Museum, Kuala Lumpur.
