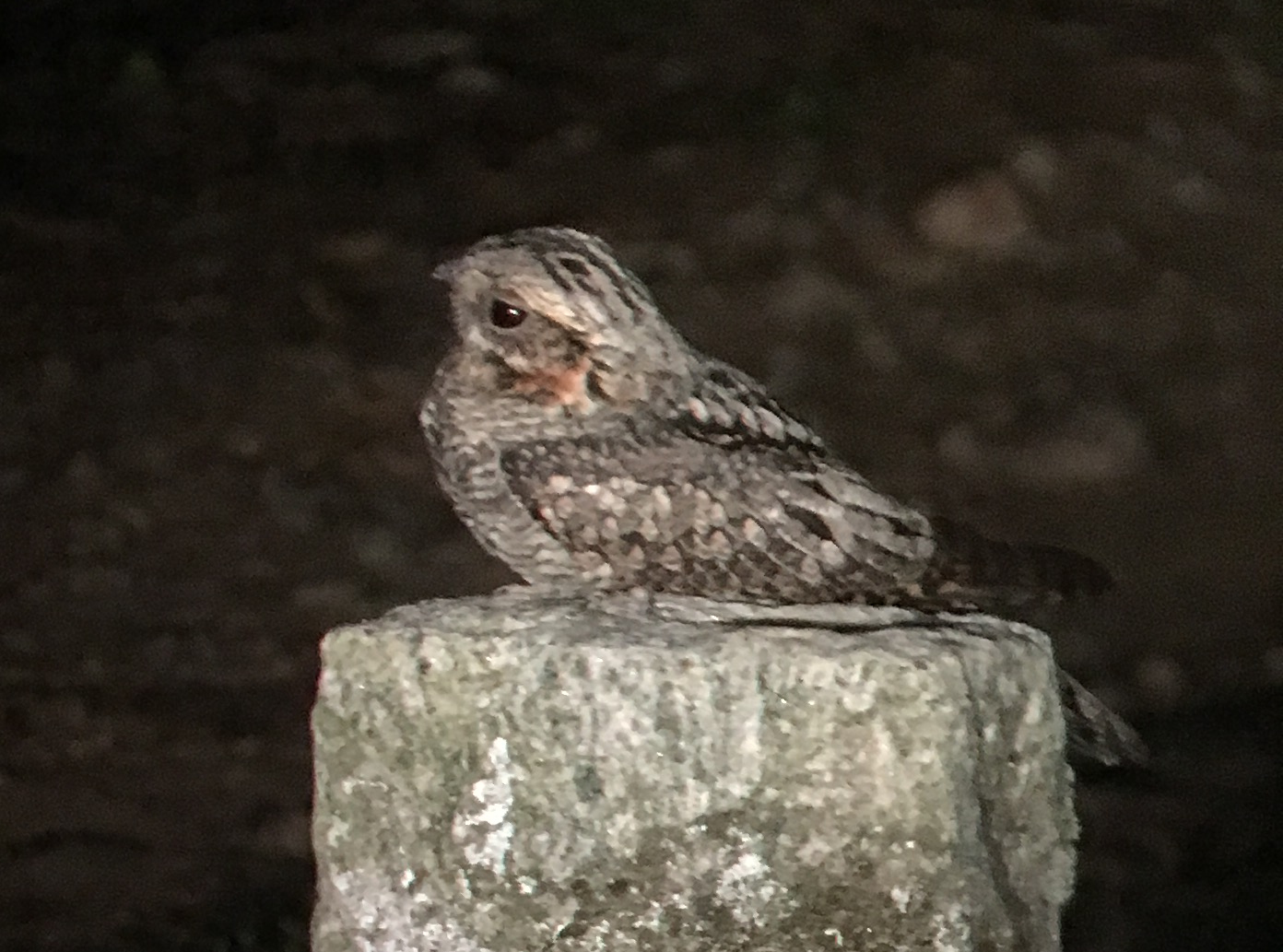
- In Anamalai hills, southern India

Conservation status
- Least Concern (IUCN 3.1)

Scientific classification
- Kingdom: Animalia
- Phylum: Chordata
- Class: Aves
- Clade: Strisores
- Order: Caprimulgiformes
- Family: Caprimulgidae
- Genus: Caprimulgus
- Species: C. indicus

Binomial name
- Caprimulgus indicus Latham, 1790

Audio
- Calls

= Jungle nightjar =

Species of bird

The jungle nightjar (Caprimulgus indicus) is a species of nightjar found in the Indian subcontinent. It is found mainly on the edge of forests where it is seen or heard at dusk. The taxonomy of this and related nightjars is complex and a range of treatments have been followed that cover this and several other nightjars in the Asian region. It was formerly called the grey nightjar or Indian jungle nightjar and sometimes included the East Asian grey nightjar (C. jotaka) as a subspecies.

== Description ==
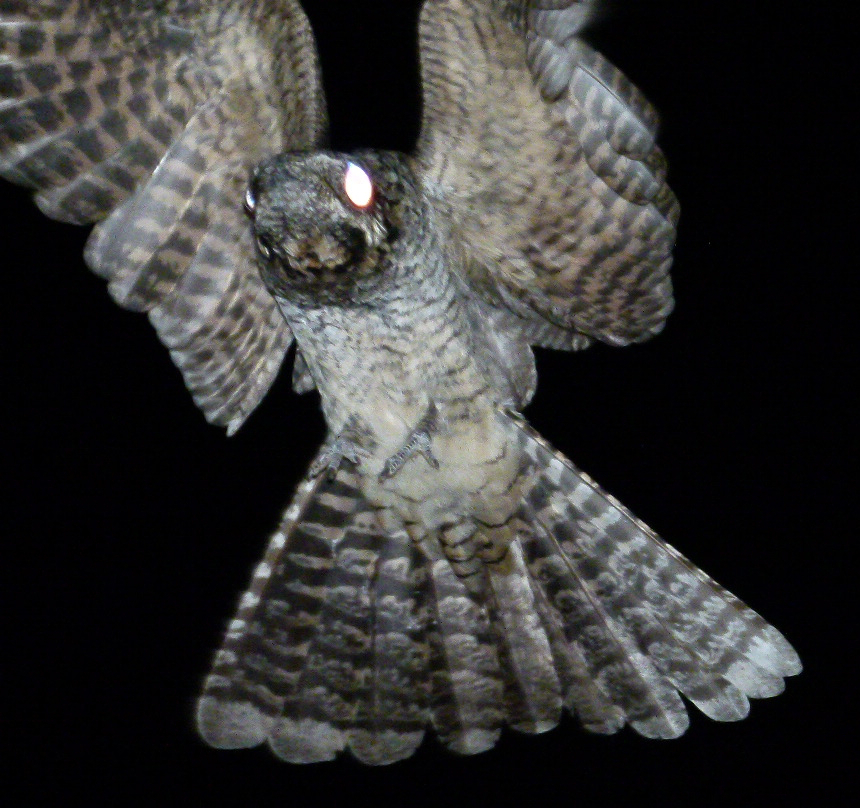
In flight (Western Ghats)

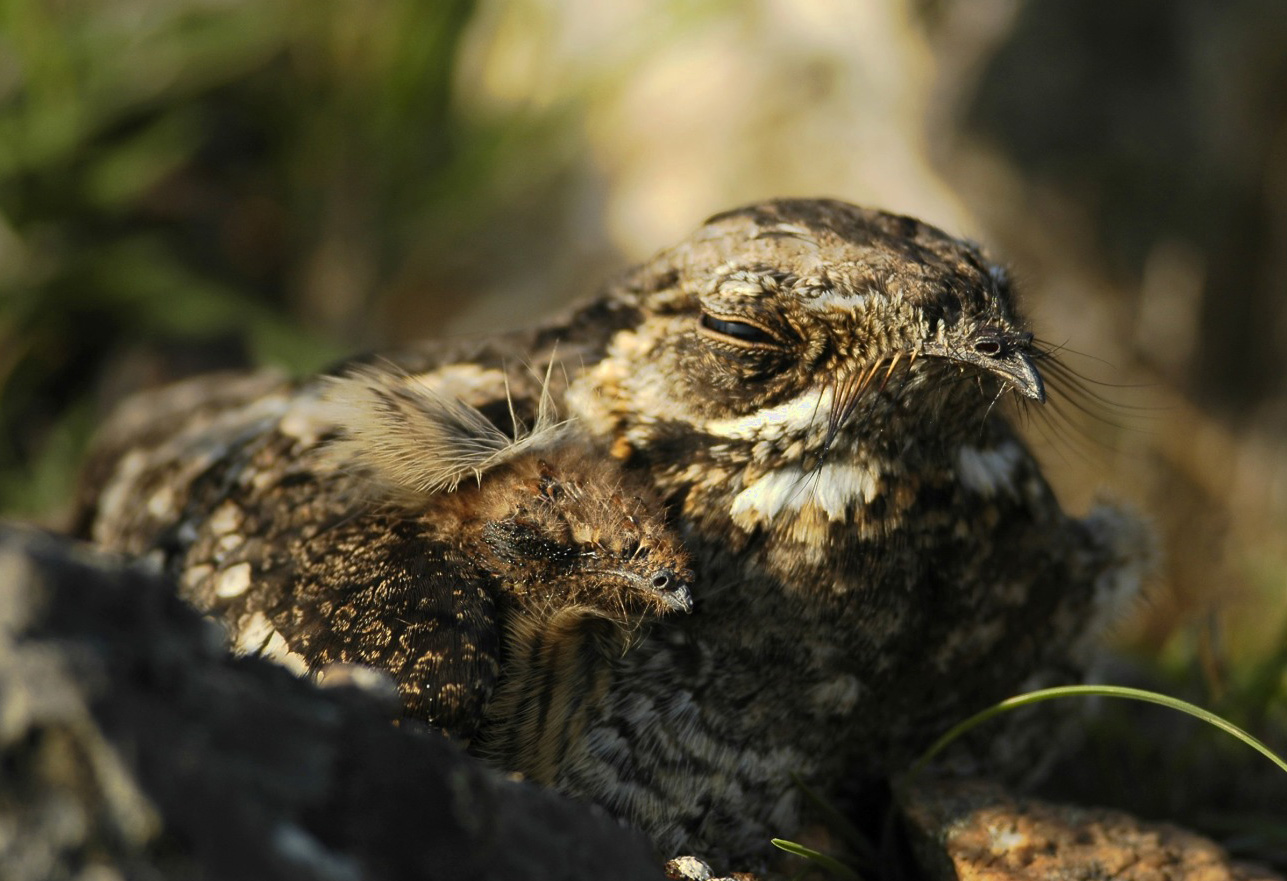
With chick, in Bandipur National Park

The jungle nightjar is about 21–24 cm long with the Sri Lankan population (ssp. kelaarti) being smaller. Mostly grey with black streaks on the crown, it lacks a conspicuous wing patch which is rufous. The tail is greyish with well separated narrow black bars. The male has a white throat patch that is broken at the middle. The female has a rufous throat patch and submoustachial streaks. The usual call is a series of thacoo or chuck notes (at the rate of 5 every 2 seconds) like a distant engine. The song is a slow and regular, series of FWik-m notes, repeated for as long as 10 seconds. This sometimes ends in quick whistling foo-foo with the quality of sounds obtained when air is blown over an open bottle. A call described as uk-krukroo attributed to this species by Ali and Ripley in their Handbook is in error and is the call of the Oriental scops owl (Otus sunia).

== Taxonomy ==
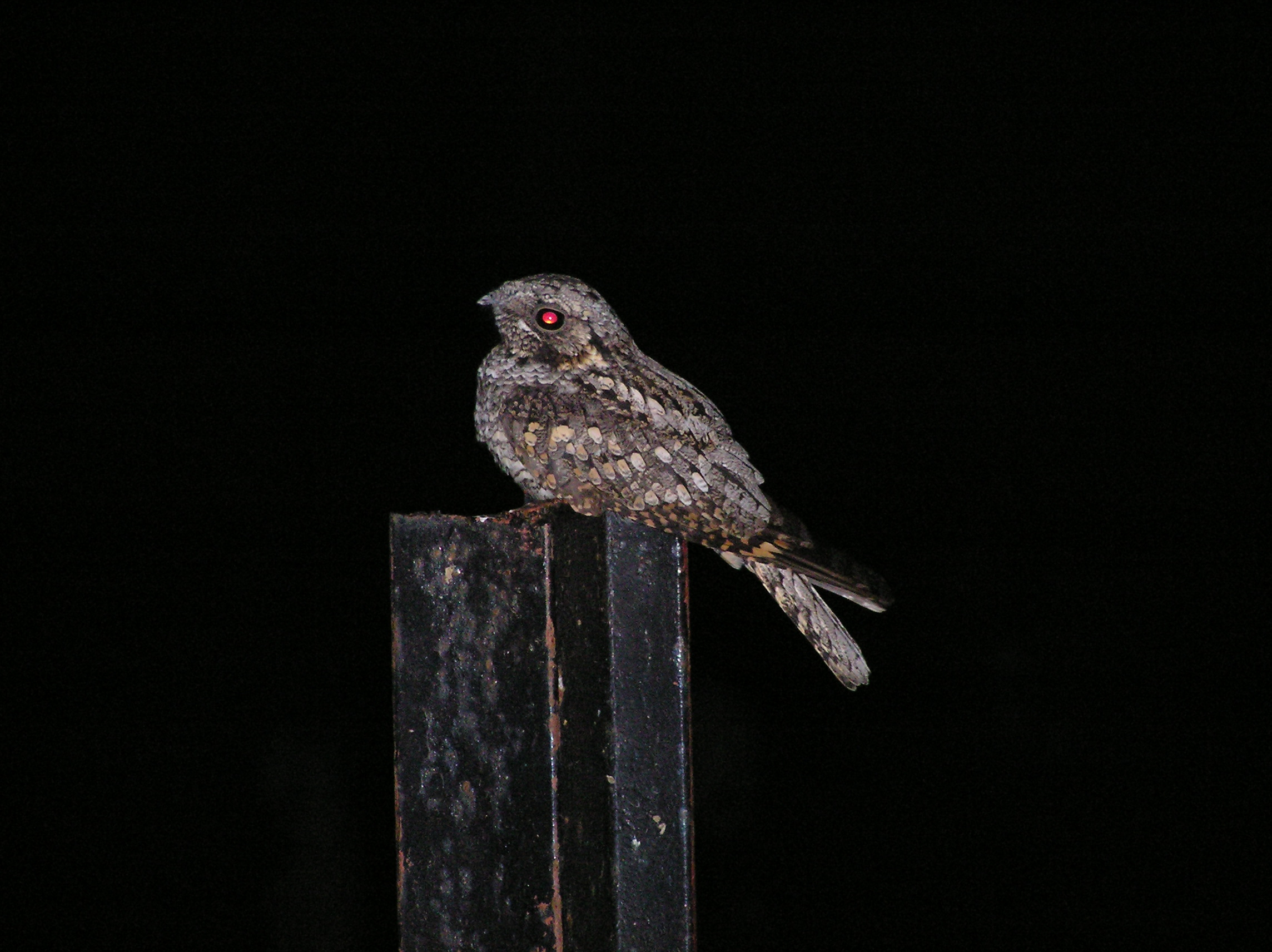
Jungle nightjar in Karnataka

The Indian (nominate) and the Sri Lankan populations (ssp. kelaarti) are included in this species while jotaka (whose egg coloration and calls differs) has been separated and elevated to a full species, Grey nightjar, by Rasmussen and Anderton (2005). The populations found along the Himalayas, west from Hazara to Bhutan and south to Bangladesh, hazarae, are then treated as a subspecies of Caprimulgus jotaka in this work. Records of jotaka have come from the Andamans and Phuentsholing.

Older treatments include the widely distributed (China, Japan) migratory subspecies jotaka and phalaena (Palau Island) in this species. Its scientific name means "nightjar from India", and it is thus sometimes confused with C. asiaticus which is commonly known as the Indian nightjar. To distinguish them, in former times C. indicus was known as the large Indian nightjar.

== Behaviour ==
The jungle nightjar becomes active at dusk, often over hilly grassland or scrub, perching regularly at favourite prominent bare posts or rocks. It roosts in trees, perching lengthwise along a branch. The breeding season in India is January to June and March to July in Sri Lanka. The nest is a bare patch on the ground in which two eggs are laid. Both parents incubate the eggs for about 16 to 17 days.
