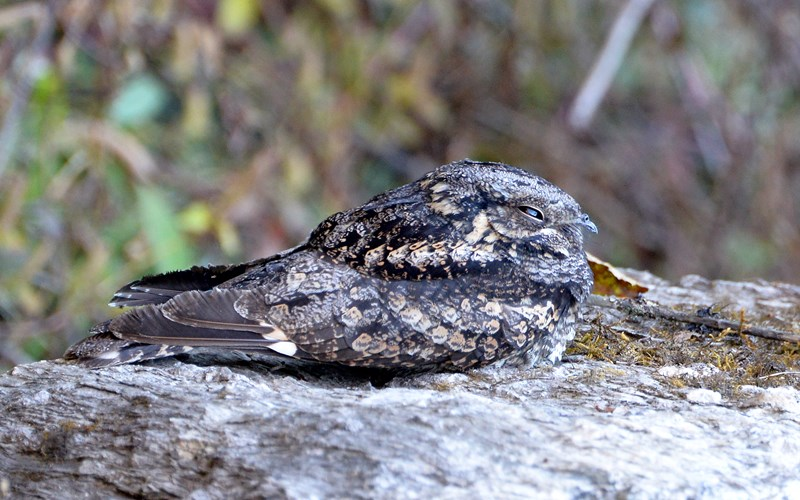
- in Eaglenest, Arunachal Pradesh, India

Conservation status
- Least Concern (IUCN 3.1)

Scientific classification
- Kingdom: Animalia
- Phylum: Chordata
- Class: Aves
- Order: Caprimulgiformes
- Family: Caprimulgidae
- Genus: Caprimulgus
- Species: C. jotaka

Binomial name
- Caprimulgus jotaka Temminck & Schlegel, 1845

= Grey nightjar =

Species of bird

The grey nightjar (Caprimulgus jotaka; also "gray" in some non-local literature) is a species of nightjar found in East Asia, breeding from southeastern Russia south through China, the Korean Peninsula and Japan to northern Indochina and westward along the Himalayas. It is largely migratory, wintering in Indochina south to Java in Indonesia, but is resident in warmer areas in the south of its breeding range. It is sometimes treated as a subspecies of the jungle nightjar (C. indicus), its South Asian relative. The grey nightjar breeds and forages in early successional habitats surrounded by forests; its populations have declined since the 1970s in Japan. Like all nightjars, it is crepuscular to nocturnal, feeding on flying insects, including moths, beetles, flying ants, grasshoppers, and others.

== Taxonomy ==
The species was formally described in 1845 by Coenraad Jacob Temminck and Hermann Schlegel with the binomial name Caprimulgus jotaka based on specimens collected in Japan. The specific epithet is the Japanese word for the species, Yo taka meaning "night hawk". The grey nightjar was subsequently included as a subspecies of the jungle nightjar (C. indicus; also called grey nightjar formerly) until Rasmussen and Anderton split them in 2005 by the distinguishable calls and egg coloration. Both grey and jungle nightjar can be differentiated from other relatives that occur in same habitats by their different patterns on the tail feathers.

== Description ==
The grey nightjar is a medium-sized nightjar with a large head, large eye, long tail, weak bill and short legs. The plumage is mottled, very similar to the Himalayas subspecies of jungle nightjar (C. indicus harzarae). The forehead, crown, and nape are covered with small, intricate grayish-white and dark brown vermiculated patterns mixed with black longitudinal streaks, with the central black stripe on the crown being particularly prominent. The feathers on the nape have pale brown spots at the tips. The upper back to the upper tail coverts are of the same color as the crown, but with more dark brown horizontal bars. The scapulars are black with brownish-yellow spots, and the outer webs often have brownish-yellow patches. The wing coverts and remiges are dark brown, with the tips of the wing coverts displaying round brownish-yellow spots. The inner flight feathers are grayish-white with black shaft streaks and vermiculated patterns. The primaries and secondaries are edged with reddish-brown serrated markings. The first primary feather has a white circular patch near the center of the inner web, and the second to fourth primaries have white horizontal bars. The central tail feathers are gray-brown with dense dark brown vermiculated markings and 6 or 7 black wavy horizontal bands. The outer tail feathers are mostly dark brown with prominent white subterminal patches. The lores, supercilium, cheeks, chin, and throat are dark brown with yellowish-brown spots on the feather tips. The ear-coverts are yellowish-brown with black streaks. The throat has a conspicuous white patch. The chest is dark brown with pale brown horizontal bars, while the rest of the underparts are pale brownish-yellow, densely covered with dark brown horizontal stripes. Female has similar plumage to the male but slightly paler; the white throat patch is smaller and often tinged with brown; no white spots in the middle of the flight feathers, and no white subterminal patch on the tail feathers.

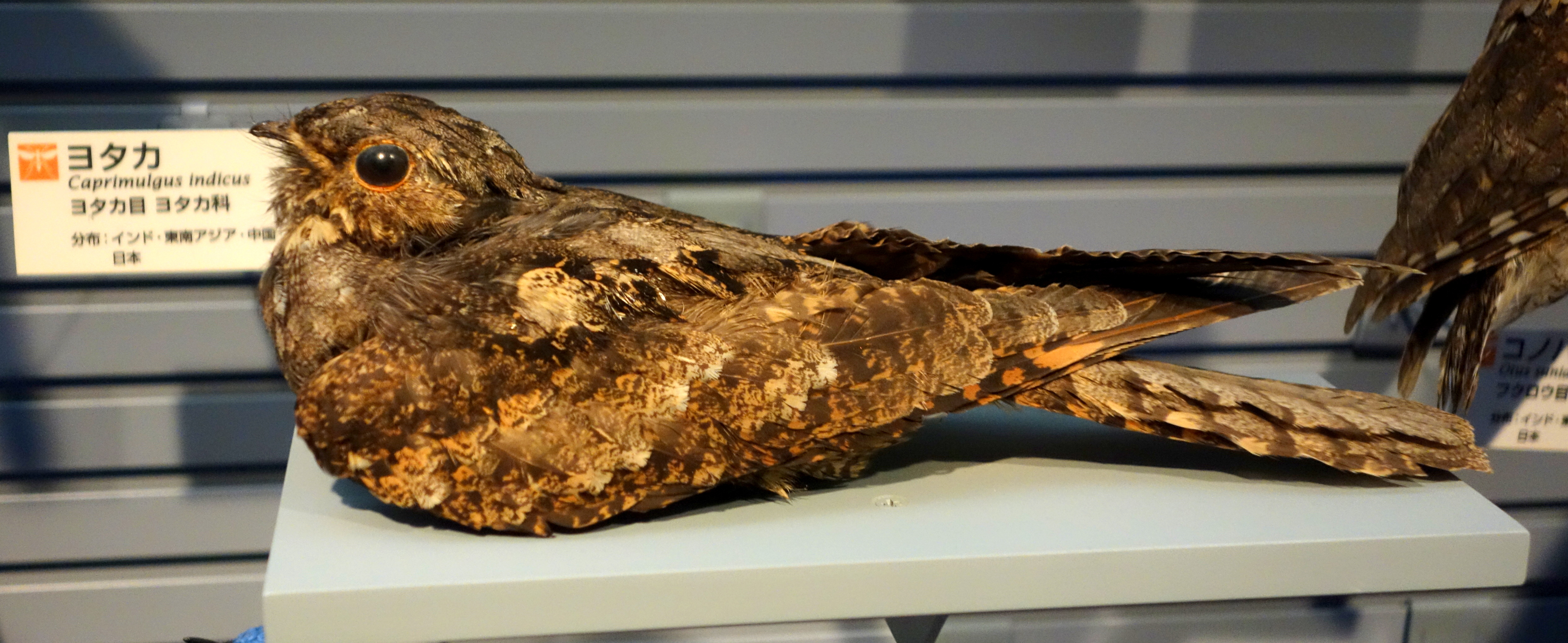
Grey nightjar specimen in the National Museum of Nature and Science, Tokyo

Iris: Dark brown; Beak: Black; Tarsus and toes: Horny brown; Claws: Black.

=== Measurements ===
Measurements of Grey nightjar
Sex	Length (cm)	Weight (g)	Wing Length (cm)	Tail length (cm)	Tarsus (mm)	Culmen (mm)
Male	25–27.8	61–100	19.7–22.3	12.1–14.2	15.1–17.7	9.5–11.1
Female	26–27.5	82–109	19.9–21.2	12.2–13.1	14.8–17.6	9.8–10.9

=== Voice ===
The vocalization of nightjars is an important aspect to distinguish them in field. The grey nightjar song is a series of hollow byuck notes lasting 2–4 seconds and repeated at short intervals, like the firing of a cartoon laser gun (click to hear). This song is a determinative evidence when splitting the grey nightjar from the jungle nightjar, that the jungle nightjar sings a long series of bouncing pooKIHpooKIHpooKIH notes (click to hear).

== Distribution and habitat ==
The grey nightjar occurs throughout the South Asia to southeastern Russia, and east to Japan. The estimated extent of occurrence is 17700000 km² (6834008 mi²). The resident range includes: Bangladesh, Bhutan, China, Hong Kong, India, Malaysia, Myanmar, Nepal, Pakistan, and Singapore; Some sedentary populations breed within the resident range while other migratory populations breed also in Japan, North Korea, South Korea, Mongolia and Vietnam. There are also some non-breeding occurrence in Brunei, Cambodia, Indonesia, Laos, Philippines, Russian Federation (Eastern Asian Russia), and Thailand. Vagrants have been spotted in south Alaska, US.

The grey nightjar habitat can be high, up to 3300 m (10827 ft) in altitude, includes forest, shrubland, cliffs or mountain rocks, and anthropogenic constructions. This species primarily inhabits broadleaf forests and mixed broadleaf-coniferous forests, and can sometimes be observed in coniferous forests below an altitude of 1,400 m (4593 ft). Populations distributed in south China at altitudes ranging from 700 to 2,500 m (2297–8202 ft).

== Breeding ==
The grey nightjar has an average generation length of 5.6 years. Breeding occurs between May and July. No nest is constructed, and eggs are laid directly on the ground, on rocks, or within dense coniferous forests, bamboo groves, or shrub thickets, as well as in open, bare areas. Occasionally, eggs are placed on grass, underneath a tuft of wild grass or shrubs. There is one nesting cycle per year, with 2 eggs laid per clutch. The eggs are elliptical, white with grayish-brown and dark gray speckles, averaging 30.7 mm in size (ranging from 27.2 to 33.1 mm) by 22.7 mm (ranging from 20.3 to 23.5 mm), and weighing 6.5 grams. The female incubates during the day, while the male takes over during dawn and dusk.

== Behaviour ==
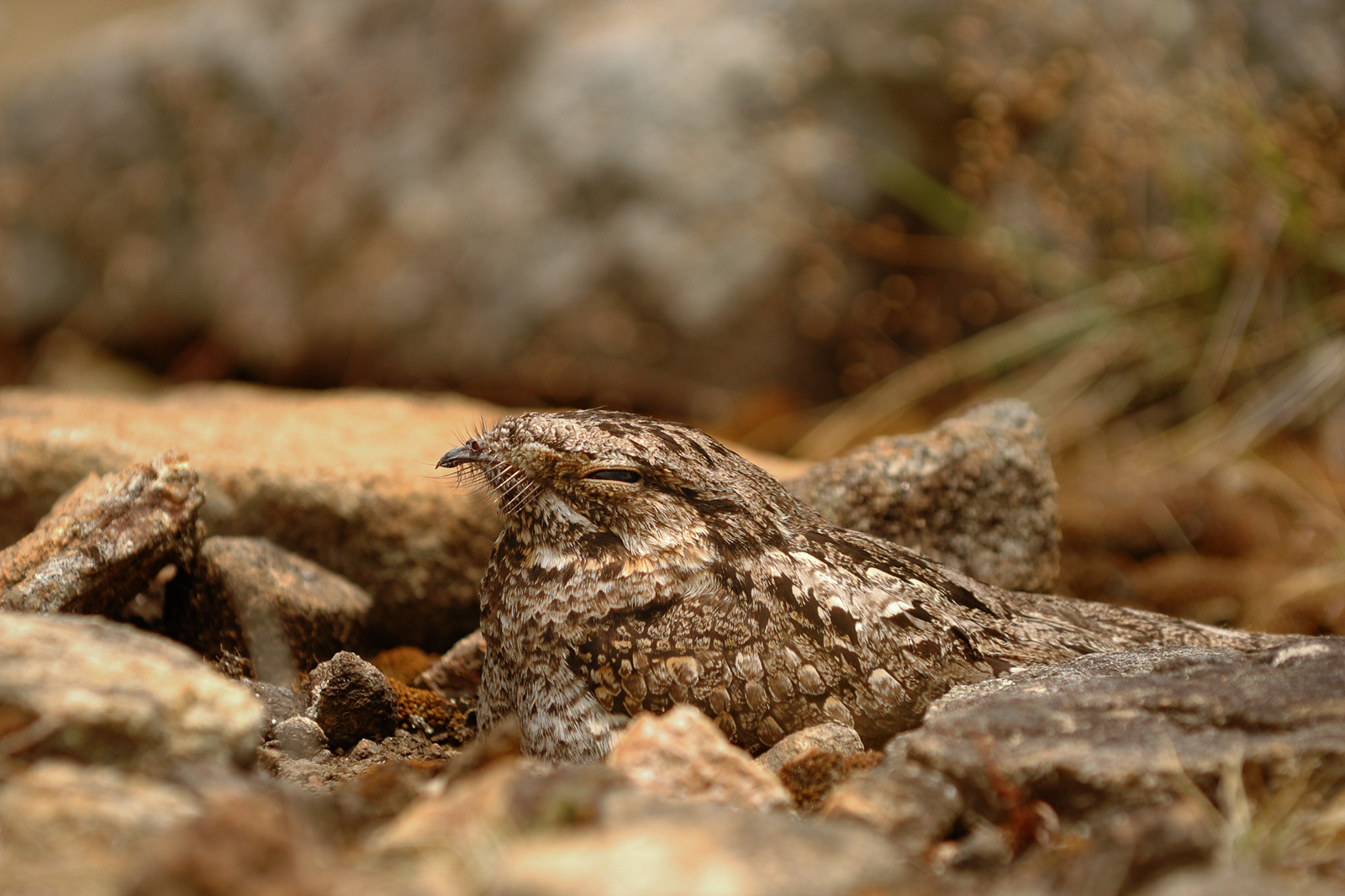
A resting grey nightjar

The grey nightjar is active at night, especially at dusk, continuously foraging for insects in flight. During flight, it is silent, with slow wing beats, occasionally gliding or hovering without moving its wings. Its flight pattern is often circular, but can become erratic with sharp turns when pursuing insects. During the day, it typically rests on grassy slopes or tree branches. When perching on a branch, its body axis aligns parallel to the branch, blending closely to it, making it difficult to detect while resting.

== Diet ==
The grey nightjar is insectivore and feed mainly on Coleoptera, Lepidoptera, and Hymenoptera. While individuals may occasionally consume seeds intentionally, various solid and hard particles such as wood, glass shards, and gravel have also been found in some birds. However, the reasons for the ingestion of these materials remain unclear.

== Conservation status ==
The grey nightjar's global population is stable and hence has been listed as "Least Concern" under the IUCN Red List of Threatened Species assessment in 2016. As this species possesses the ability to integrate into urban areas, there is no concern of habitat fragmentation under current circumstances. Although there is no systematic monitoring scheme, the entire range of the grey nightjar crosses through many conservation sites and the populations are tracked by local governments.

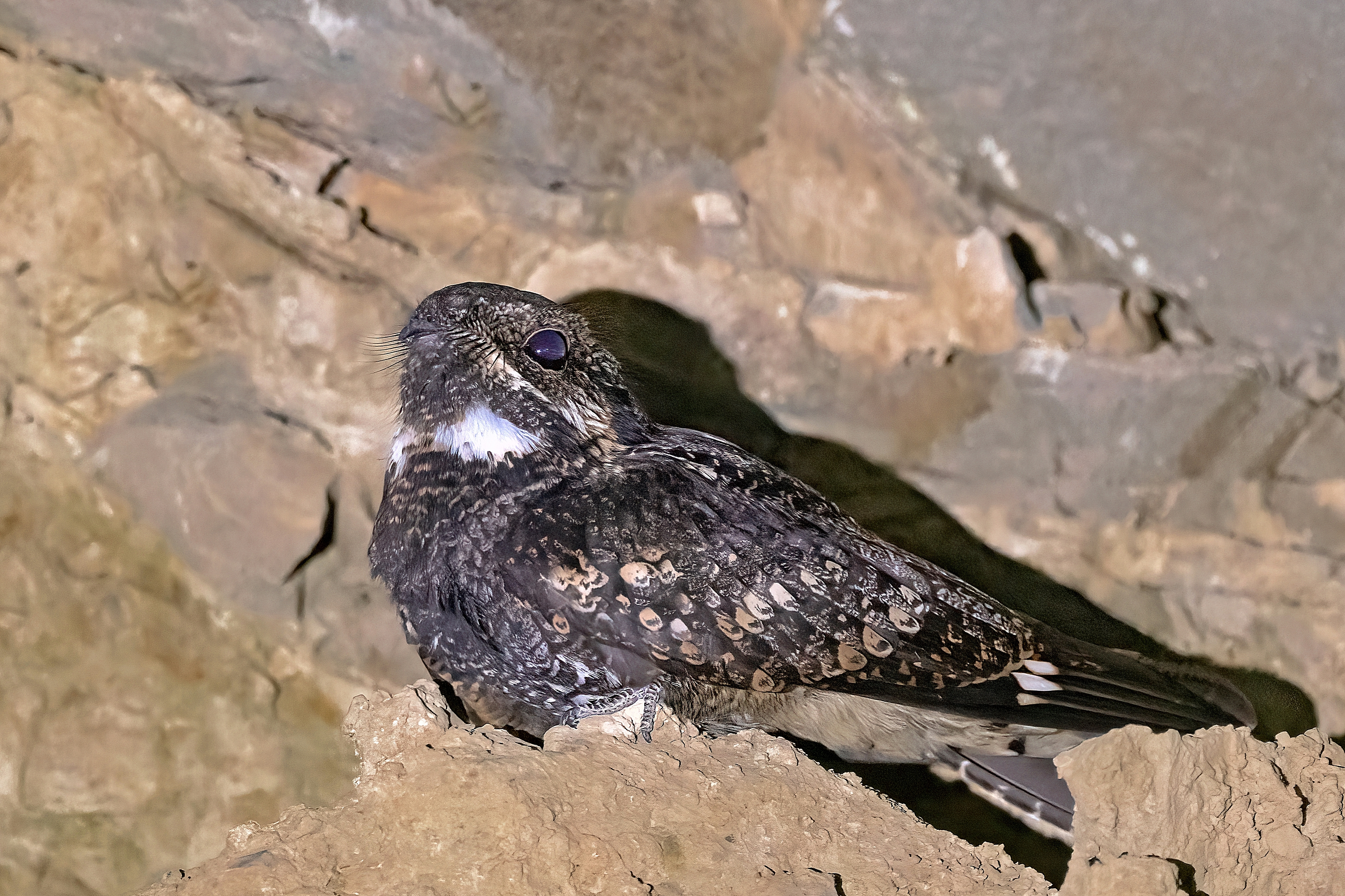
Grey Nightjar in Khonoma, Nagaland, India

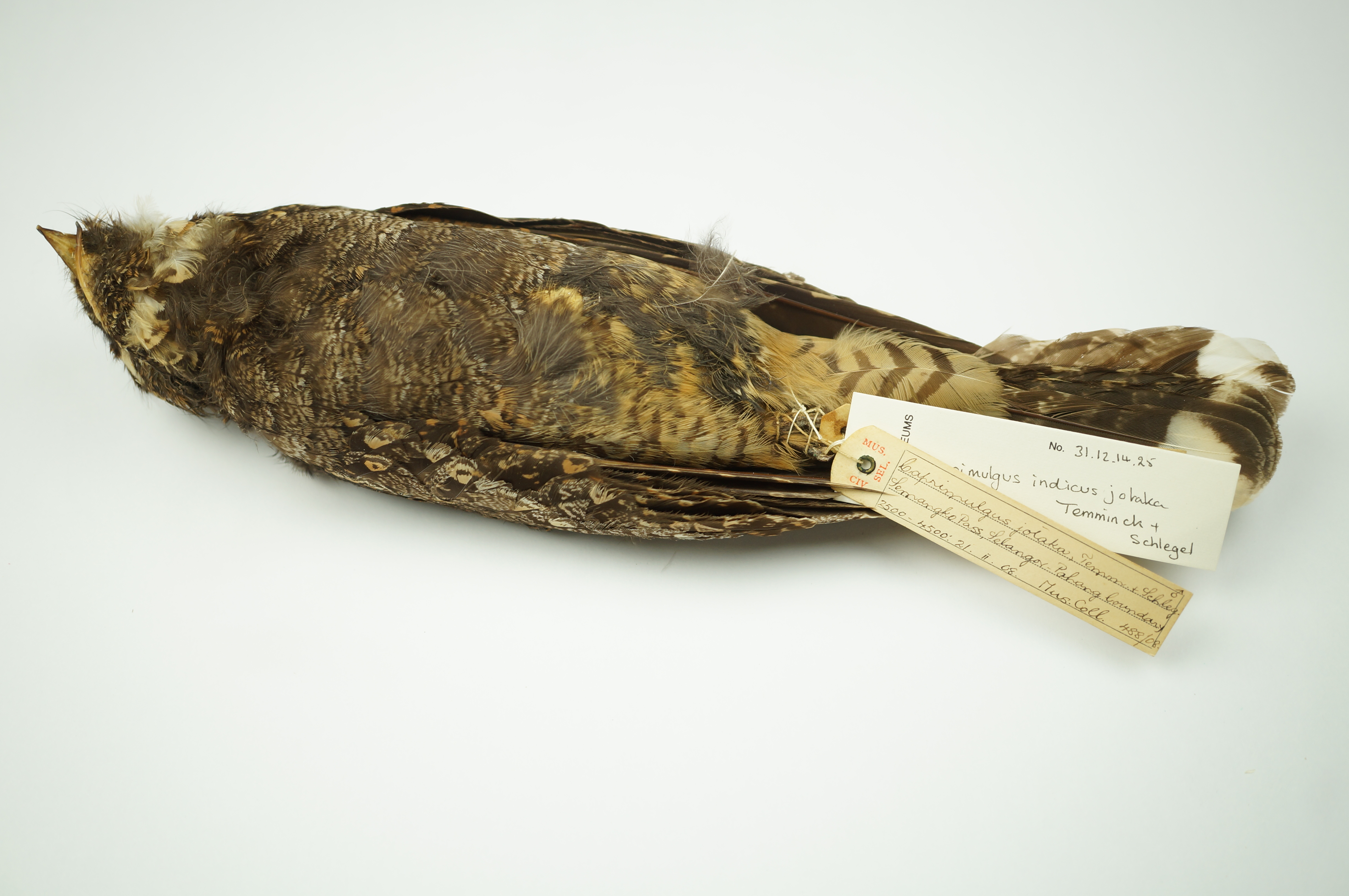
Grey nightjar from the collections of World Museum.
