= List of birds of Argentina =

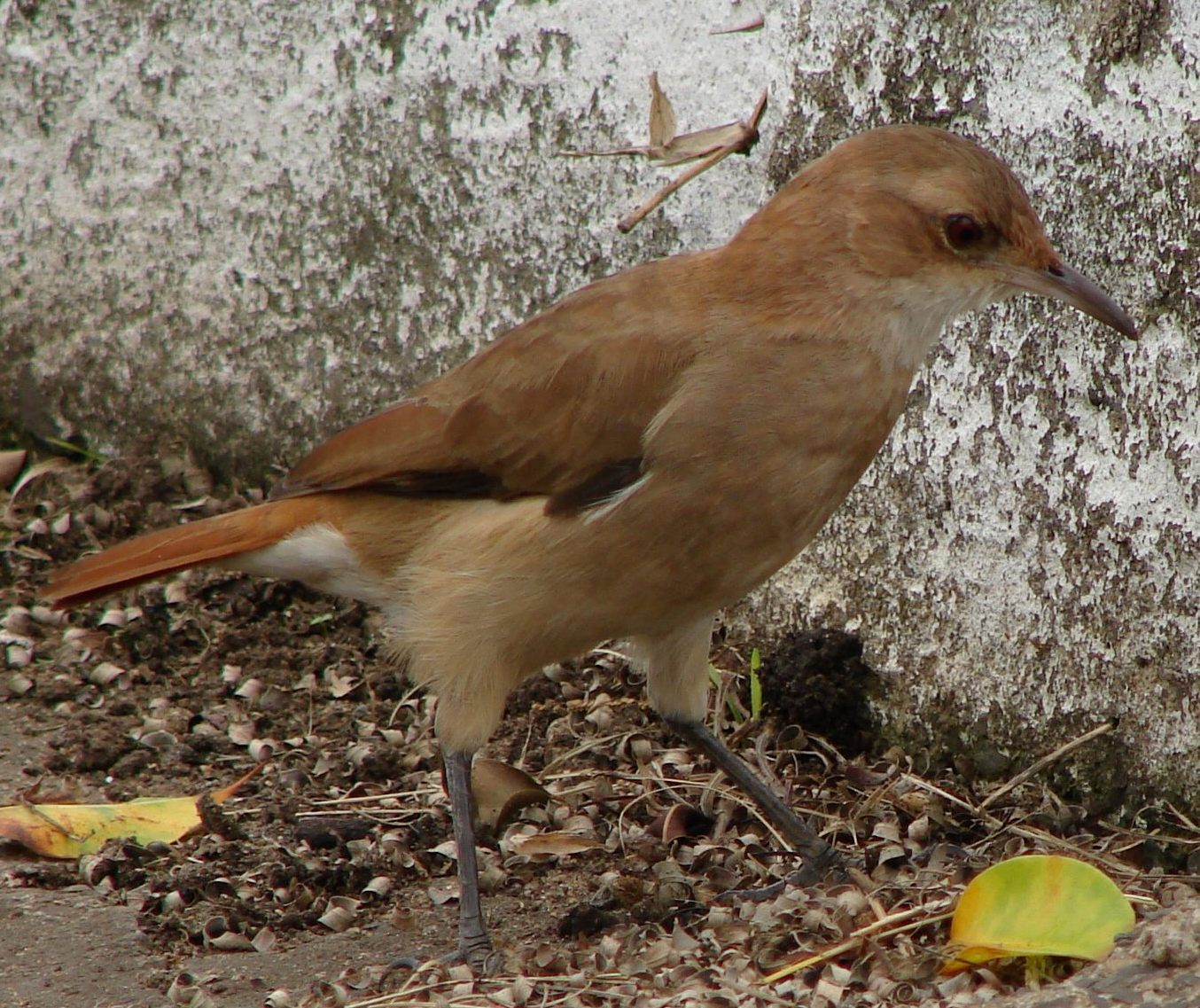
The rufous hornero is the national bird of Argentina.

This is a list of the bird species recorded in Argentina. The avifauna of Argentina has 1052 confirmed species, of which 18 are endemic, nine have been introduced by humans, 74 are rare or vagrants, two are thought to be extinct, and five have been extirpated. An additional 53 species are unconfirmed (see below). Except as an entry is cited otherwise, the list of species is that of the South American Classification Committee (SACC) of the American Ornithological Society. Five species are added from other sources and are not included in the above counts; these reports have not been confirmed by the SACC.

The list's taxonomic treatment (designation and sequence of orders, families, and species) and nomenclature (common and scientific names) are also those of the SACC unless noted otherwise. However, capitalization within English names follows Wikipedia practice, i.e. only the first word of a name is capitalized unless a place name such as São Paulo is used.

The following tags have been used to highlight several categories.

- (V) Vagrant - a species that rarely or accidentally occurs in Argentina
- (E) Endemic - a species endemic to Argentina
- (I) Introduced - a species introduced to Argentina as a consequence, direct or indirect, of human actions
- (U) Unconfirmed - a species recorded but with "no tangible evidence" according to the SACC
- (UC) Unconfirmed - a record from a non-SACC source and unconfirmed by the SACC

== Rheas ==
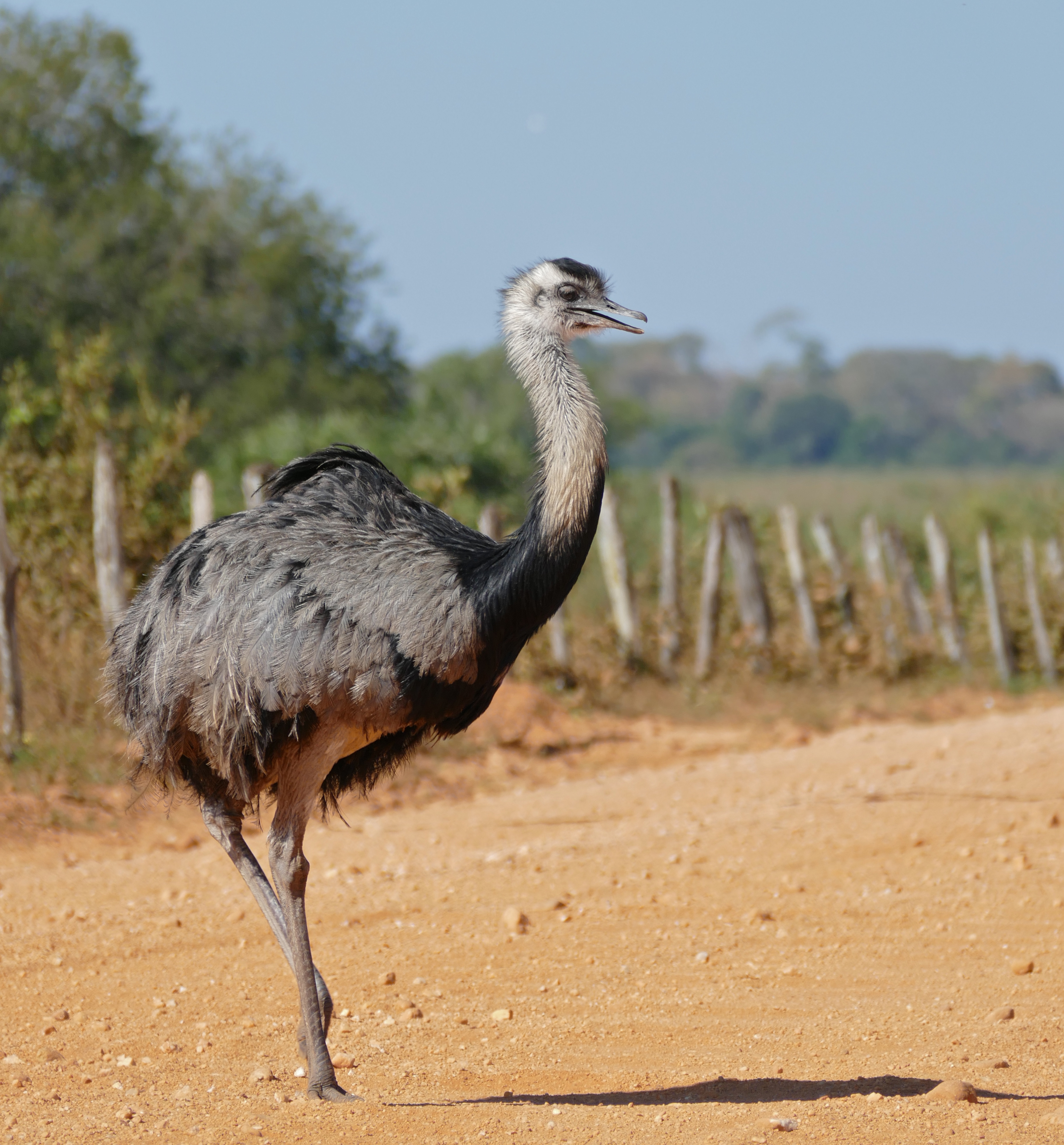
Greater rhea

Order: Struthioniformes Family: Rheidae

The rheas are large flightless birds native to South America. Their feet have three toes rather than four which allows them to run faster.

- Greater rhea, Rhea americana
- Lesser rhea, Pterocnemia pennata

== Tinamous ==
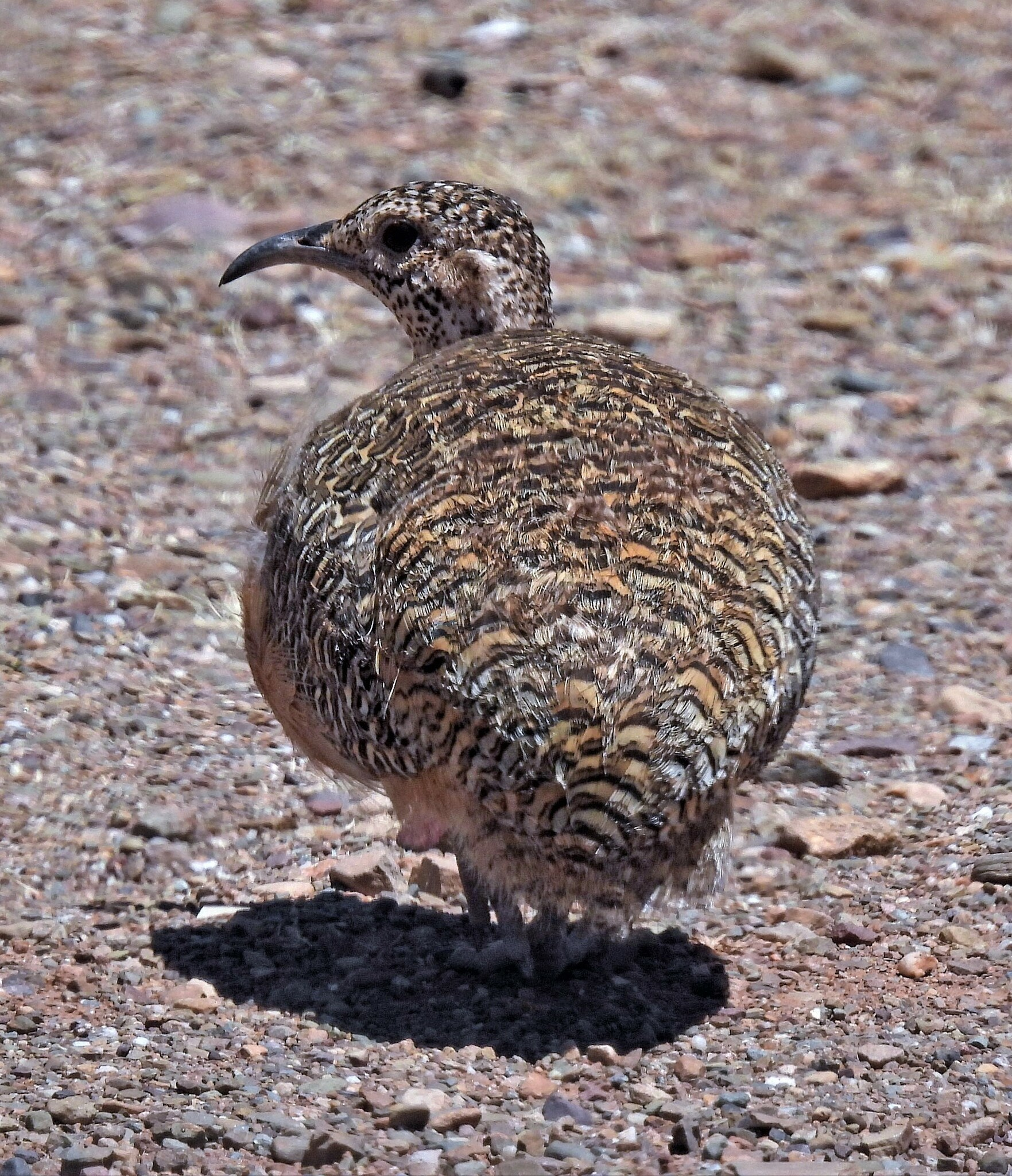
Ornate tinamou

Order: Tinamiformes Family: Tinamidae

The tinamous are one of the most ancient groups of bird. Although they look similar to other ground-dwelling birds like quail and grouse, they have no close relatives and are classified as a single family, Tinamidae, within their own order, the Tinamiformes.

- Solitary tinamou, Tinamus solitarius
- Brown tinamou, Crypturellus obsoletus
- Undulated tinamou, Crypturellus undulatus
- Small-billed tinamou, Crypturellus parvirostris
- Tataupa tinamou, Crypturellus tataupa
- Red-winged tinamou, Rhynchotus rufescens
- Huayco tinamou, Rhynchotus maculicollis
- Ornate tinamou, Nothoprocta ornata
- Brushland tinamou, Nothoprocta cinerascens
- Andean tinamou, Nothoprocta pentlandii
- Darwin's nothura, Nothura darwinii
- Spotted nothura, Nothura maculosa
- Dwarf tinamou, Taoniscus nanus
- Elegant crested-tinamou, Eudromia elegans
- Quebracho crested-tinamou, Eudromia formosa
- Puna tinamou, Tinamotis pentlandii
- Patagonian tinamou, Tinamotis ingoufi

== Screamers ==
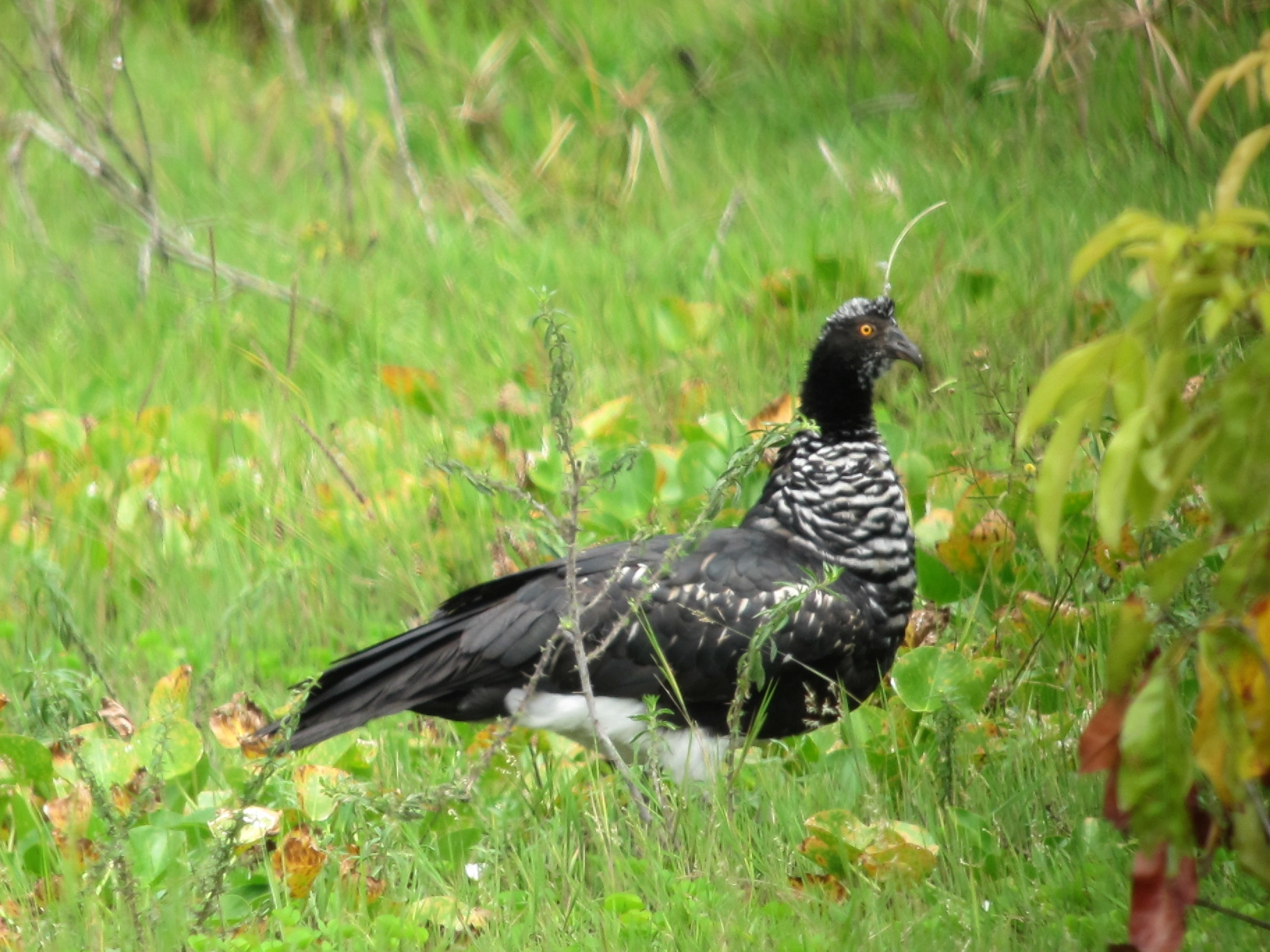
Horned screamer

Order: Anseriformes Family: Anhimidae

The screamers are a small family of birds related to the ducks. They are large, bulky birds, with a small downy head, long legs and large feet which are only partially webbed. They have large spurs on their wings which are used in fights over mates and in territorial disputes.

- Horned screamer, Anhima cornuta
- Southern screamer, Chauna torquata

== Ducks ==
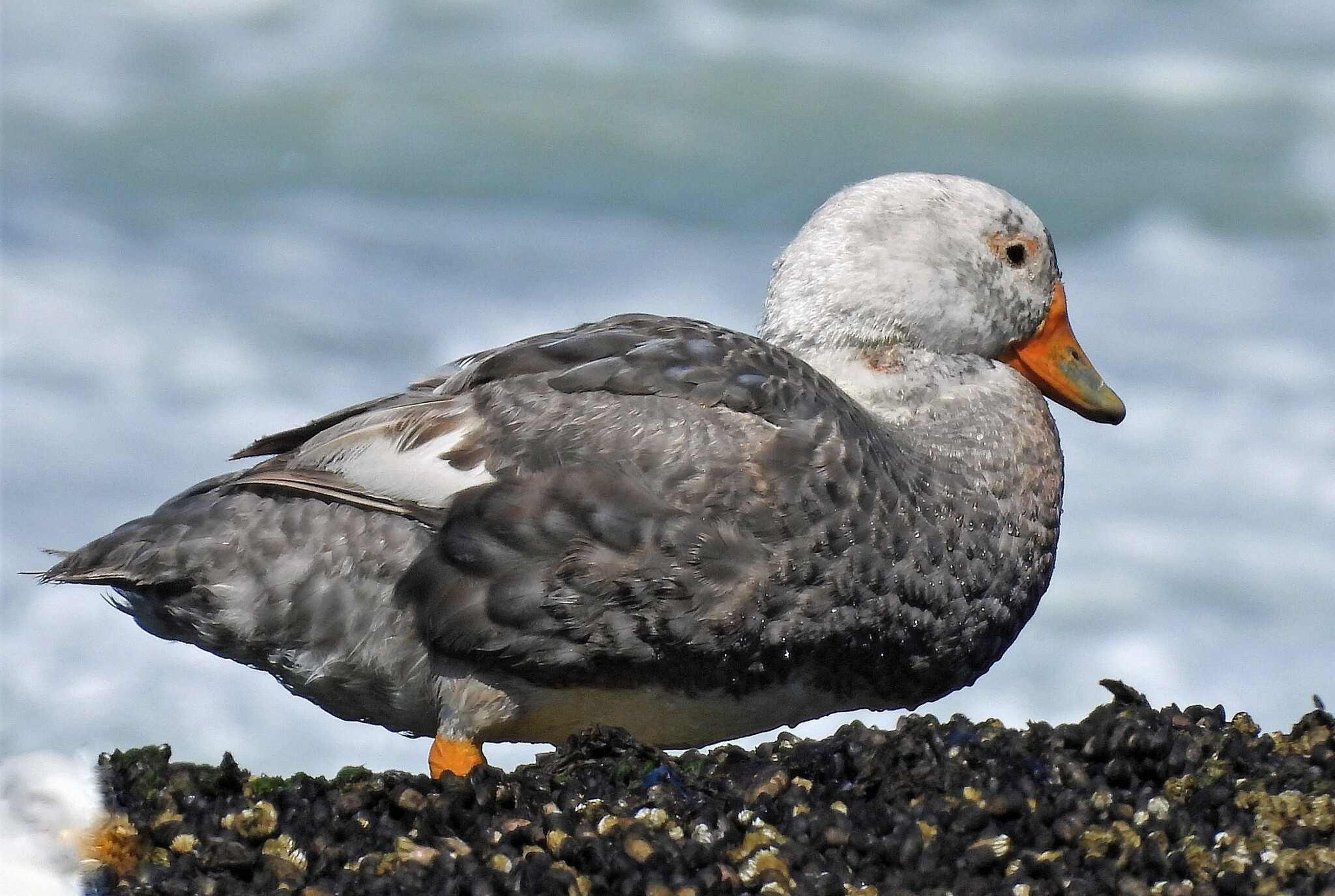
Chubut steamer duck

Order: Anseriformes Family: Anatidae

Anatidae includes the ducks and most duck-like waterfowl, such as geese and swans. These birds are adapted to an aquatic existence with webbed feet, flattened bills, and feathers that are excellent at shedding water due to an oily coating.

- Fulvous whistling-duck, Dendrocygna bicolor
- White-faced whistling-duck, Dendrocygna viduata
- Black-bellied whistling-duck, Dendrocygna autumnalis
- Graylag goose, Anser anser (I)
- Black-necked swan, Cygnus melancoryphus
- Coscoroba swan, Coscoroba coscoroba
- Orinoco goose, Oressochen jubatus
- Andean goose, Oressochen melanopterus
- Upland goose, Chloephaga picta
- Kelp goose, Chloephaga hybrida
- Ashy-headed goose, Chloephaga poliocephala
- Ruddy-headed goose, Chloephaga rubidiceps
- Ruddy shelduck, Tadorna ferruginea (UC)(V)
- Muscovy duck, Cairina moschata
- Comb duck, Sarkidiornis sylvicola
- Ringed teal, Callonetta leucophrys
- Brazilian teal, Amazonetta brasiliensis
- Torrent duck, Merganetta armata
- Flying steamer-duck, Tachyeres patachonicus
- Flightless steamer-duck, Tachyeres pteneres
- White-headed steamer-duck, Tachyeres leucocephalus (E)
- Crested duck, Lophonetta specularioides
- Spectacled duck, Speculanas specularis
- Puna teal, Spatula puna
- Silver teal, Spatula versicolor
- Red shoveler, Spatula platalea
- Northern shoveler, Spatula clypeata (V)
- Blue-winged teal, Spatula discors (V)
- Cinnamon teal, Spatula cyanoptera
- Chiloe wigeon, Mareca sibilatrix
- White-cheeked pintail, Anas bahamensis
- Yellow-billed pintail, Anas georgica
- Yellow-billed teal, Anas flavirostris
- Southern pochard, Netta erythrophthalma (U)
- Rosy-billed pochard, Netta peposaca
- Brazilian merganser, Mergus octosetaceus (extirpated)
- Black-headed duck, Heteronetta atricapilla
- Masked duck, Nomonyx dominicus
- Ruddy duck, Oxyura jamaicensis
- Lake duck, Oxyura vittata

== Guans ==
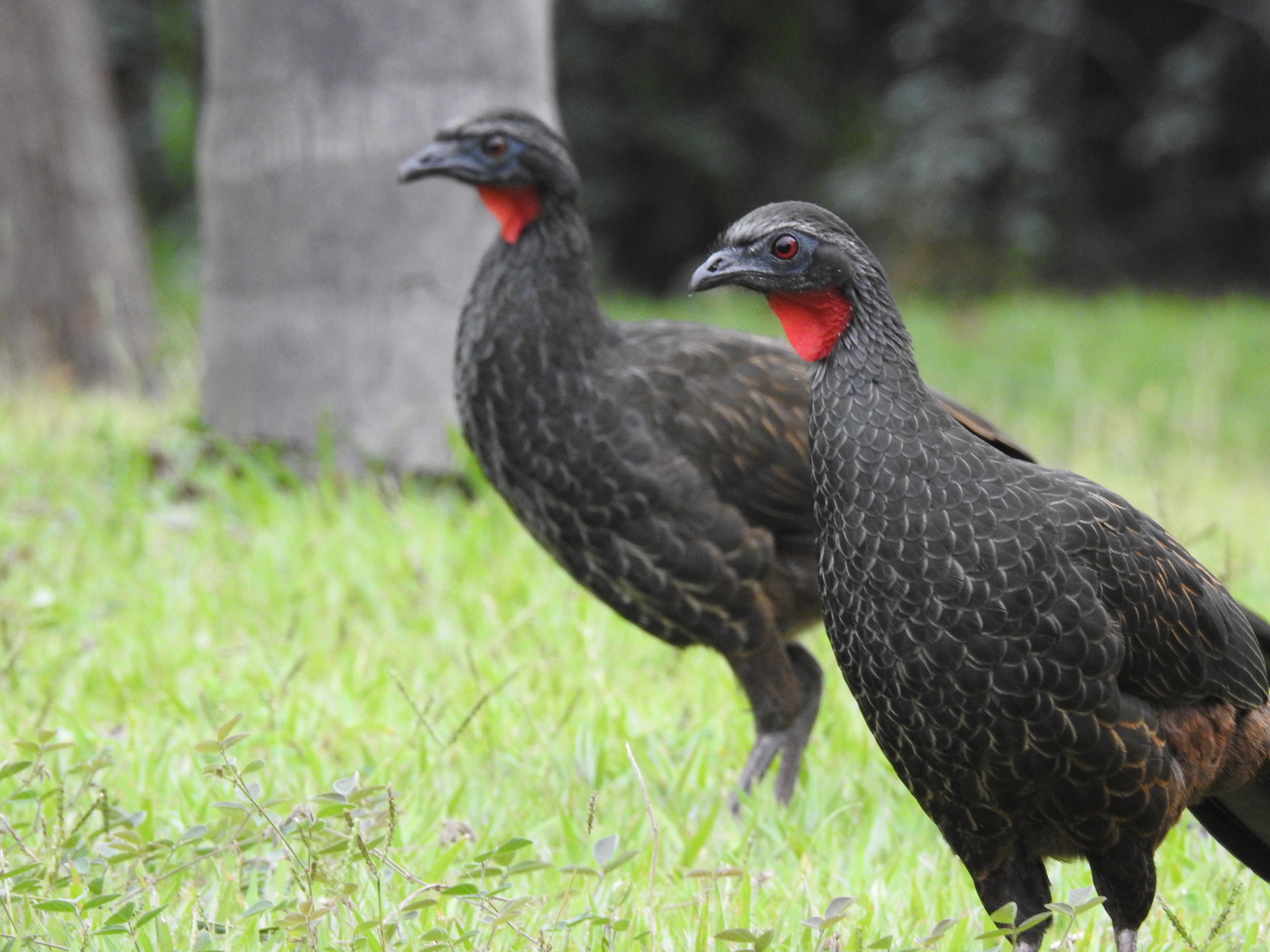
Rusty-margined guan

Order: Galliformes Family: Cracidae

The Cracidae are large birds, similar in general appearance to turkeys. The guans and curassows live in trees, but the smaller chachalacas are found in more open scrubby habitats. They are generally dull-plumaged, but the curassows and some guans have colorful facial ornaments.

- Rusty-margined guan, Penelope superciliaris
- Red-faced guan, Penelope dabbenei
- Yungas guan, Penelope bridgesi
- Dusky-legged guan, Penelope obscura
- Black-fronted piping-guan, Pipile jacutinga
- Chaco chachalaca, Ortalis canicollis
- Bare-faced curassow, Crax fasciolata

== New World quails ==
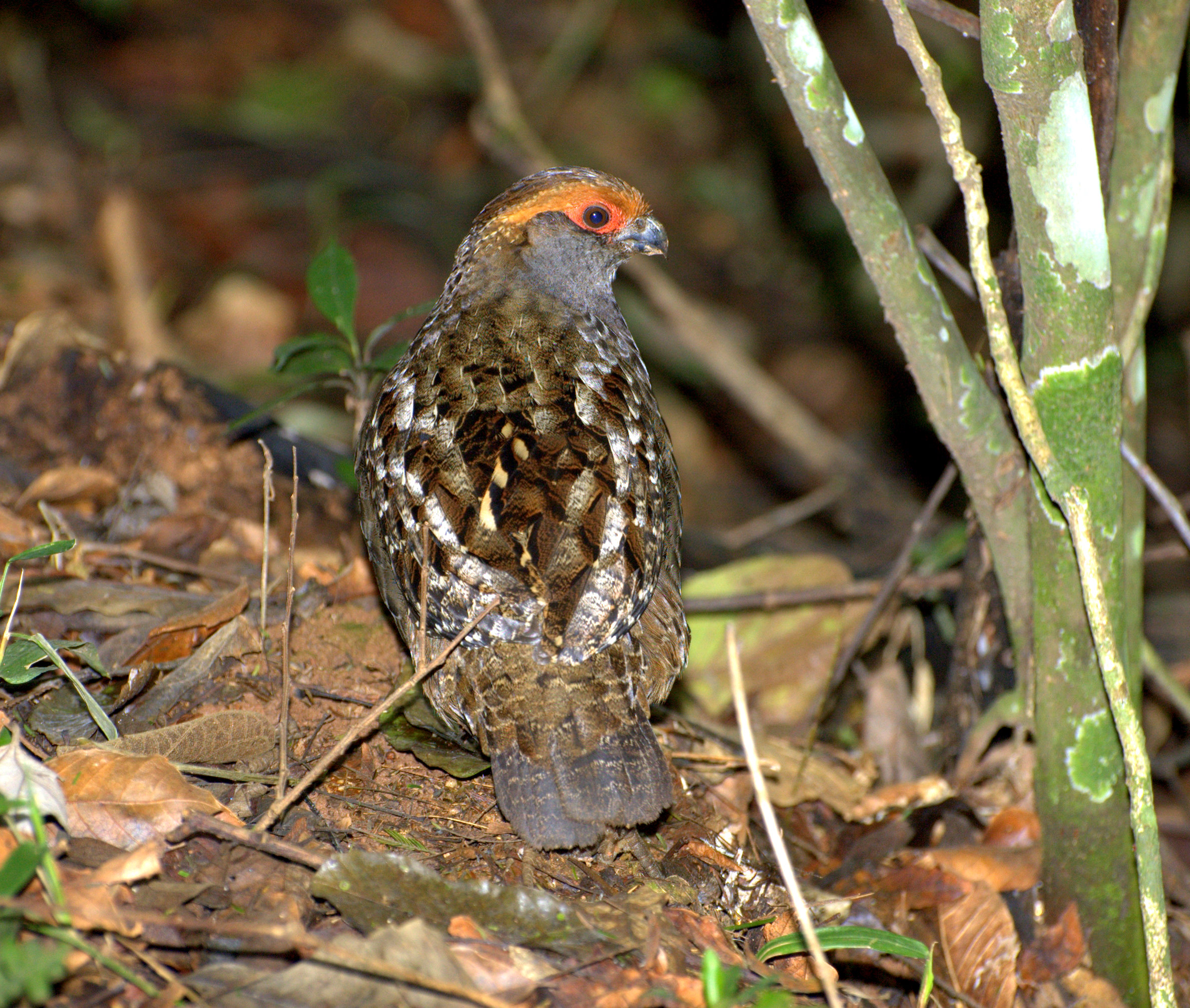
Spot-winged wood quail

Order: Galliformes Family: Odontophoridae

The New World quails are small, plump terrestrial birds only distantly related to the quails of the Old World, but named for their similar appearance and habits.

- California quail, Callipepla californica (I)
- Spot-winged wood-quail, Odontophorus capueira

== Pheasants ==
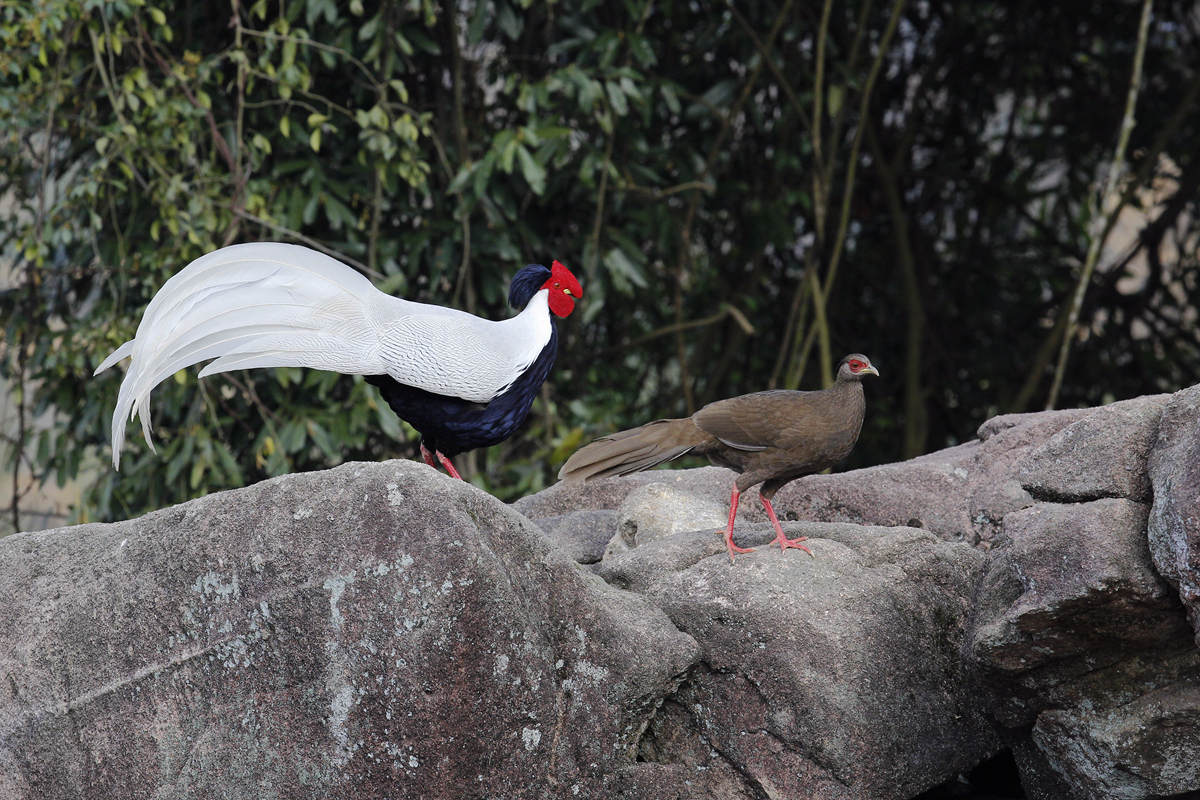
Silver pheasant

Order: Galliformes Family: Phasianidae

Phasianidae consists of the pheasants and their allies. These are terrestrial species, variable in size but generally plump with broad relatively short wings. Many species are gamebirds or have been domesticated as a food source for humans.

- Silver pheasant, Lophura nycthemera (I)

== Flamingos ==
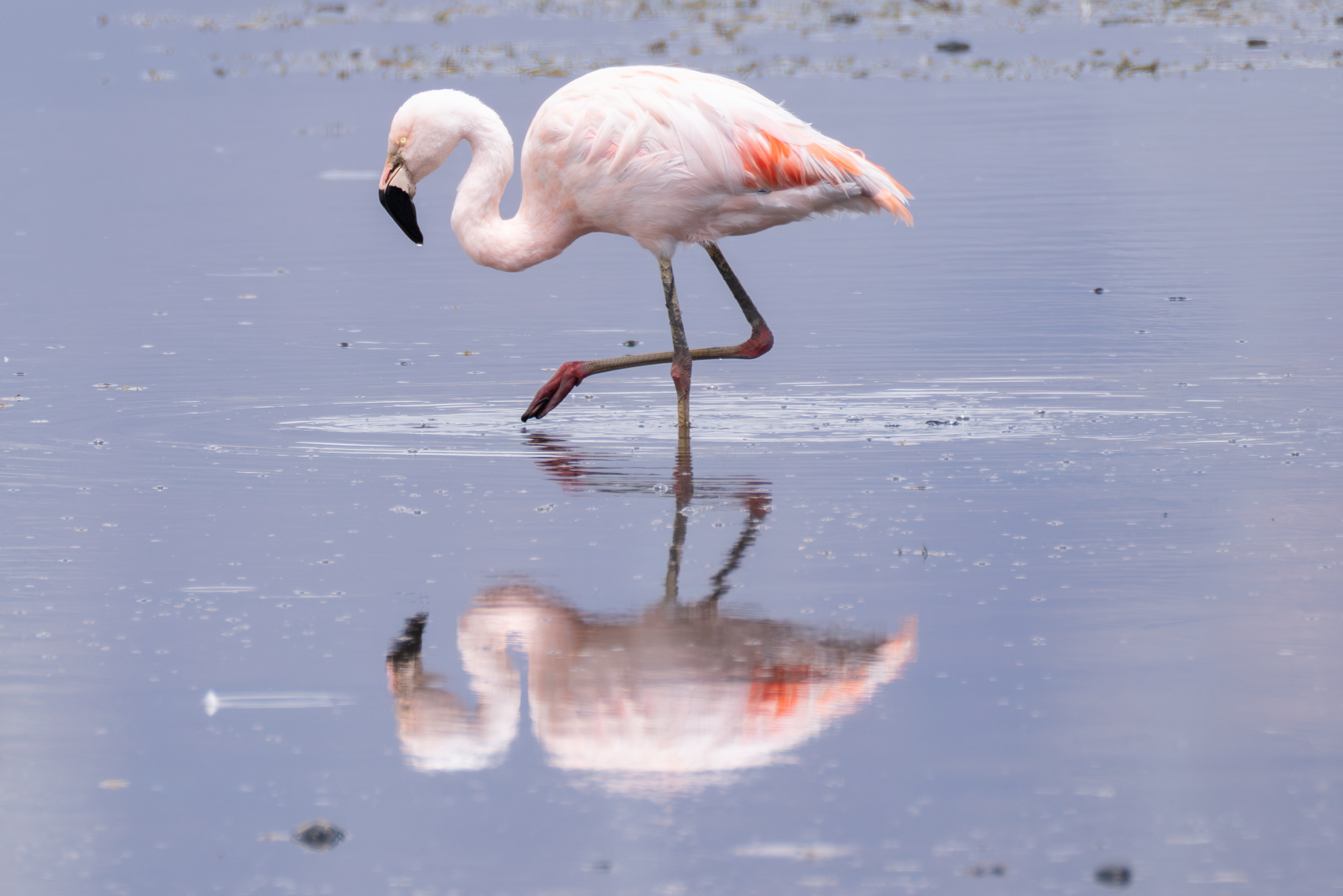
Chilean flamingo

Order: Phoenicopteriformes Family: Phoenicopteridae

Flamingos are gregarious wading birds, usually 3 to 5 feet (0.9 to 1.5 m) tall, found in both the Western and Eastern Hemispheres. Flamingos filter-feed on shellfish and algae. Their oddly shaped beaks are specially adapted to separate mud and silt from the food they consume and, uniquely, are used upside-down.

- Chilean flamingo, Phoenicopterus chilensis
- Andean flamingo, Phoenicoparrus andinus
- James's flamingo, Phoenicoparrus jamesi

== Grebes ==
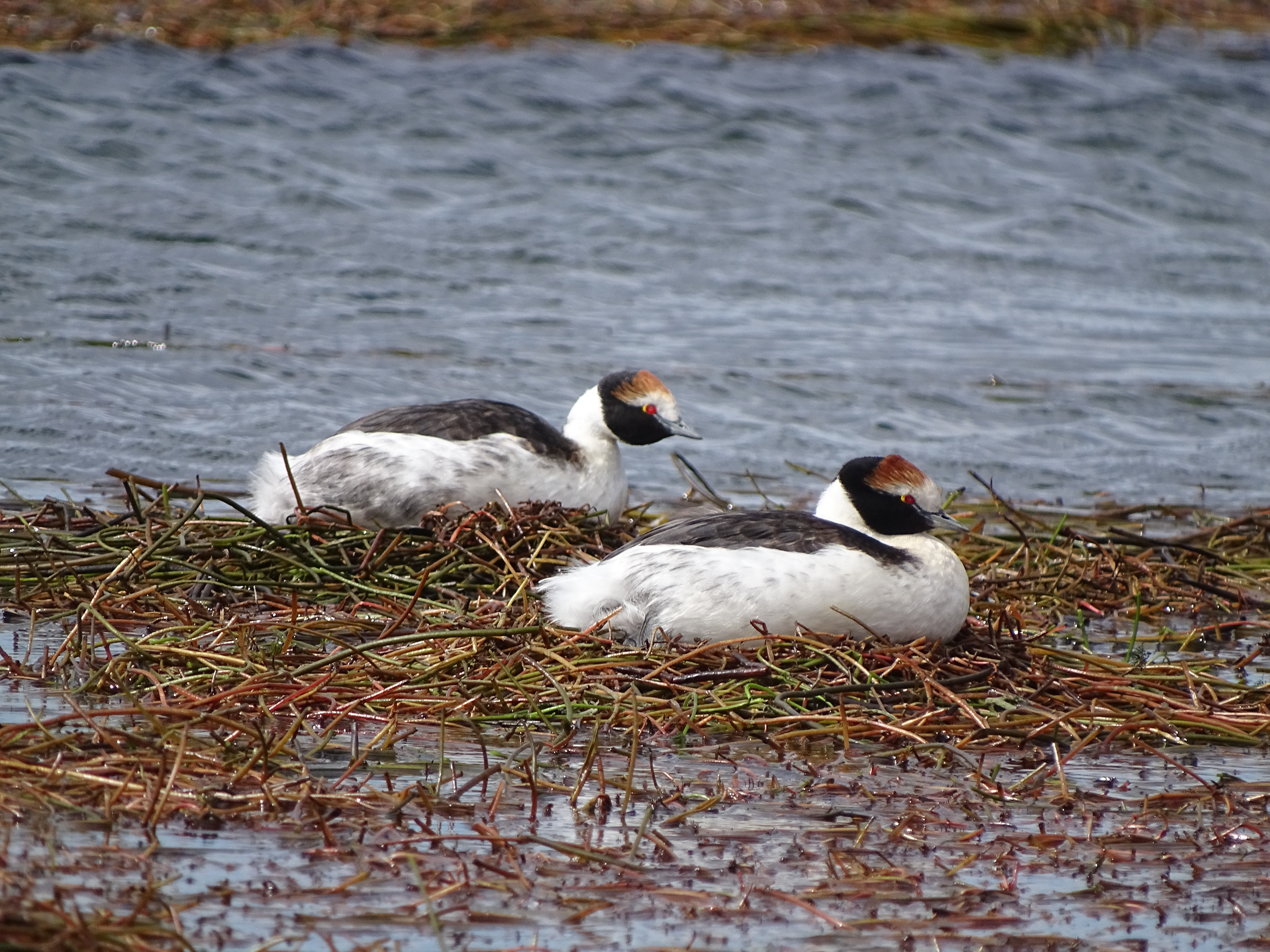
Hooded grebe

Order: Podicipediformes Family: Podicipedidae

Grebes are small to medium-large freshwater diving birds. They have lobed toes and are excellent swimmers and divers. However, they have their feet placed far back on the body, making them quite ungainly on land.

- White-tufted grebe, Rollandia rolland
- Least grebe, Tachybaptus dominicus
- Pied-billed grebe, Podilymbus podiceps
- Great grebe, Podiceps major
- Silvery grebe, Podiceps occipitalis
- Hooded grebe, Podiceps gallardoi (E)

== Pigeons ==
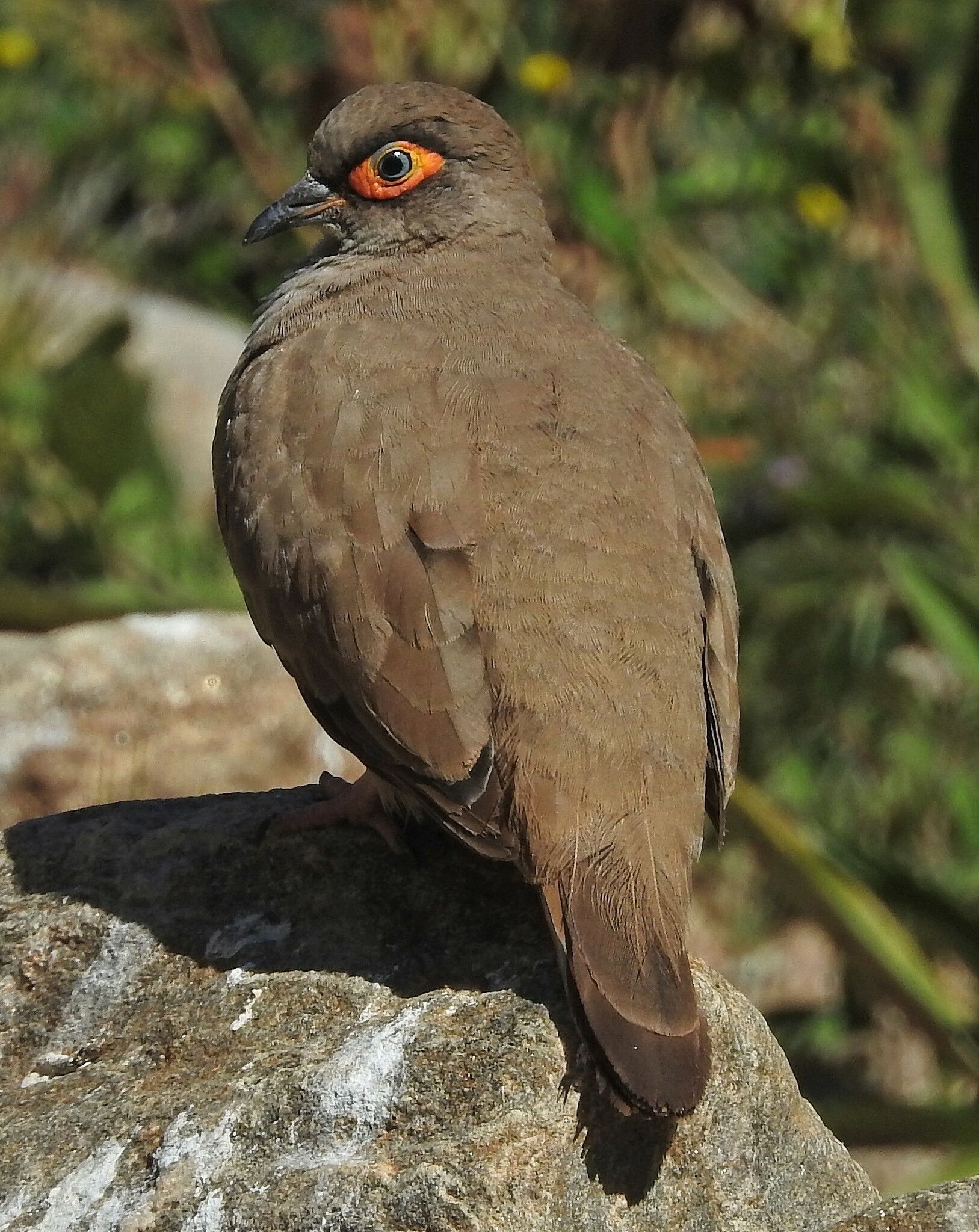
Moreno's ground dove

Order: Columbiformes Family: Columbidae

Pigeons and doves are stout-bodied birds with short necks and short slender bills with a fleshy cere.

- Rock pigeon, Columba livia (I)
- Scaled pigeon, Patagioenas speciosa (V)
- Picazuro pigeon, Patagioenas picazuro
- Spot-winged pigeon, Patagioenas maculosa
- Band-tailed pigeon, Patagioenas fasciata
- Chilean pigeon, Patagioenas araucana
- Pale-vented pigeon, Patagioenas cayennensis
- Plumbeous pigeon, Patagioenas plumbea (V)
- Ruddy quail-dove, Geotrygon montana
- Violaceous quail-dove, Geotrygon violacea
- White-tipped dove, Leptotila verreauxi
- Gray-fronted dove, Leptotila rufaxilla
- Large-tailed dove, Leptotila megalura
- White-throated quail-dove, Zentrygon frenata
- West Peruvian dove, Zenaida meloda
- Eared dove, Zenaida auriculata
- Blue ground dove, Claravis pretiosa
- Purple-winged ground dove, Paraclaravis geoffroyi
- Bare-faced ground dove, Metriopelia ceciliae
- Bare-eyed ground dove, Metriopelia morenoi (E)
- Black-winged ground dove, Metriopelia melanoptera
- Golden-spotted ground dove, Metriopelia aymara
- Plain-breasted ground dove, Columbina minuta (V)
- Ruddy ground dove, Columbina talpacoti
- Scaled dove, Columbina squammata
- Picui ground dove, Columbina picui

== Cuckoos ==
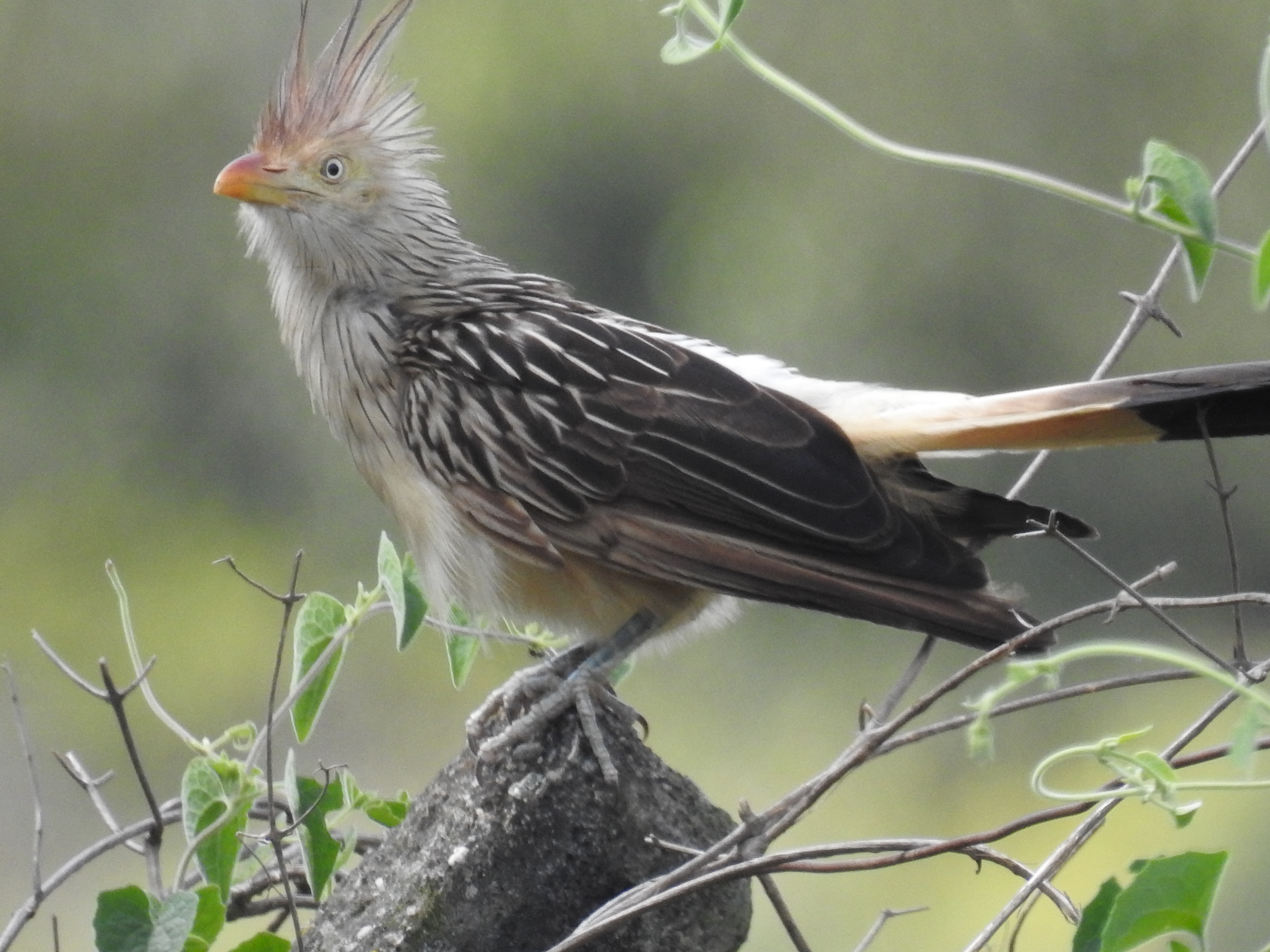
Guira cuckoo

Order: Cuculiformes Family: Cuculidae

The family Cuculidae includes cuckoos, roadrunners and anis. These birds are of variable size with slender bodies, long tails and strong legs. The Old World cuckoos are brood parasites.

- Guira cuckoo, Guira guira
- Greater ani, Crotophaga major
- Smooth-billed ani, Crotophaga ani
- Groove-billed ani, Crotophaga sulcirostris (V)
- Striped cuckoo, Tapera naevia
- Pheasant cuckoo, Dromococcyx phasianellus
- Pavonine cuckoo, Dromococcyx pavoninus
- Ash-colored cuckoo, Coccycua cinerea
- Squirrel cuckoo, Piaya cayana
- Dark-billed cuckoo, Coccyzus melacoryphus
- Yellow-billed cuckoo, Coccyzus americanus
- Pearly-breasted cuckoo, Coccyzus euleri
- Black-billed cuckoo, Coccyzus erythropthalmus (V)

== Potoos ==
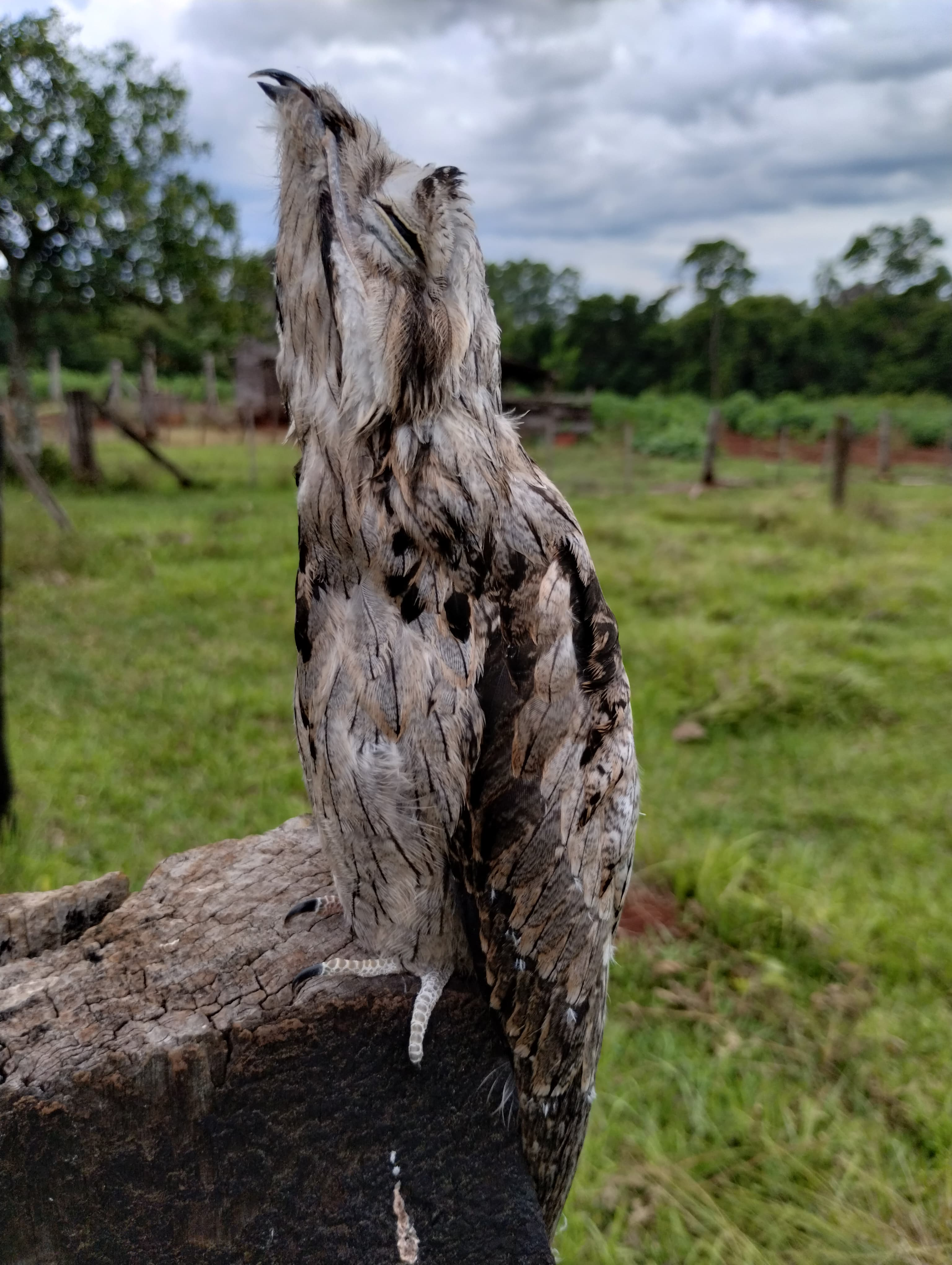
Long-tailed potoo

Order: Nyctibiiformes Family: Nyctibiidae

The potoos (sometimes called poor-me-ones) are large near passerine birds related to the nightjars and frogmouths. They are nocturnal insectivores which lack the bristles around the mouth found in the true nightjars.

- Long-tailed potoo, Nyctibius aethereus
- Common potoo, Nyctibius griseus

== Nightjars ==
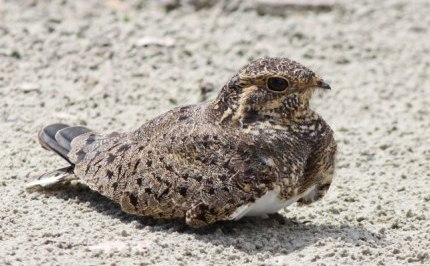
Nacunda nighthawk

Order: Caprimulgiformes Family: Caprimulgidae

Nightjars are medium-sized nocturnal birds that usually nest on the ground. They have long wings, short legs, and very short bills. Most have small feet, of little use for walking, and long pointed wings. Their soft plumage is camouflaged to resemble bark or leaves.

- Nacunda nighthawk, Chordeiles nacunda
- Least nighthawk, Chordeiles pusillus
- Lesser nighthawk, Chordeiles acutipennis (U)
- Common nighthawk, Chordeiles minor
- Antillean nighthawk, Chordeiles gundlachii
- Short-tailed nighthawk, Lurocalis semitorquatus
- Common pauraque, Nyctidromus albicollis
- Lyre-tailed nightjar, Uropsalis lyra
- Band-winged nightjar, Systellura longirostris
- Sickle-winged nightjar, Eleothreptus anomalus
- Little nightjar, Setopagis parvulus
- Spot-tailed nightjar, Hydropsalis maculicaudus
- Long-trained nightjar, Hydropsalis forcipata
- Scissor-tailed nightjar, Hydropsalis torquata
- Ocellated poorwill, Nyctiphrynus ocellatus
- Silky-tailed nightjar, Antrostomus sericocaudatus
- Rufous nightjar, Antrostomus rufus

== Swifts ==
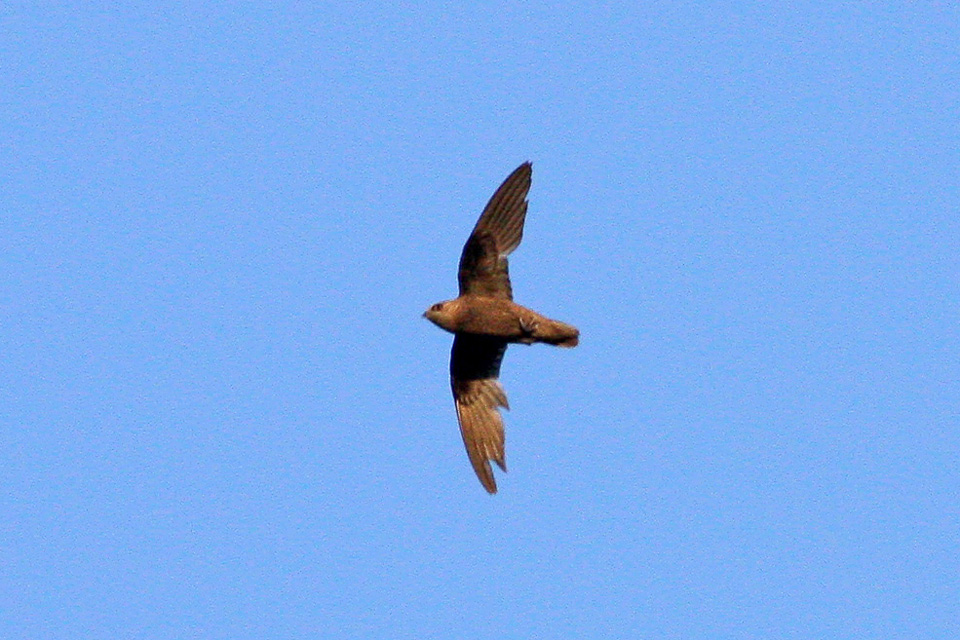
Great dusky swift

Order: Apodiformes Family: Apodidae

Swifts are small birds which spend the majority of their lives flying. These birds have very short legs and never settle voluntarily on the ground, perching instead only on vertical surfaces. Many swifts have long swept-back wings which resemble a crescent or boomerang.

- Rothschild's swift, Cypseloides rothschildi
- Sooty swift, Cypseloides fumigatus
- Great dusky swift, Cypseloides senex
- White-collared swift, Streptoprocne zonaris
- Biscutate swift, Streptoprocne biscutata
- Gray-rumped swift, Chaetura cinereiventris
- Chimney swift, Chaetura pelagica (V)
- Sick's swift, Chaetura meridionalis
- White-tipped swift, Aeronautes montivagus
- Andean swift, Aeronautes andecolus
- Fork-tailed palm-swift, Tachornis squamata (V)

== Hummingbirds ==
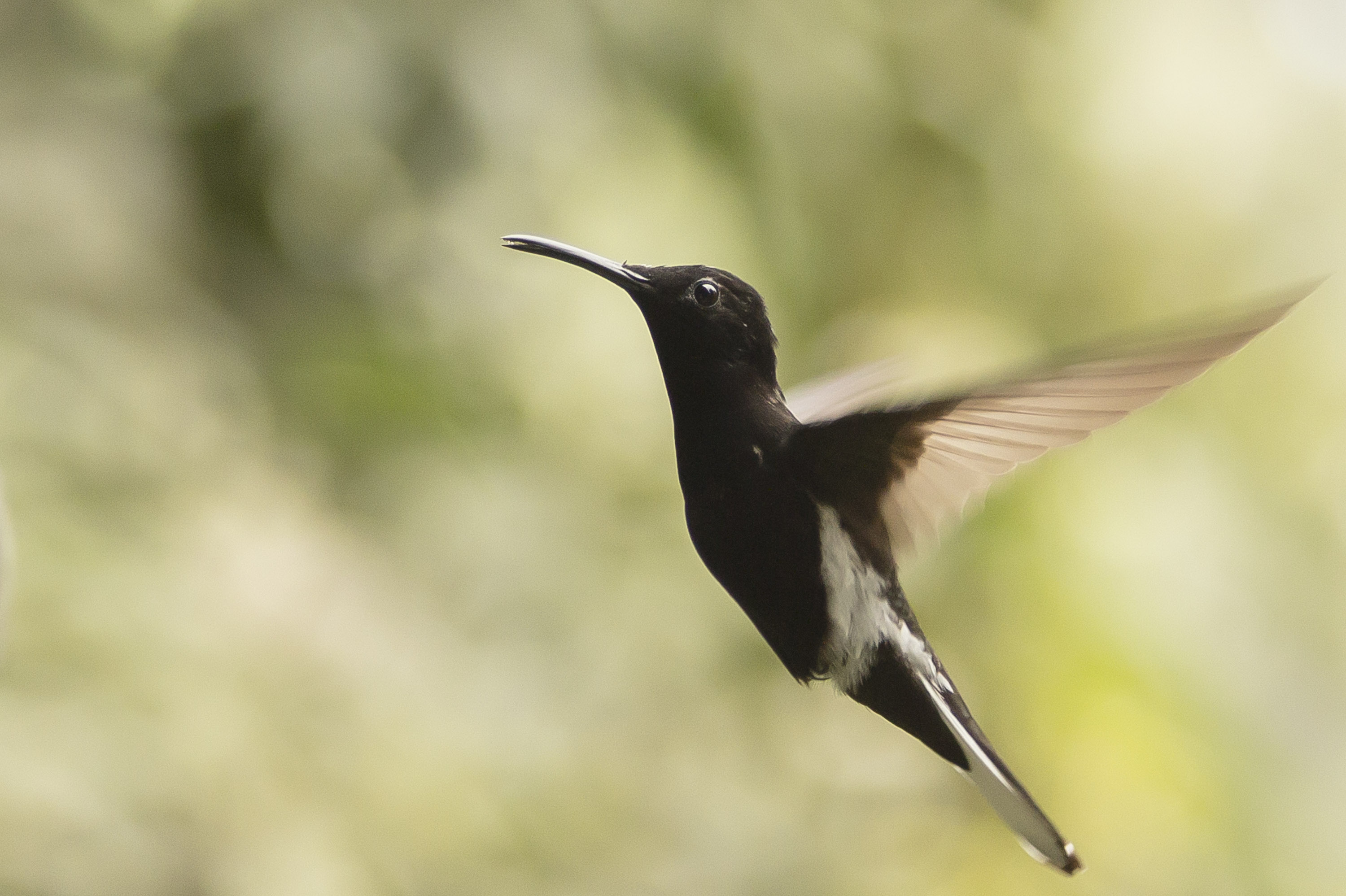
Black jacobin

Order: Apodiformes Family: Trochilidae

Hummingbirds are small birds capable of hovering in mid-air due to the rapid flapping of their wings. They are the only birds that can fly backwards.

- White-necked jacobin, Florisuga mellivora (V)
- Black jacobin, Florisuga fusca
- Planalto hermit, Phaethornis pretrei
- Scale-throated hermit, Phaethornis eurynome
- Sparkling violetear, Colibri coruscans
- White-vented violetear, Colibri serrirostris
- White-tailed goldenthroat, Polytmus guainumbi
- Ruby-topaz hummingbird, Chrysolampis mosquitus (V)
- Black-throated mango, Anthracothorax nigricollis
- Green-backed firecrown, Sephanoides sephaniodes
- Festive coquette, Lophornis chalybeus (U)
- Speckled hummingbird, Adelomyia melanogenys
- Red-tailed comet, Sappho sparganurus
- Andean hillstar, Oreotrochilus estella
- White-sided hillstar, Oreotrochilus leucopleurus
- Wedge-tailed hillstar, Oreotrochilus adela
- Blue-capped puffleg, Eriocnemis glaucopoides
- Southern giant-hummingbird, Patagona gigas
- Long-billed starthroat, Heliomaster longirostris (V)
- Stripe-breasted starthroat, Heliomaster squamosus (V)
- Blue-tufted starthroat, Heliomaster furcifer
- Slender-tailed woodstar, Microstilbon burmeisteri
- Amethyst woodstar, Calliphlox amethystina
- Glittering-bellied emerald, Chlorostilbon lucidus
- Purple-crowned plovercrest, Stephanoxis loddigesii
- Fork-tailed woodnymph, Thalurania furcata
- Violet-capped woodnymph, Thalurania glaucopis
- Many-spotted hummingbird, Taphrospilus hypostictus (U)
- Swallow-tailed hummingbird, Eupetomena macroura
- Versicolored emerald, Chrysuronia versicolor
- White-throated hummingbird, Leucochloris albicollis
- Sapphire-spangled emerald, Chionomesa lactea (V)
- Rufous-throated sapphire, Hylocharis sapphirina (U)
- Gilded hummingbird, Hylocharis chrysura
- White-bellied hummingbird, Elliotomyia chionogaster
- White-chinned sapphire, Chlorestes cyanus (V)

== Limpkin ==
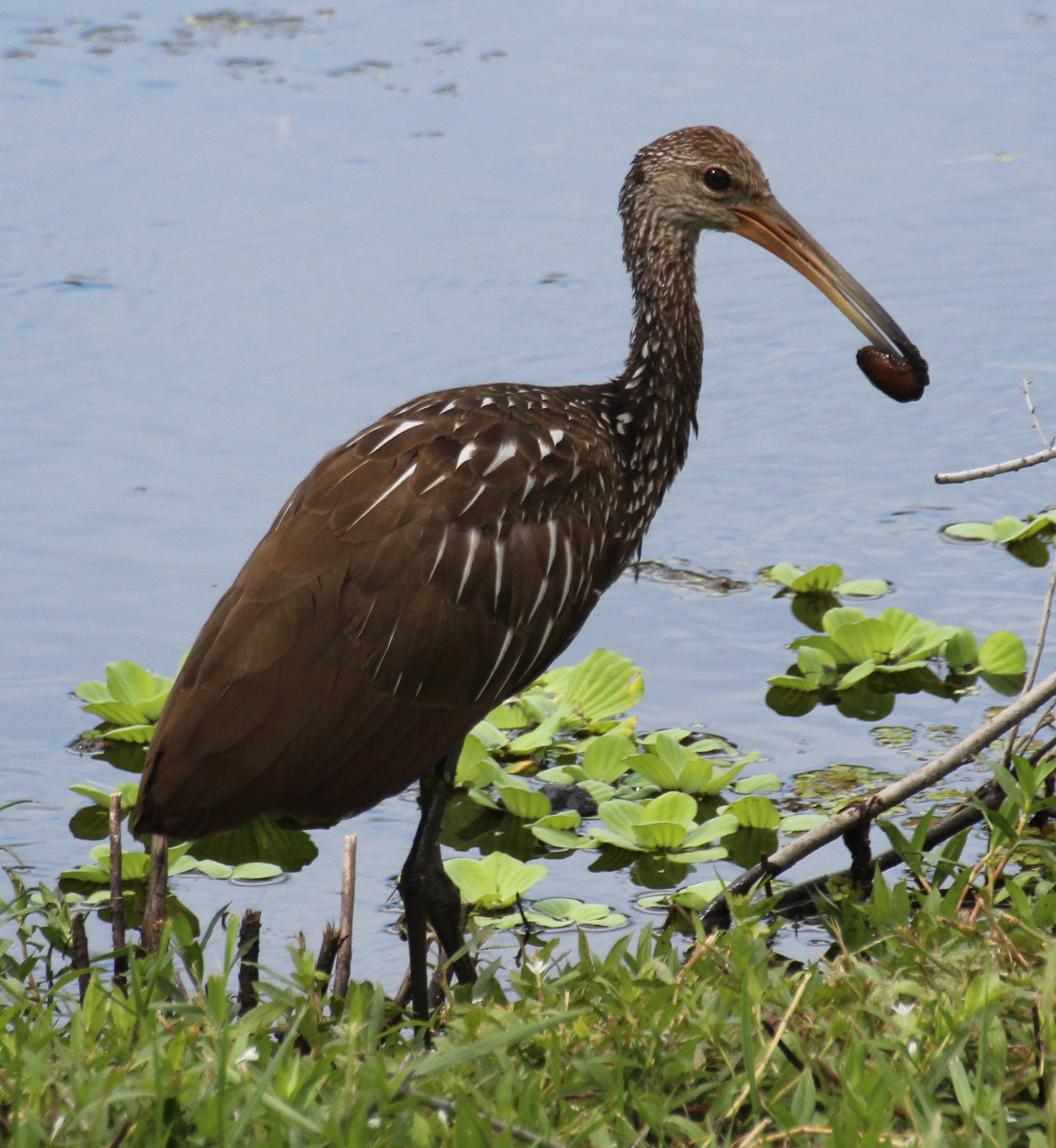
Limpkin

Order: Gruiformes Family: Aramidae

The limpkin resembles a large rail. It has drab-brown plumage and a grayer head and neck.

- Limpkin, Aramus guarauna

== Rails ==
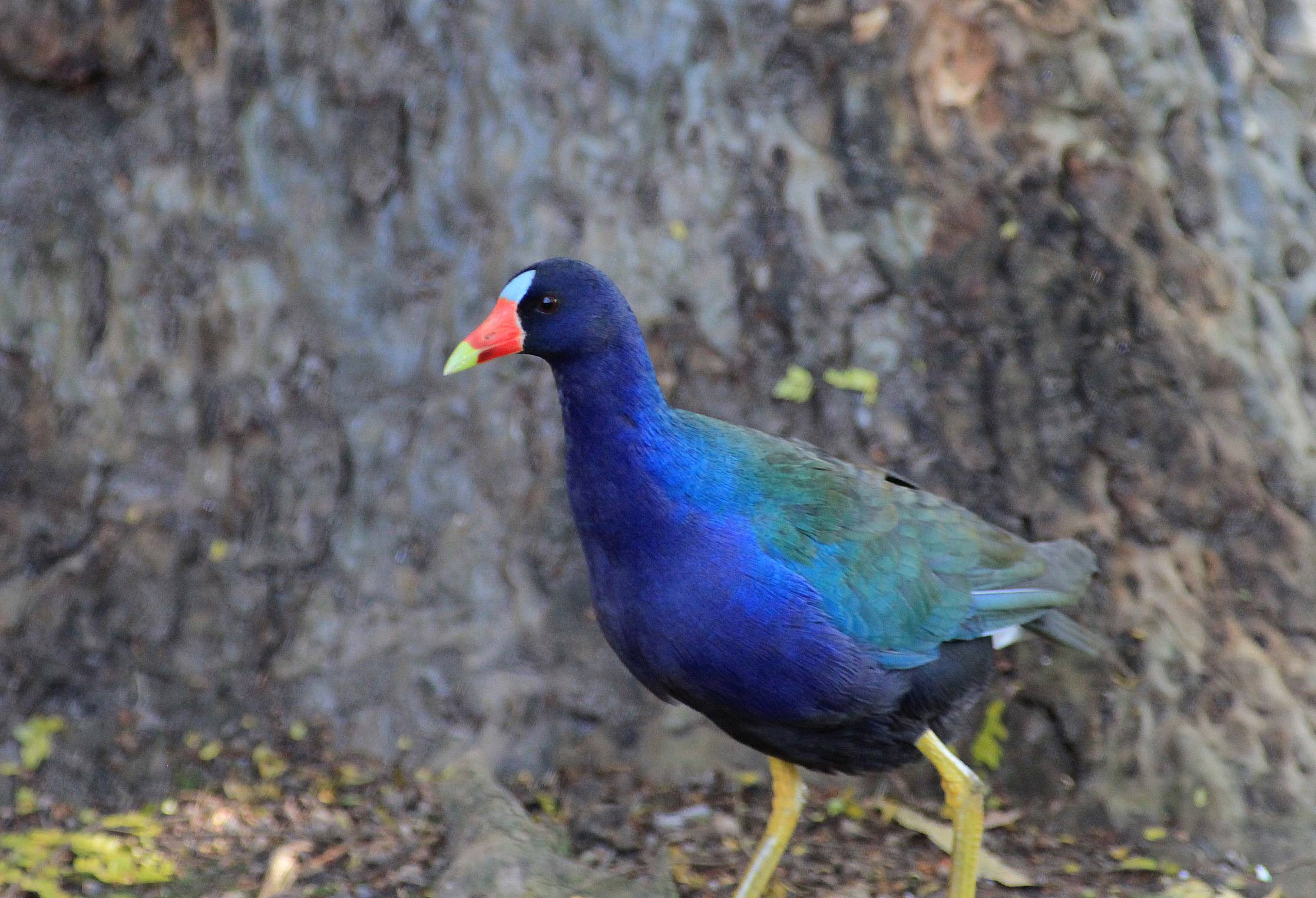
Purple gallinule

Order: Gruiformes Family: Rallidae

Rallidae is a large family of small to medium-sized birds which includes the rails, crakes, coots, and gallinules. Typically they inhabit dense vegetation in damp environments near lakes, swamps or rivers. In general they are shy and secretive birds, making them difficult to observe. Most species have strong legs and long toes which are well adapted to soft uneven surfaces. They tend to have short, rounded wings and to be weak fliers.

- Austral rail, Rallus antarcticus
- Purple gallinule, Porphyrio martinica
- Azure gallinule, Porphyrio flavirostris
- Rufous-sided crake, Laterallus melanophaius
- Gray-breasted crake, Laterallus exilis
- Red-and-white crake, Laterallus leucopyrrhus
- Speckled rail, Coturnicops notatus
- Ocellated crake, Micropygia schomburgkii
- Ash-throated crake, Mustelirallus albicollis
- Paint-billed crake, Mustelirallus erythrops
- Spotted rail, Pardirallus maculatus
- Blackish rail, Pardirallus nigricans
- Plumbeous rail, Pardirallus sanguinolentus
- Giant wood rail, Aramides ypecaha
- Gray-cowled wood-rail, Aramides cajaneus
- Slaty-breasted wood-rail, Aramides saracura
- Spot-flanked gallinule, Porphyriops melanops
- Yellow-breasted crake, Porzana flaviventer
- Dot-winged crake, Porzana spiloptera
- Common gallinule, Gallinula galeata
- Red-fronted coot, Fulica rufifrons
- Horned coot, Fulica cornuta
- Giant coot, Fulica gigantea
- Red-gartered coot, Fulica armillata
- Slate-colored coot, Fulica ardesiaca
- White-winged coot, Fulica leucoptera

== Cranes ==
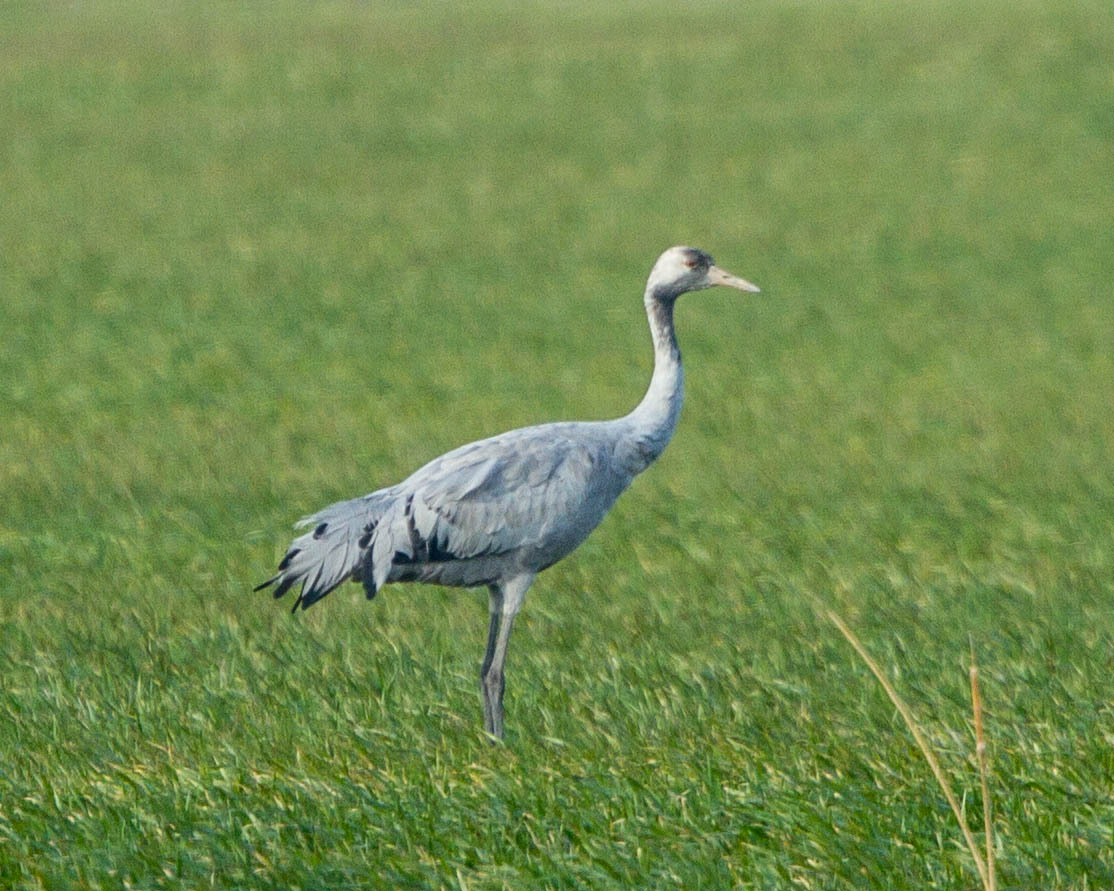
Common crane

Order: Gruiformes Family: Gruidae

Cranes are large, long-legged and long-necked birds. Unlike the similar-looking but unrelated herons, cranes fly with necks outstretched, not pulled back. Most have elaborate and noisy courting displays or "dances".

- Common crane, Grus grus (UC)(V)

== Finfoots ==
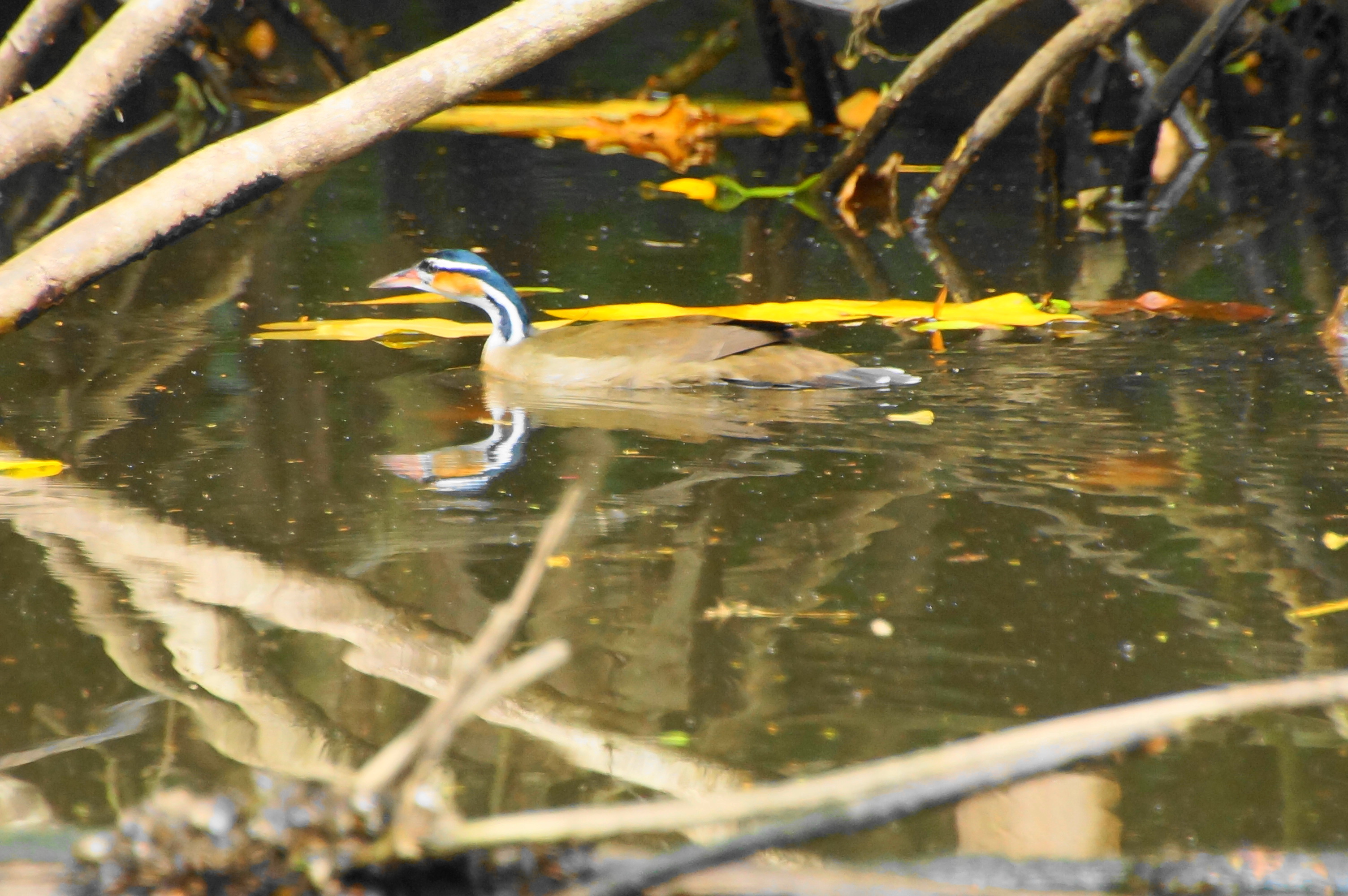
Sungrebe

Order: Gruiformes Family: Heliornithidae

Heliornithidae is a small family of tropical birds with webbed lobes on their feet similar to those of grebes and coots.

- Sungrebe, Heliornis fulica

== Plovers ==
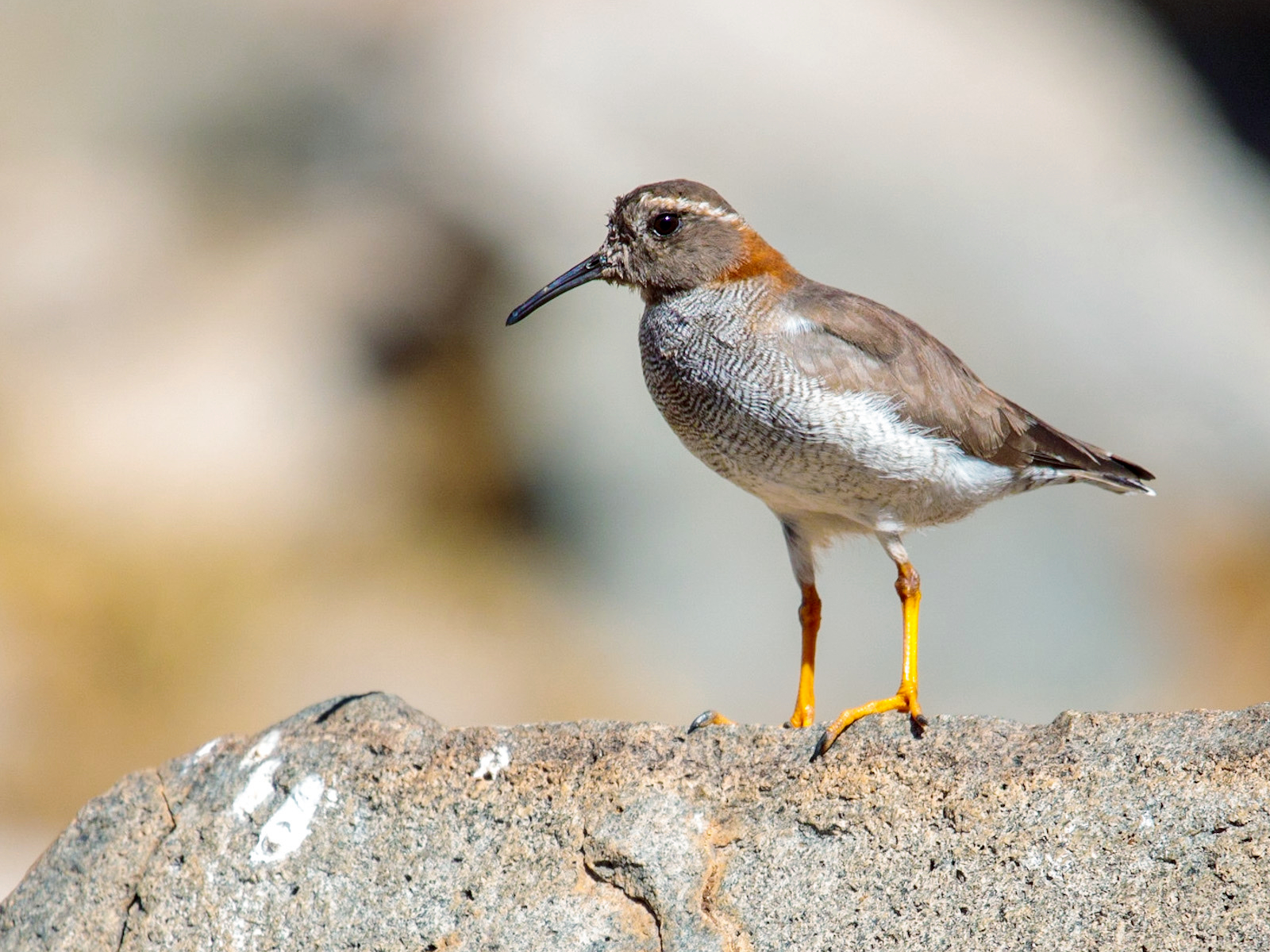
Diademed sandpiper-plover

Order: Charadriiformes Family: Charadriidae

The family Charadriidae includes the plovers, dotterels, and lapwings. They are small to medium-sized birds with compact bodies, short, thick necks and long, usually pointed, wings. They are found in open country worldwide, mostly in habitats near water.

- Black-bellied plover, Pluvialis squatarola
- American golden-plover, Pluvialis dominica
- Tawny-throated dotterel, Oreopholus ruficollis
- Pied lapwing, Hoploxypterus cayanus (V)
- Diademed sandpiper-plover, Phegornis mitchellii
- Rufous-chested dotterel, Zonibyx modestus
- Killdeer, Charadrius vociferus (V)
- Semipalmated plover, Charadrius semipalmatus
- Southern lapwing, Vanellus chilensis
- Andean lapwing, Vanellus resplendens
- Lesser sand-plover, Anarynchus mongolus (V)
- Wilson's plover, Anarynchus wilsonia (U)
- Collared plover, Anarynchus collaris
- Puna plover, Anarynchus alticola
- Two-banded plover, Anarynchus falklandicus

== Oystercatchers ==
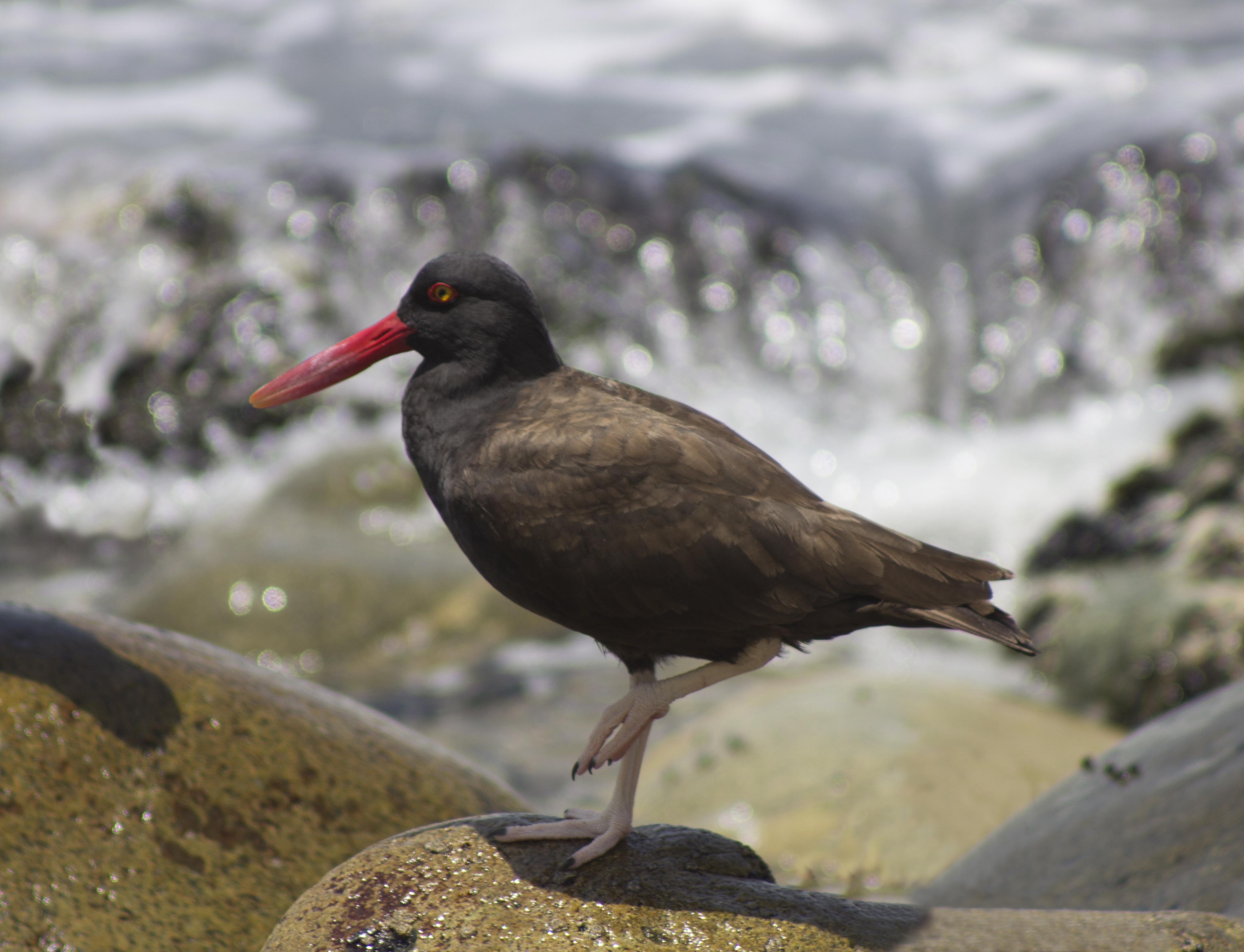
Blackish oystercatcher

Order: Charadriiformes Family: Haematopodidae

The oystercatchers are large and noisy plover-like birds, with strong bills used for smashing or prising open molluscs.

- American oystercatcher, Haematopus palliatus
- Blackish oystercatcher, Haematopus ater
- Magellanic oystercatcher, Haematopus leucopodus

== Avocets and stilts ==
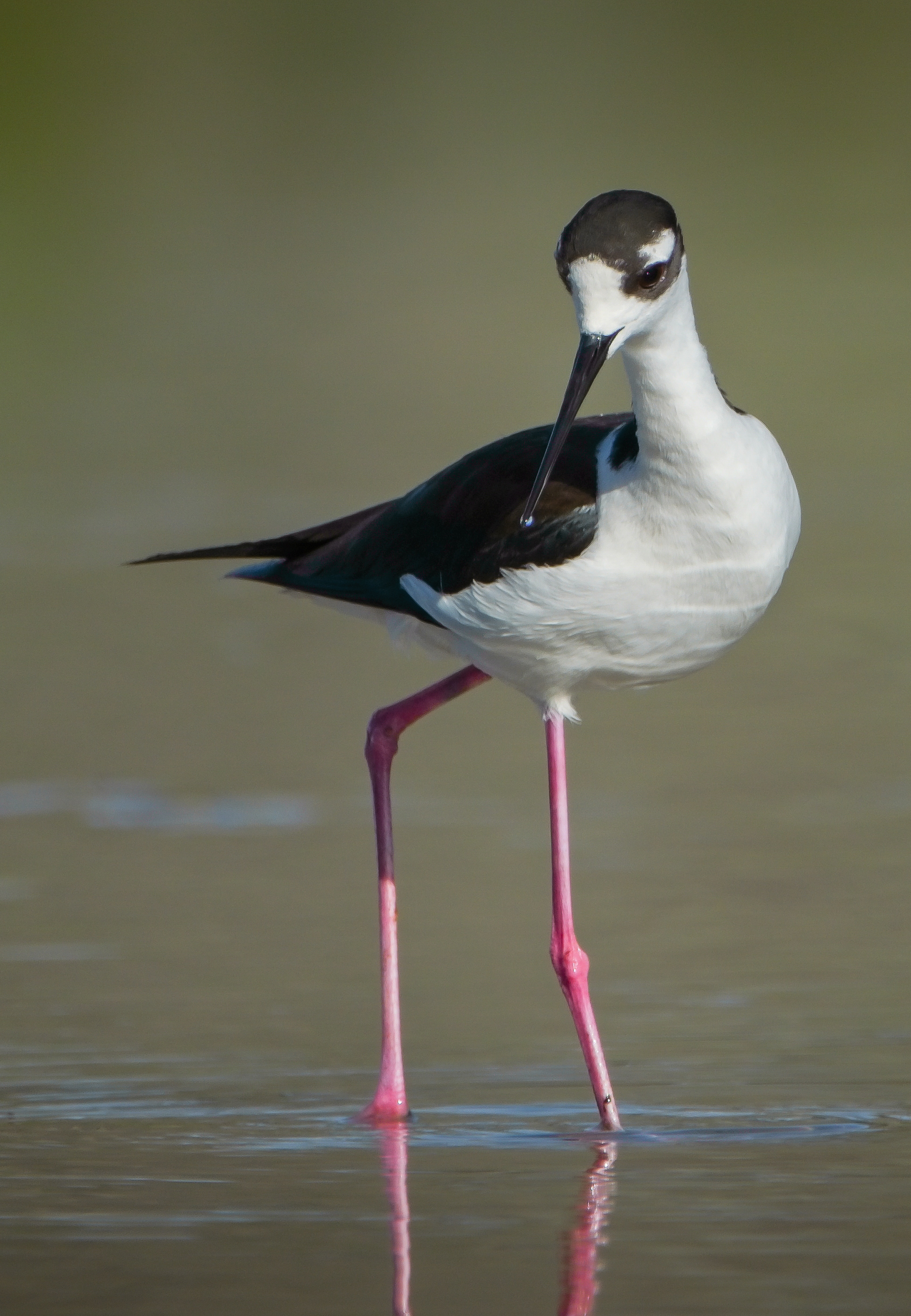
Black-necked stilt

Order: Charadriiformes Family: Recurvirostridae

Recurvirostridae is a family of large wading birds, which includes the avocets and stilts. The avocets have long legs and long up-curved bills. The stilts have extremely long legs and long, thin, straight bills.

- Black-necked stilt, Himantopus mexicanus
- Andean avocet, Recurvirostra andina

== Thick-knees ==
Order: Charadriiformes Family: Burhinidae

The thick-knees are a group of waders found worldwide within the tropical zone, with some species also breeding in temperate Europe and Australia. They are medium to large waders with strong black or yellow-black bills, large yellow eyes, and cryptic plumage. Despite being classed as waders, most species have a preference for arid or semi-arid habitats.

- Peruvian thick-knee, Hesperoburhinus superciliaris (U)

== Sheathbills ==
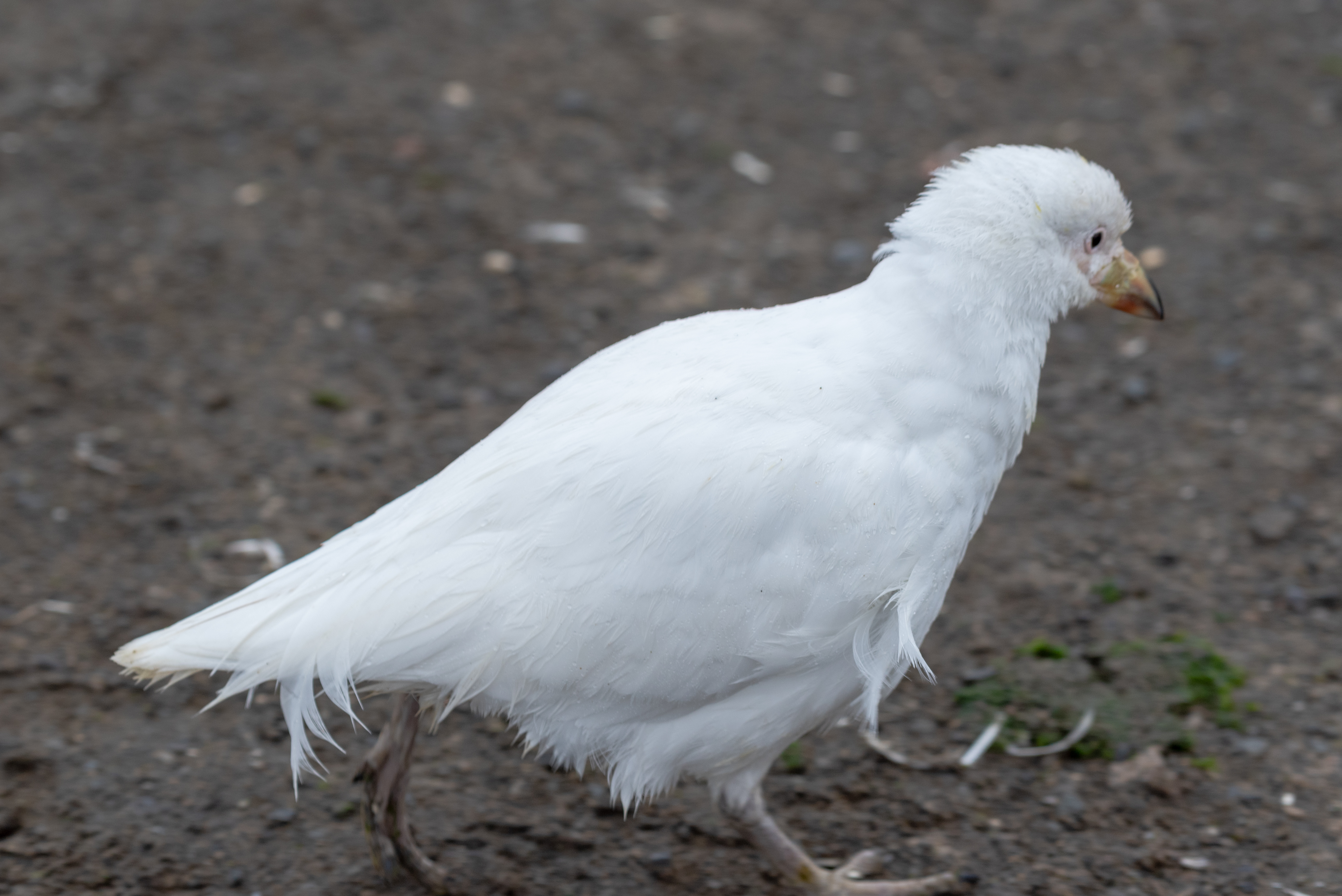
Snowy sheathbill

Order: Charadriiformes Family: Chionididae

The sheathbills are scavengers of the Antarctic regions. They have white plumage and look plump and dove-like but are believed to be similar to the ancestors of the modern gulls and terns.

- Snowy sheathbill, Chionis alba

== Magellanic plover ==
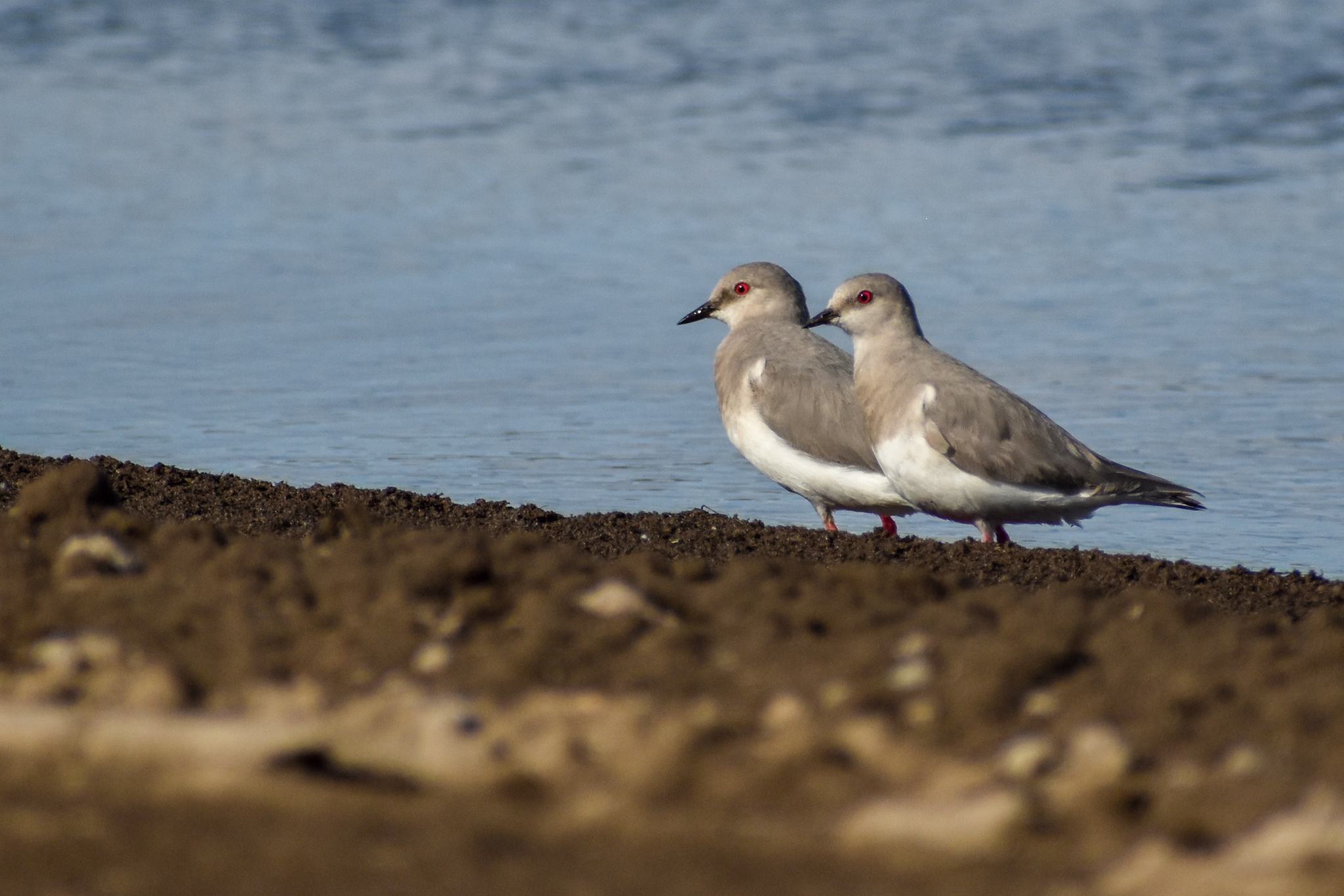
Magellanic plover

Order: Charadriiformes Family: Pluvianellidae

The Magellanic plover is a rare wader found only in southernmost South America. In its build and habits it is similar to a turnstone. Its upperparts and breast are pale gray, and the rest of the underparts are white. It has short red legs, a black bill and a red eye. In young birds, the eyes and legs are yellowish.

- Magellanic plover, Pluvianellus socialis

== Sandpipers ==
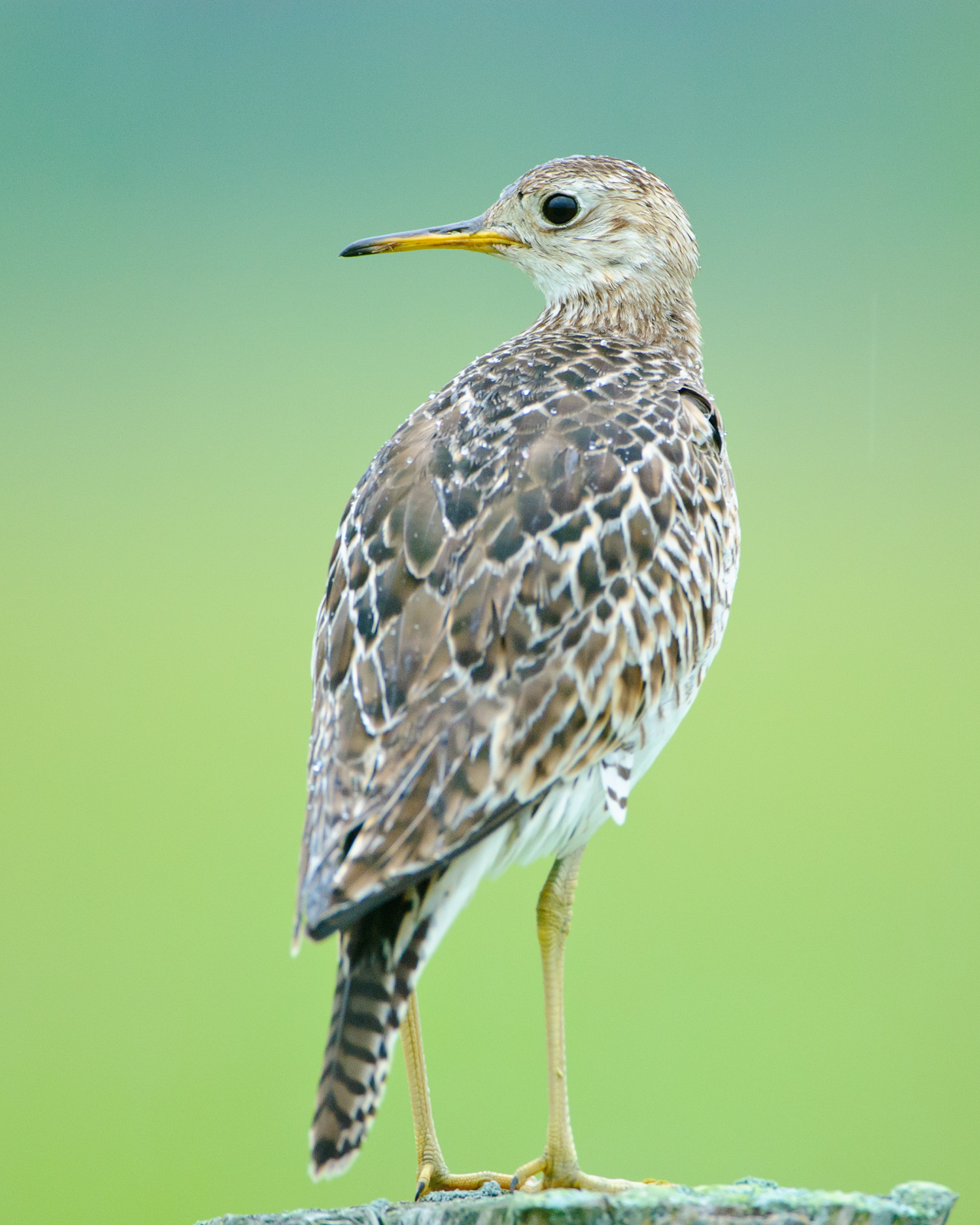
Upland sandpiper

Order: Charadriiformes Family: Scolopacidae

Scolopacidae is a large diverse family of small to medium-sized shorebirds including the sandpipers, curlews, godwits, shanks, tattlers, woodcocks, snipes, dowitchers, and phalaropes. The majority of these species eat small invertebrates picked out of the mud or soil. Variation in length of legs and bills enables multiple species to feed in the same habitat, particularly on the coast, without direct competition for food.

- Upland sandpiper, Bartramia longicauda
- Eskimo curlew, Numenius borealis (believed extinct)
- Whimbrel, Numenius phaeopus
- Eurasian curlew, Numenius arquata (V)
- Hudsonian godwit, Limosa haemastica
- Marbled godwit, Limosa fedoa (V)
- Ruddy turnstone, Arenaria interpres
- Red knot, Calidris canutus
- Surfbird, Calidris virgata
- Ruff, Calidris pugnax (V)
- Stilt sandpiper, Calidris himantopus
- Curlew sandpiper, Calidris ferruginea (V)
- Sanderling, Calidris alba
- Dunlin, Calidris alpina (U)
- Baird's sandpiper, Calidris bairdii
- Least sandpiper, Calidris minutilla (V)
- White-rumped sandpiper, Calidris fuscicollis
- Buff-breasted sandpiper, Calidris subruficollis
- Pectoral sandpiper, Calidris melanotos
- Semipalmated sandpiper, Calidris pusilla (V)
- Western sandpiper, Calidris mauri (U)
- Short-billed dowitcher, Limnodromus griseus (V)
- Long-billed dowitcher, Limnodromus scolopaceus (U)
- Fuegian snipe, Gallinago stricklandii
- Giant snipe, Gallinago undulata
- Pantanal snipe, Gallinago paraguaiae
- Magellanic snipe, Gallinago magellanica
- Puna snipe, Gallinago andina
- Wilson's phalarope, Phalaropus tricolor
- Red-necked phalarope, Phalaropus lobatus (V)
- Red phalarope, Phalaropus fulicarius
- Terek sandpiper, Xenus cinereus (V)
- Spotted sandpiper, Actitis macularius
- Solitary sandpiper, Tringa solitaria
- Wandering tattler, Tringa incana (U)
- Common greenshank, Tringa nebularia (U)
- Greater yellowlegs, Tringa melanoleuca
- Willet, Tringa semipalmata
- Lesser yellowlegs, Tringa flavipes

== Seedsnipes ==
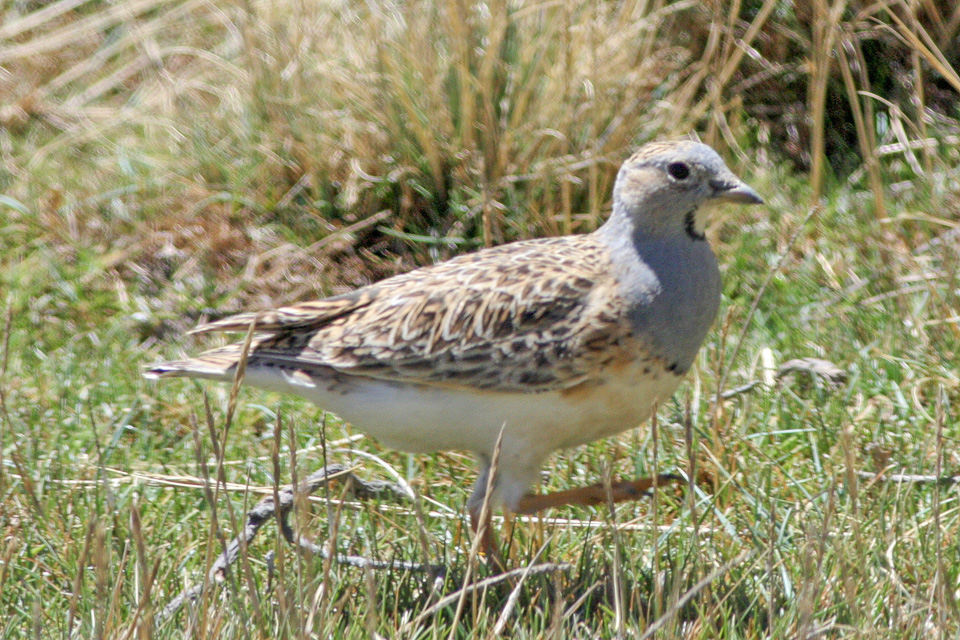
Grey-breasted seedsnipe

Order: Charadriiformes Family: Thinocoridae

The seedsnipes are a small family of birds that superficially resemble sparrows. They have short legs and long wings and are herbivorous waders.

- Rufous-bellied seedsnipe, Attagis gayi
- White-bellied seedsnipe, Attagis malouinus
- Gray-breasted seedsnipe, Thinocorus orbignyianus
- Least seedsnipe, Thinocorus rumicivorus

== Jacanas ==
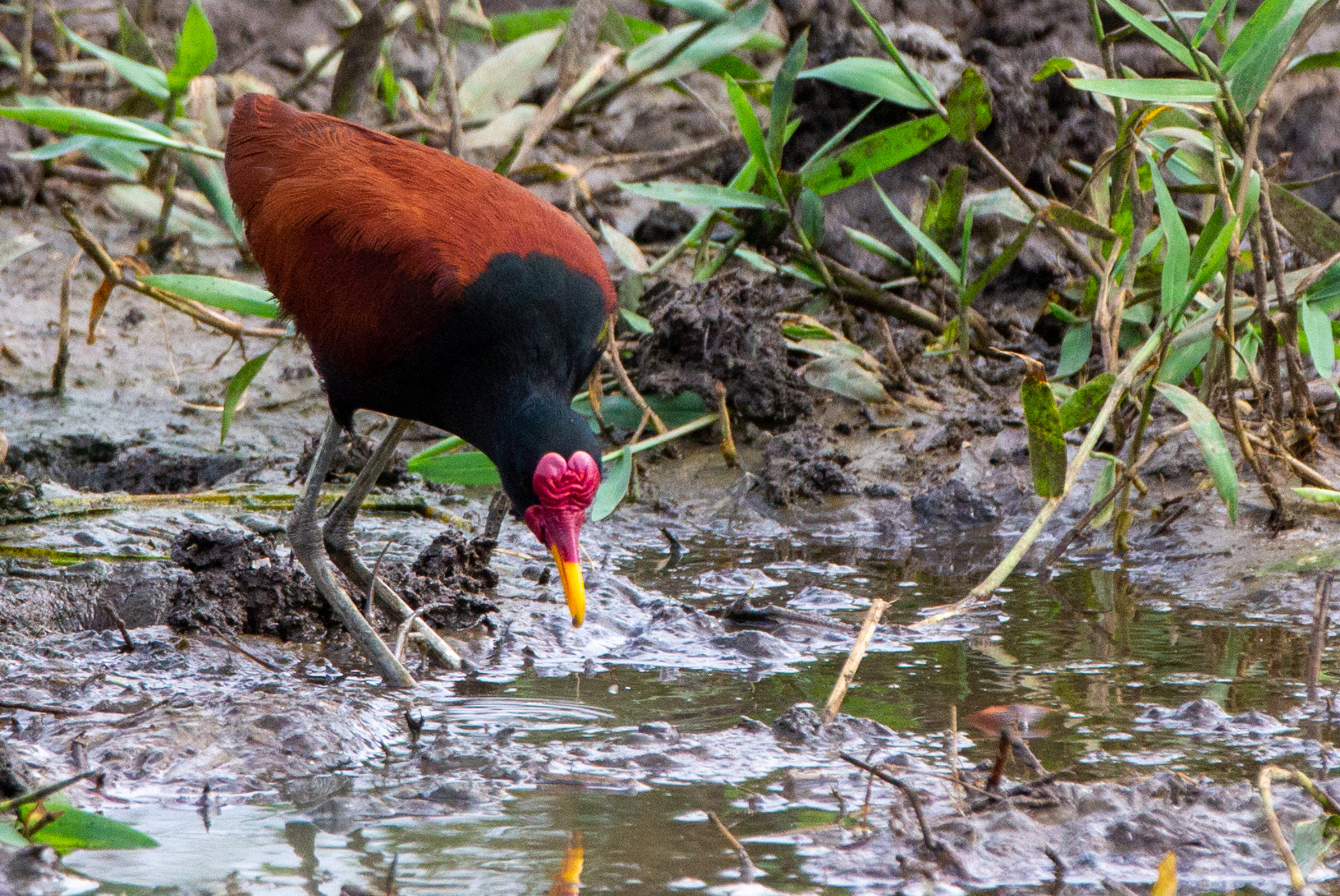
Wattled jacana

Order: Charadriiformes Family: Jacanidae

The jacanas are a family of waders found throughout the tropics. They are identifiable by their huge feet and claws which enable them to walk on floating vegetation in the shallow lakes that are their preferred habitat.

- Wattled jacana, Jacana jacana

== Painted-snipes ==
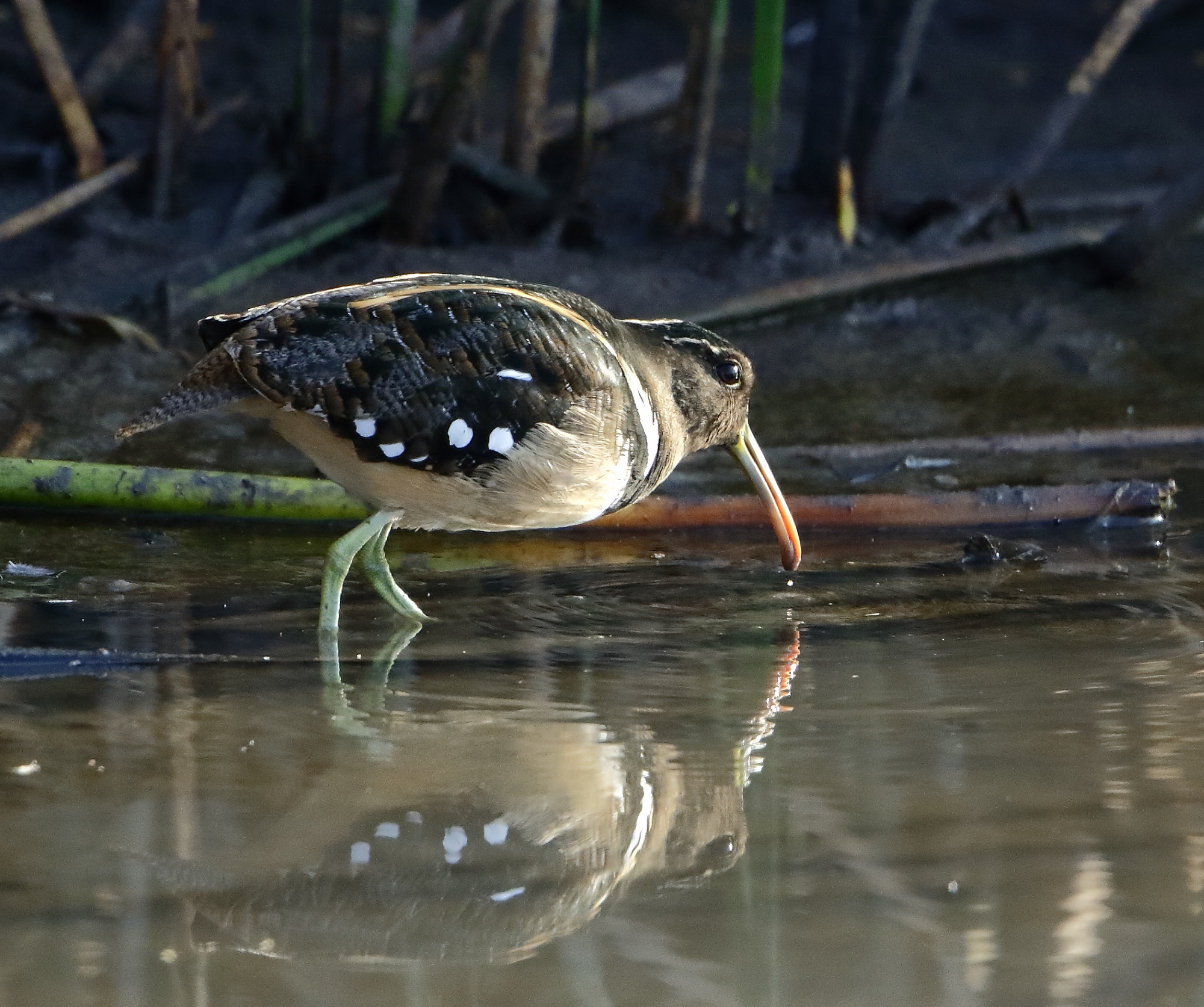
South American painted-snipe

Order: Charadriiformes Family: Rostratulidae

Painted-snipes are short-legged, long-billed birds similar in shape to the true snipes, but more brightly colored.

- South American painted-snipe, Rostratula semicollaris

== Skuas ==
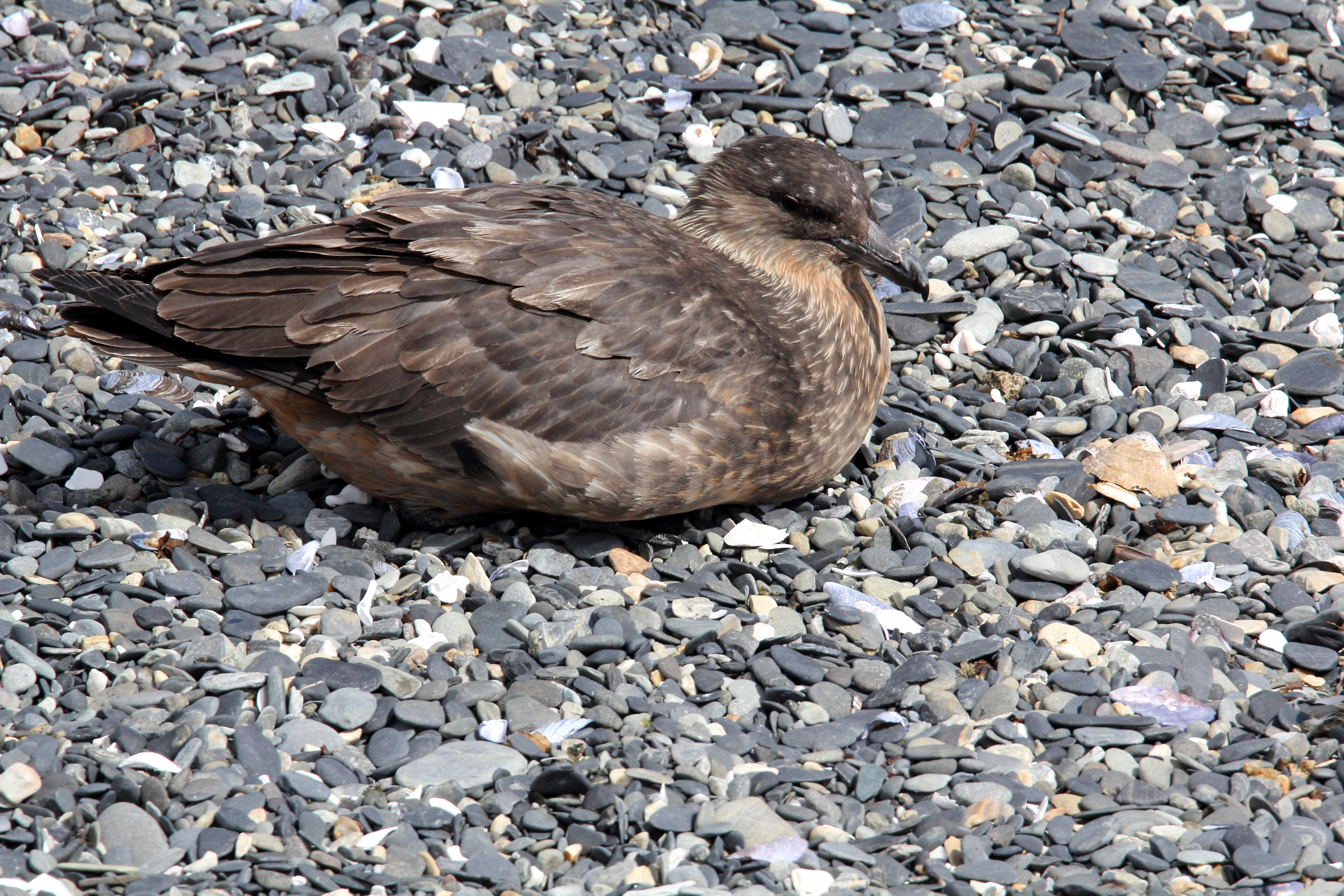
Chilean skua

Order: Charadriiformes Family: Stercorariidae

The family Stercorariidae are, in general, medium to large birds, typically with gray or brown plumage, often with white markings on the wings. They nest on the ground in temperate and arctic regions and are long-distance migrants.

- Chilean skua, Stercorarius chilensis
- South polar skua, Stercorarius maccormicki
- Brown skua, Stercorarius antarcticus
- Pomarine jaeger, Stercorarius pomarinus
- Parasitic jaeger, Stercorarius parasiticus
- Long-tailed jaeger, Stercorarius longicaudus

== Gulls ==
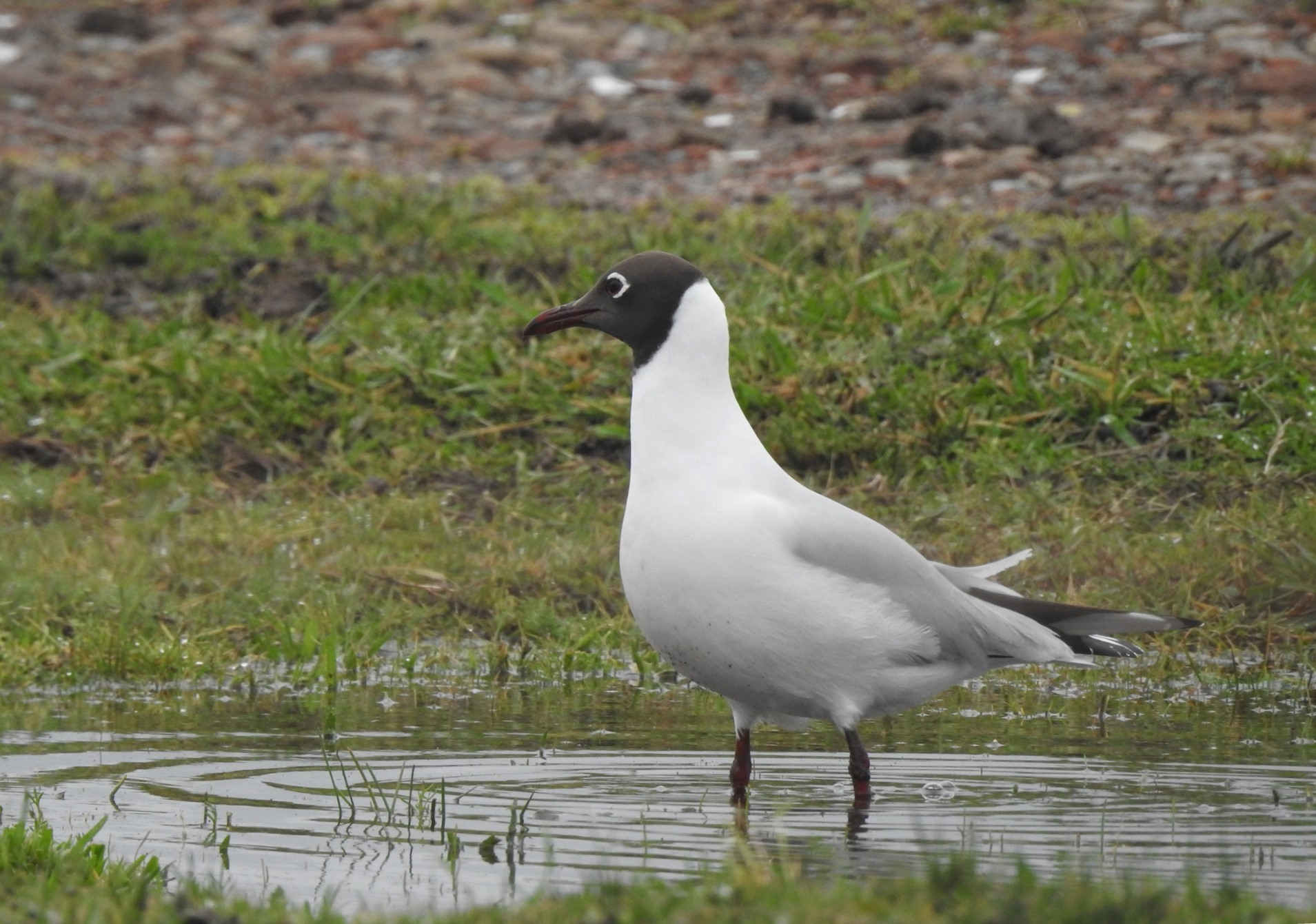
Brown-hooded gull

Order: Charadriiformes Family: Laridae

Laridae is a family of medium to large seabirds and includes gulls, terns and skimmers. Gulls are typically gray or white, often with black markings on the head or wings. They have longish bills and webbed feet. Terns are a group of generally medium to large seabirds typically with gray or white plumage, often with black markings on the head. Most terns hunt fish by diving but some pick insects off the surface of fresh water. Terns are generally long-lived birds, with several species known to live in excess of 30 years.

- Black skimmer, Rynchops niger
- Sabine's gull, Xema sabini (V)
- Andean gull, Chroicocephalus serranus
- Brown-hooded gull, Chroicocephalus maculipennis
- Gray-hooded gull, Chroicocephalus cirrocephalus
- Dolphin gull, Leucophaeus scoresbii
- Gray gull, Leucophaeus modestus (V)
- Laughing gull, Leucophaeus atricilla (V)
- Franklin's gull, Leucophaeus pipixcan
- Common gull, Larus canus (UC)(V)
- Belcher's gull, Larus belcheri (U)
- Olrog's gull, Larus atlanticus
- Kelp gull, Larus dominicanus
- Lesser black-backed gull, Larus fuscus (V)
- Least tern, Sternula antillarum (V)
- Yellow-billed tern, Sternula superciliaris
- Large-billed tern, Phaetusa simplex
- Gull-billed tern, Gelochelidon nilotica
- Black tern, Chlidonias niger (V)
- White-winged tern, Chlidonias leucopterus (V)
- Common tern, Sterna hirundo
- Roseate tern, Sterna dougallii (U)
- Arctic tern, Sterna paradisaea
- South American tern, Sterna hirundinacea
- Antarctic tern, Sterna vittata (V)
- Snowy-crowned tern, Sterna trudeaui
- Sandwich tern, Thalasseus sandvicensis
- Royal tern, Thalasseus maximus

== Penguins ==
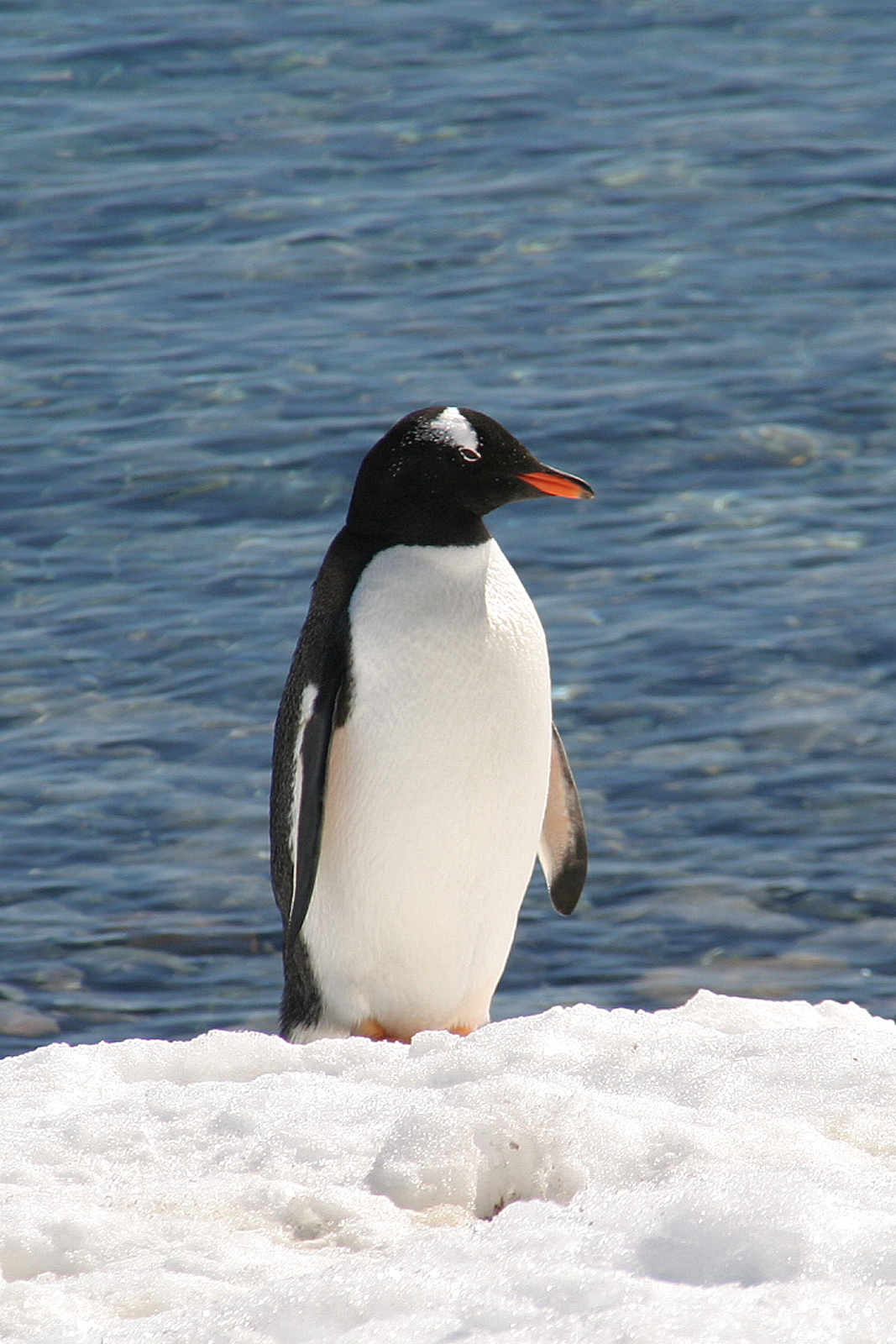
Gentoo penguin

Order: Sphenisciformes Family: Spheniscidae

The penguins are a group of aquatic, flightless birds living almost exclusively in the Southern Hemisphere. Most penguins feed on krill, fish, squid and other forms of sealife caught while swimming underwater.

- King penguin, Aptenodytes patagonicus
- Emperor penguin, Aptenodytes forsteri (V)
- Gentoo penguin, Pygoscelis papua
- Adelie penguin, Pygoscelis adeliae (V)
- Chinstrap penguin, Pygoscelis antarcticus (V)
- Humboldt penguin, Spheniscus humboldti (U)
- Magellanic penguin, Spheniscus magellanicus
- Erect-crested penguin, Eudyptes sclateri (V)
- Macaroni penguin, Eudyptes chrysolophus (V)
- Tristan penguin, Eudyptes moseleyi (V)
- Rockhopper penguin, Eudyptes chrysocome
- Snares penguin, Eudyptes robustus (V)

== Albatrosses ==
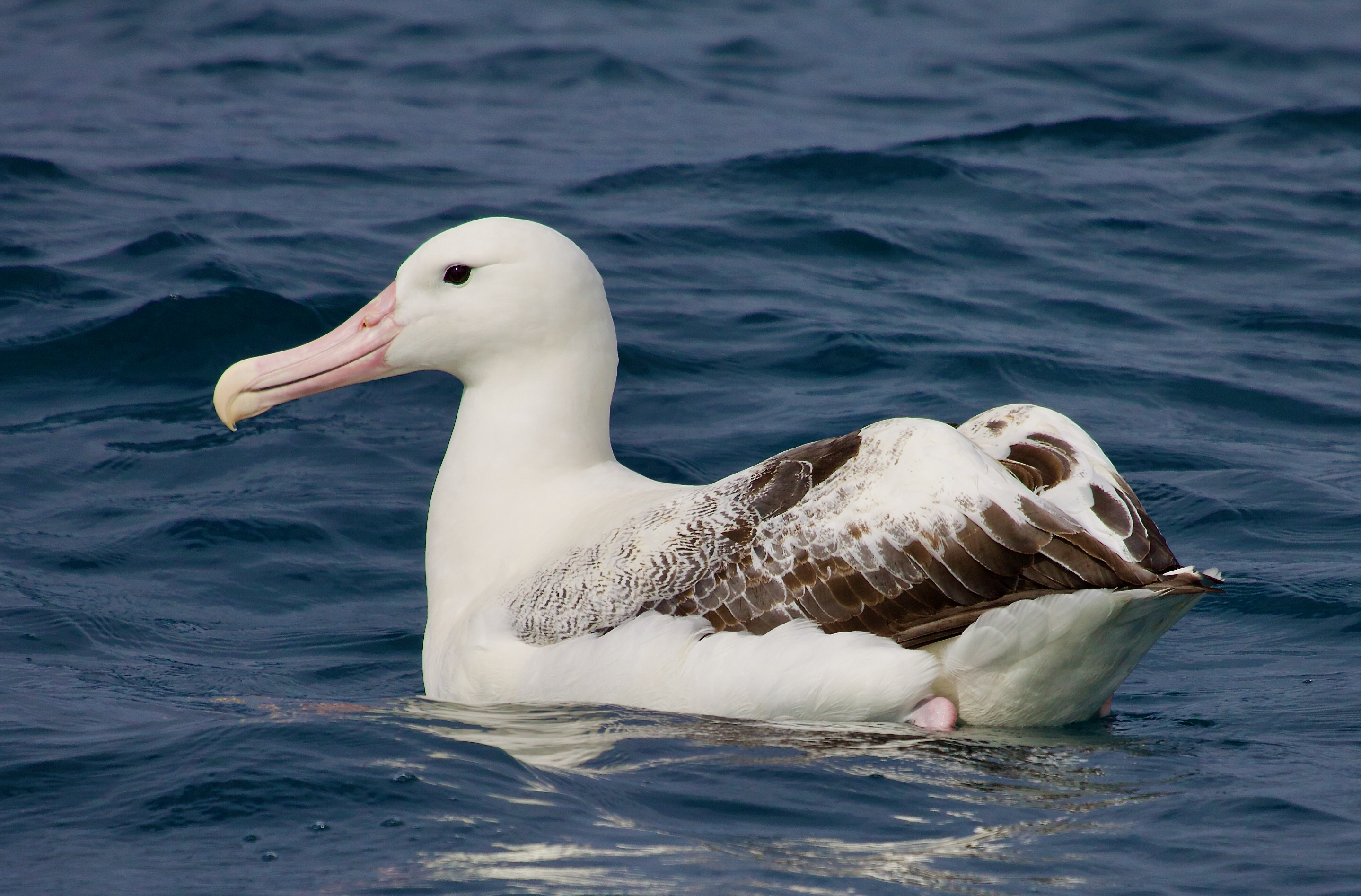
Southern royal albatross

Order: Procellariiformes Family: Diomedeidae

The albatrosses are among the largest of flying birds, and the great albatrosses from the genus Diomedea have the largest wingspans of any extant birds.

- Royal albatross, Diomedea epomophora
- Wandering albatross, Diomedea exulans
- Sooty albatross, Phoebetria fusca (V)
- Light-mantled albatross, Phoebetria palpebrata
- Yellow-nosed albatross, Thalassarche chlororhynchos
- Black-browed albatross, Thalassarche melanophris
- Gray-headed albatross, Thalassarche chrysostoma
- Buller's albatross, Thalassarche bulleri (V)
- White-capped albatross, Thalassarche cauta
- Salvin's albatross, Thalassarche salvini (V)

== Southern storm-petrels ==
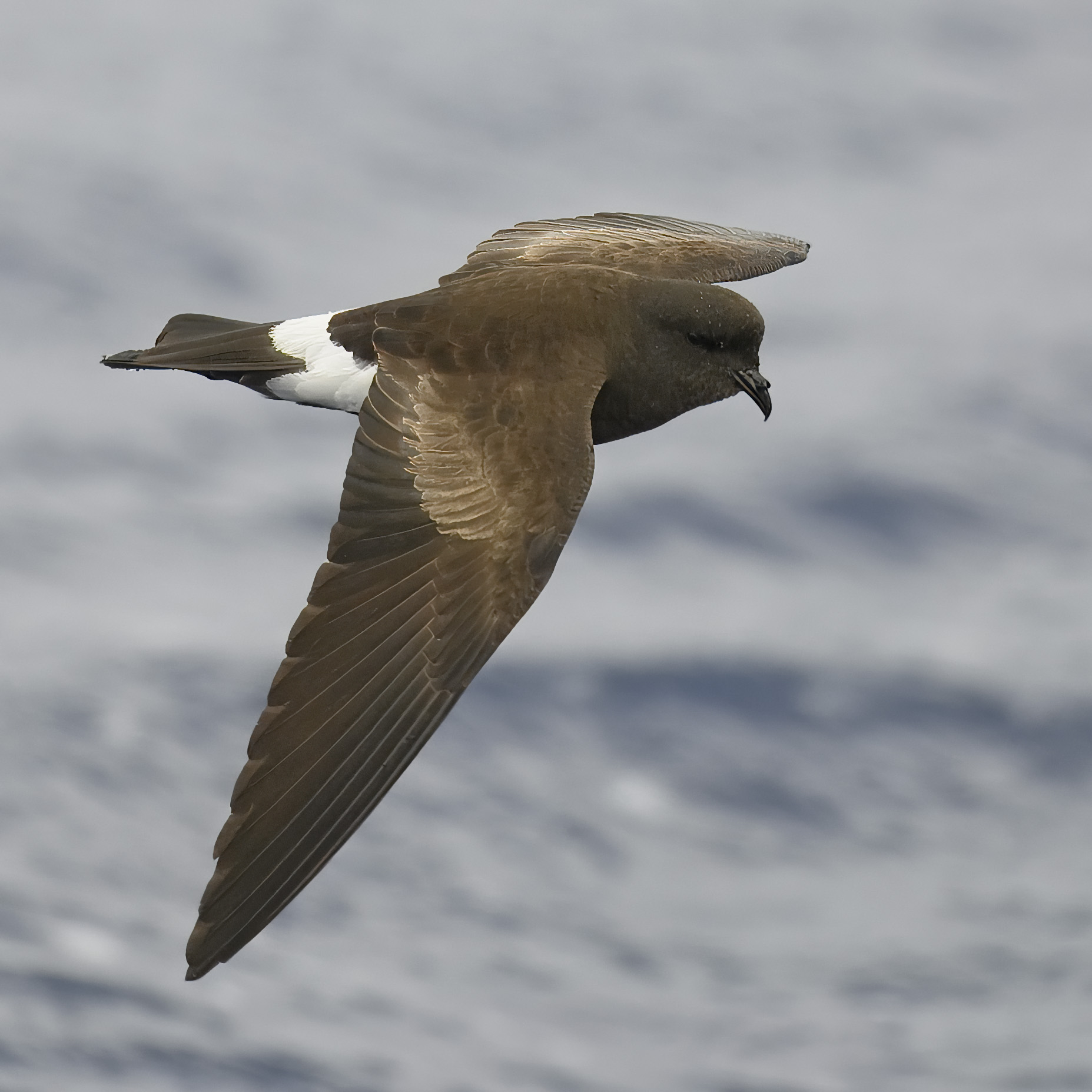
Wilson's storm petrel

Order: Procellariiformes Family: Oceanitidae

The storm-petrels are relatives of the petrels and are the smallest seabirds. They feed on planktonic crustaceans and small fish picked from the surface, typically while hovering. The flight is fluttering and sometimes bat-like.

- White-bellied storm-petrel, Fregetta grallaria (U)
- Black-bellied storm-petrel, Fregetta tropica (U)
- Wilson's storm-petrel, Oceanites oceanicus
- Pincoya storm-petrel, Oceanites pincoyae
- Gray-backed storm-petrel, Garrodia nereis
- White-faced storm-petrel, Pelagodroma marina (V)

== Northern storm-petrels ==
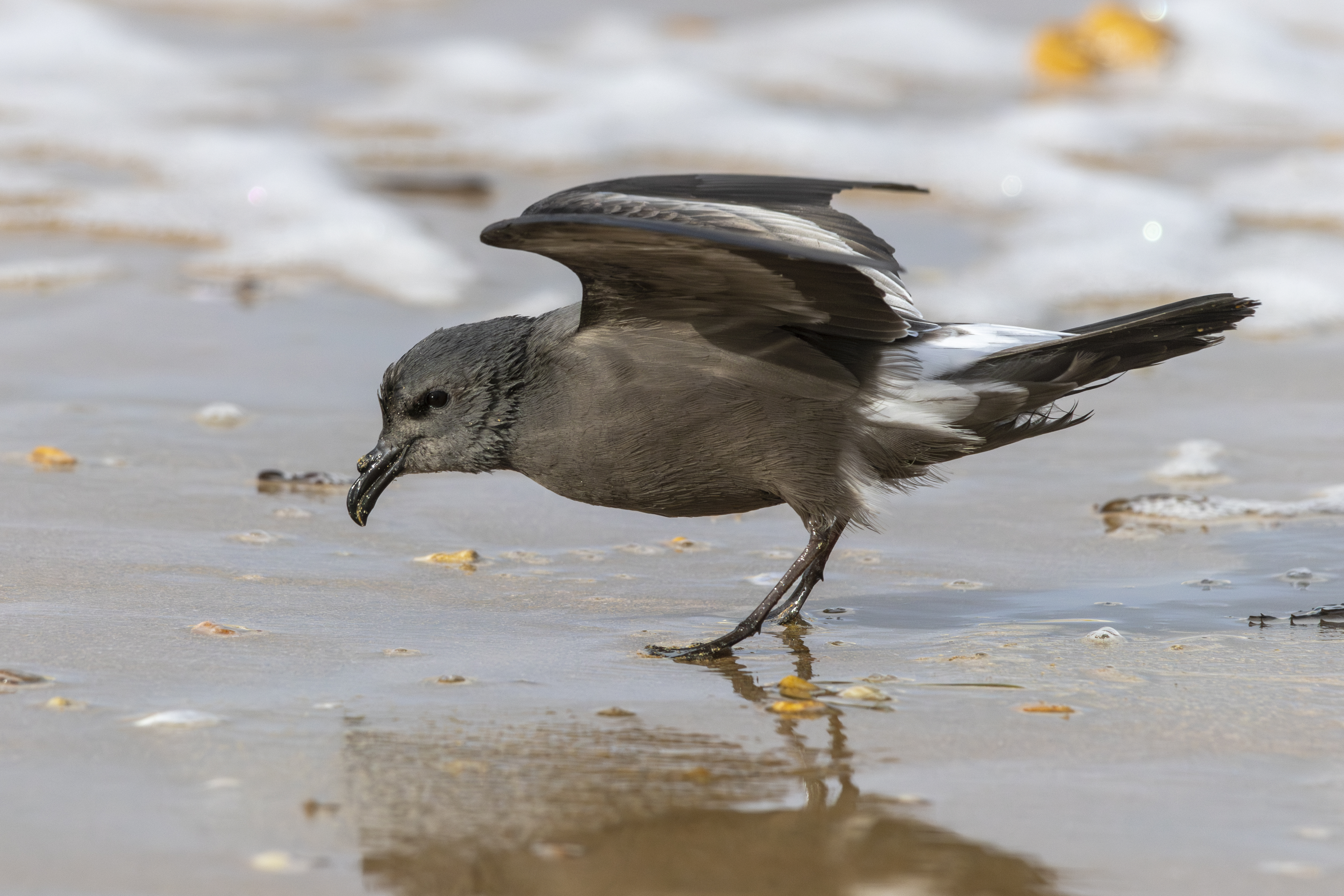
Leach's storm petrel

Order: Procellariiformes Family: Hydrobatidae

Though the members of this family are similar in many respects to the southern storm-petrels, including their general appearance and habits, there are enough genetic differences to warrant their placement in a separate family.

- Leach's storm-petrel, Hydrobates leucorhous (U)
- Hornby's storm-petrel, Hydrobates hornbyi (V)

== Shearwaters ==
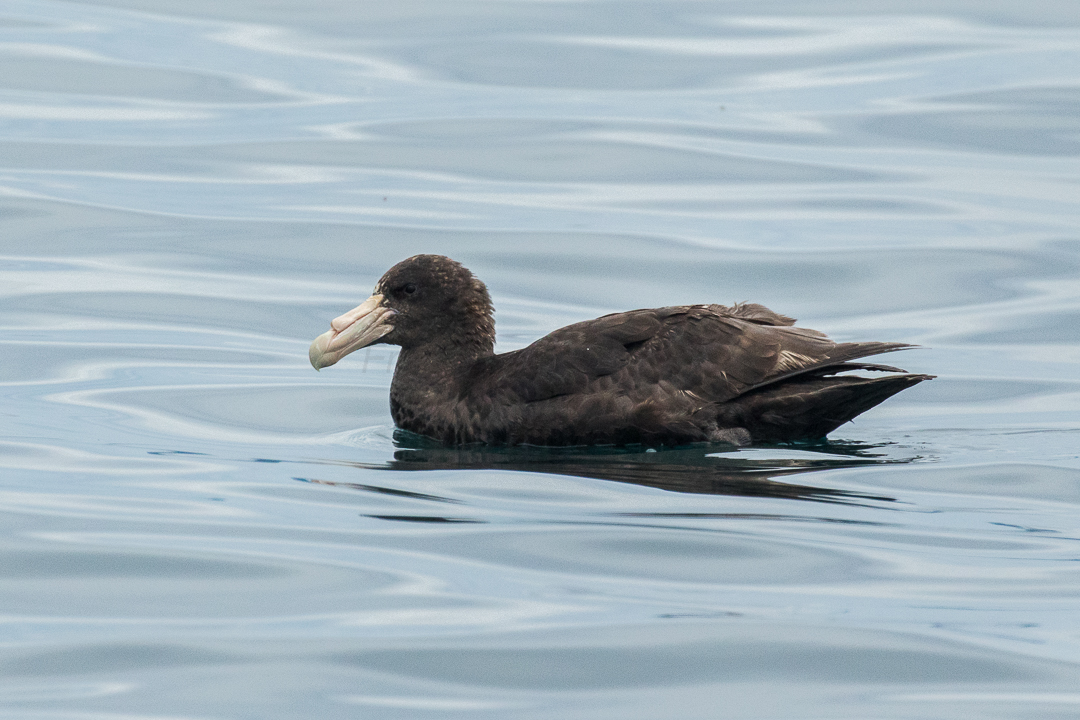
Southern giant petrel

Order: Procellariiformes Family: Procellariidae

The procellariids are the main group of medium-sized "true petrels", characterized by united nostrils with medium septum and a long outer functional primary.

- Southern giant-petrel, Macronectes giganteus
- Northern giant-petrel, Macronectes halli
- Southern fulmar, Fulmarus glacialoides
- Pintado petrel, Daption capense
- Kerguelen petrel, Aphrodroma brevirostris
- Soft-plumaged petrel, Pterodroma mollis
- Atlantic petrel, Pterodroma incerta
- White-headed petrel, Pterodroma lessonii (U)
- Trindade petrel, Pterodroma arminjoniana (U)
- Blue petrel, Halobaena caerulea
- Fairy prion, Pachyptila turtur (U)
- Antarctic prion, Pachyptila desolata
- Slender-billed prion, Pachyptila belcheri
- Gray petrel, Procellaria cinerea (V)
- White-chinned petrel, Procellaria aequinoctialis
- Spectacled petrel, Procellaria conspicillata
- Parkinson's petrel, Procellaria parkinsoni (U)
- Westland petrel, Procellaria westlandica (V)
- Cory's shearwater, Calonectris diomedea
- Cape Verde shearwater, Calonectris edwardsii
- Sooty shearwater, Ardenna grisea
- Great shearwater, Ardenna gravis
- Pink-footed shearwater, Ardenna creatopus (V)
- Manx shearwater, Puffinus puffinus
- Little shearwater, Puffinus assimilis
- Common diving-petrel, Pelecanoides urinatrix
- South Georgia diving-petrel, Pelecanoides georgicus (U)
- Magellanic diving-petrel, Pelecanoides magellani

== Storks ==
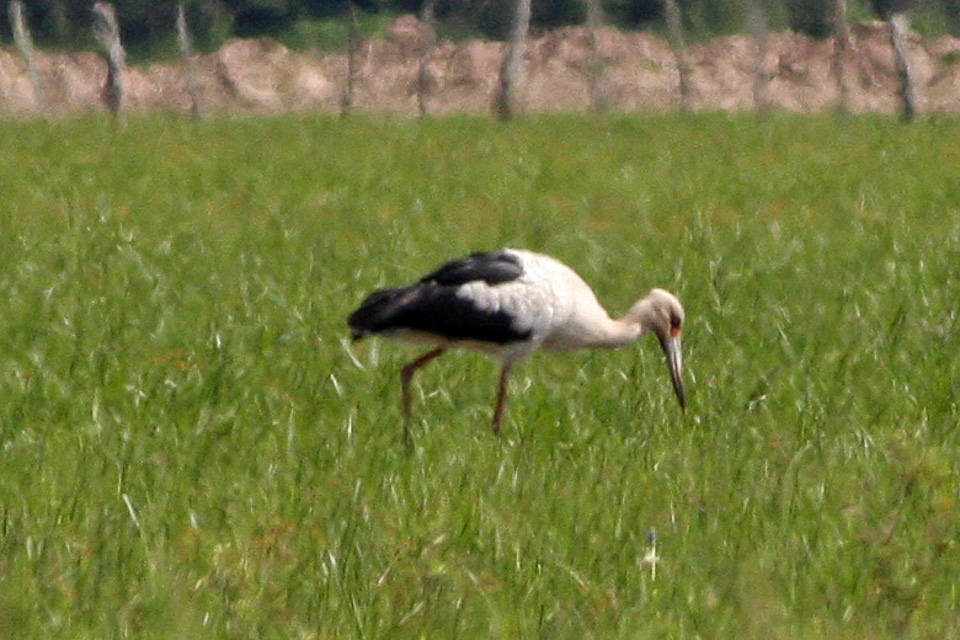
Maguari stork

Order: Ciconiiformes Family: Ciconiidae

Storks are large, long-legged, long-necked, wading birds with long, stout bills. Storks are mute, but bill-clattering is an important mode of communication at the nest. Their nests can be large and may be reused for many years. Many species are migratory.

- White stork, Ciconia ciconia (UC)(V)
- Maguari stork, Ciconia maguari
- Jabiru, Jabiru mycteria
- Wood stork, Mycteria americana

== Frigatebirds ==
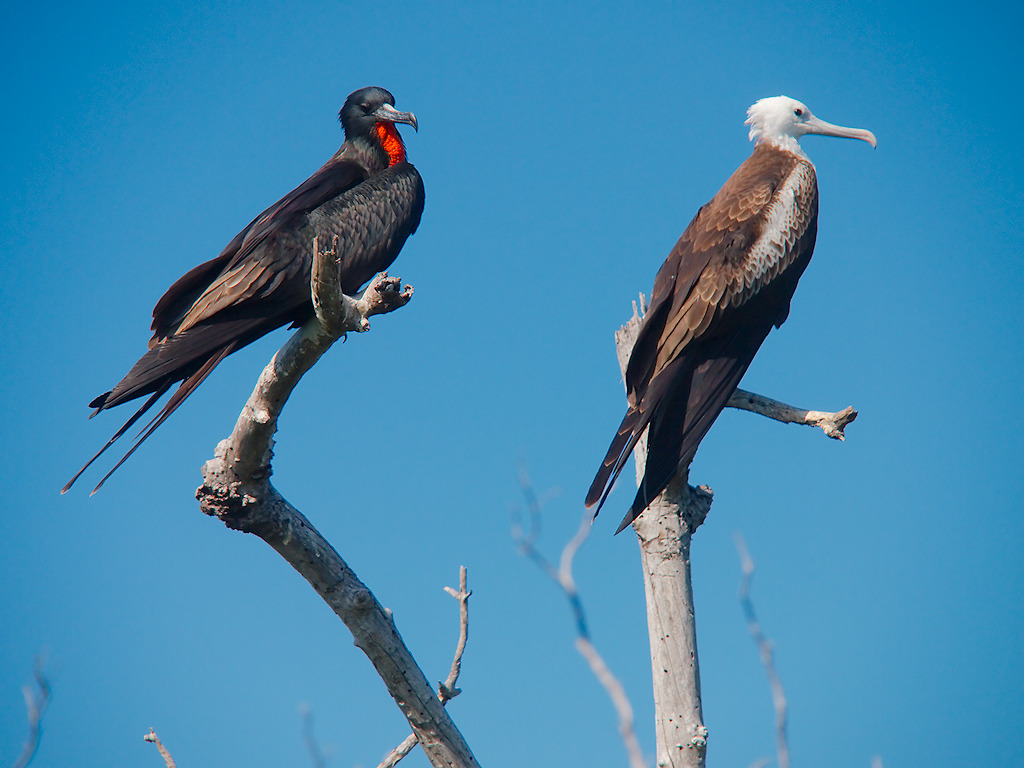
Magnificent frigatebird

Order: Suliformes Family: Fregatidae

Frigatebirds are large seabirds usually found over tropical oceans. They are large, black-and-white or completely black, with long wings and deeply forked tails. The males have colored inflatable throat pouches. They do not swim or walk and cannot take off from a flat surface. Having the largest wingspan-to-body-weight ratio of any bird, they are essentially aerial, able to stay aloft for more than a week.

- Magnificent frigatebird, Fregata magnificens

== Boobies ==
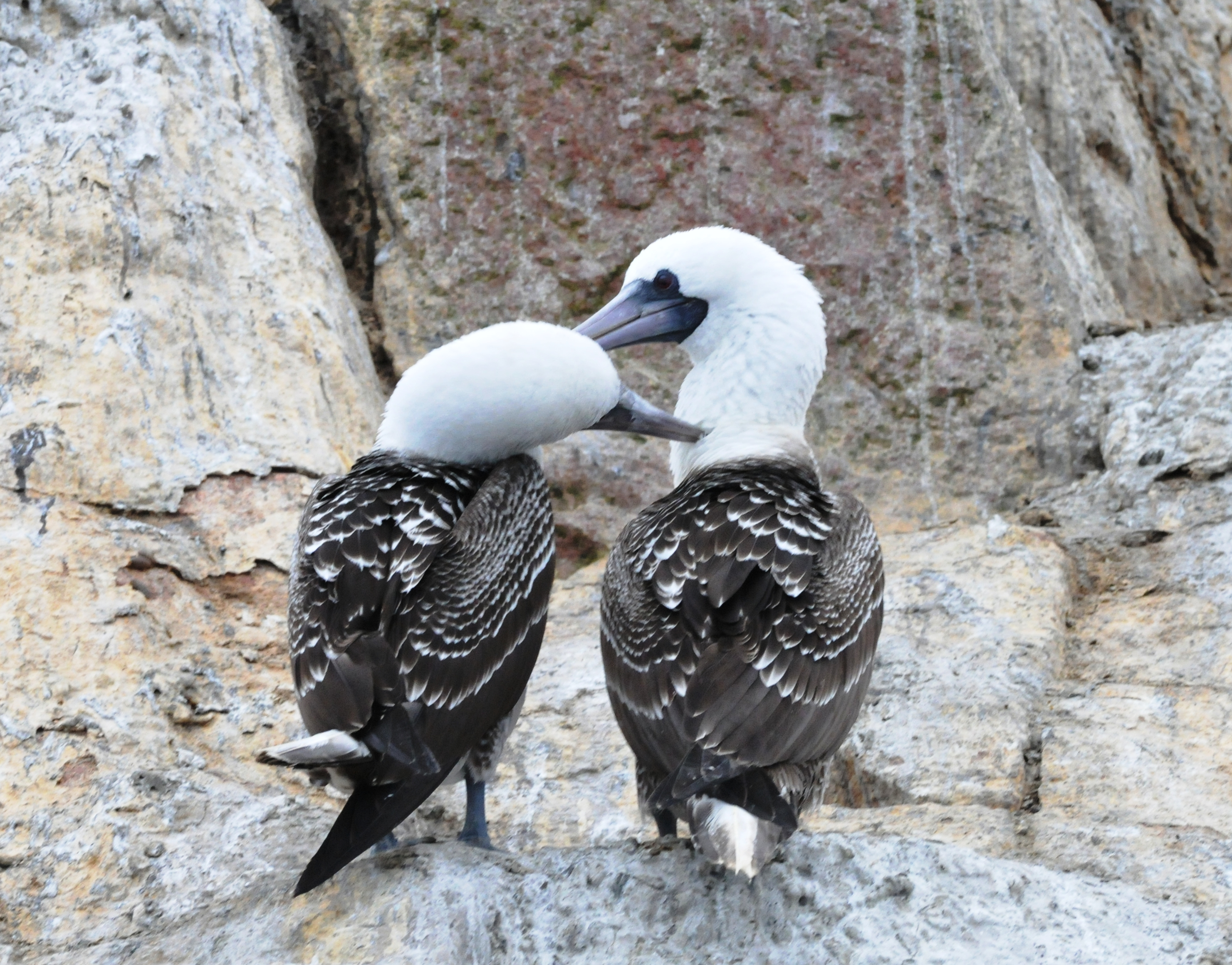
Peruvian booby

Order: Suliformes Family: Sulidae

The sulids comprise the gannets and boobies. Both groups are medium to large coastal seabirds that plunge-dive for fish.

- Cape gannet, Morus capensis (V)
- Peruvian booby, Sula variegata (U)
- Brown booby, Sula leucogaster (V)

== Anhingas ==
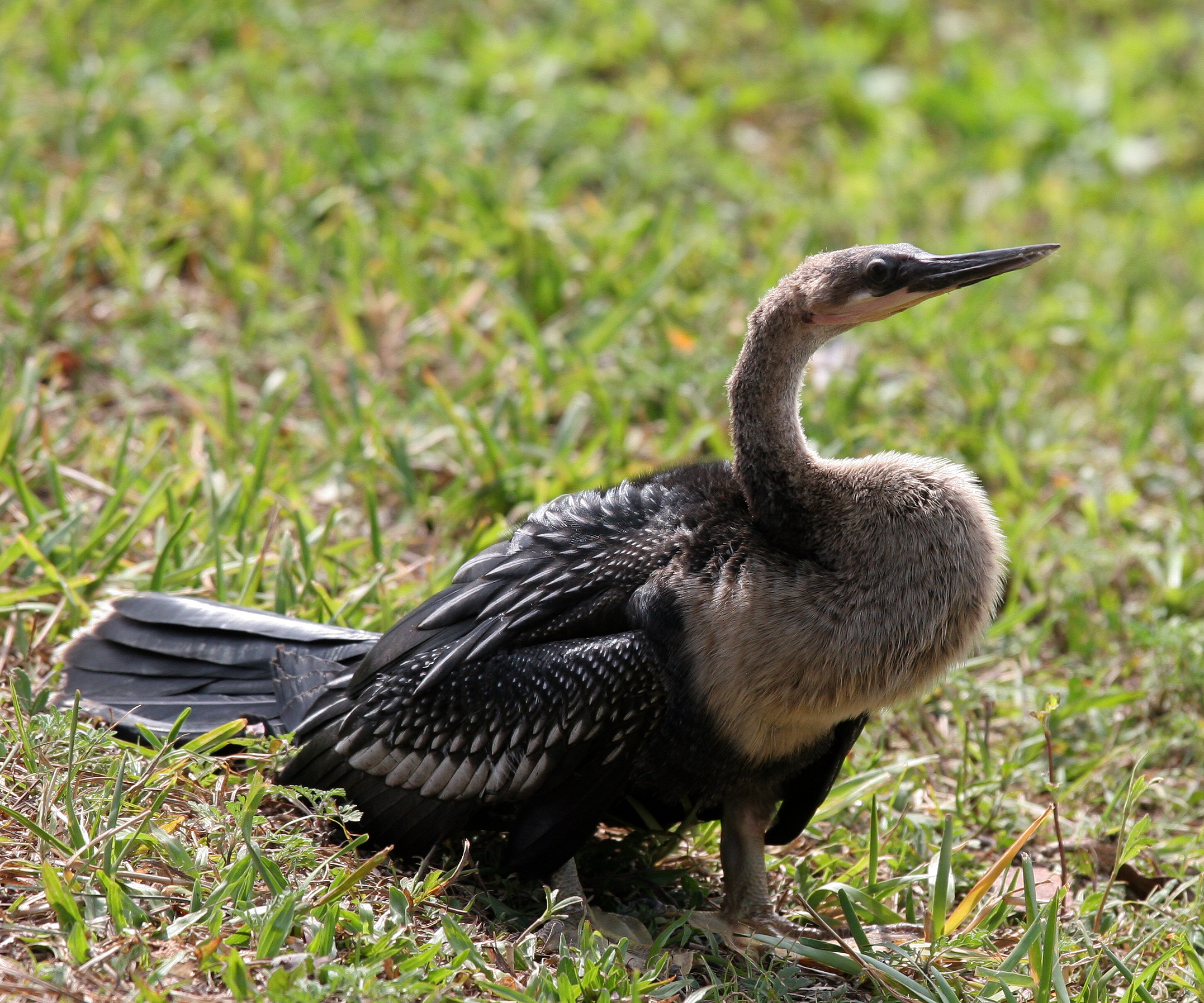
Anhinga

Order: Suliformes Family: Anhingidae

Anhingas are often called "snake-birds" because of their long thin neck, which gives a snake-like appearance when they swim with their bodies submerged. The males have black and dark-brown plumage, an erectile crest on the nape and a larger bill than the female. The females have much paler plumage especially on the neck and underparts. The darters have completely webbed feet and their legs are short and set far back on the body. Their plumage is somewhat permeable, like that of cormorants, and they spread their wings to dry after diving.

- Anhinga, Anhinga anhinga

== Cormorants ==
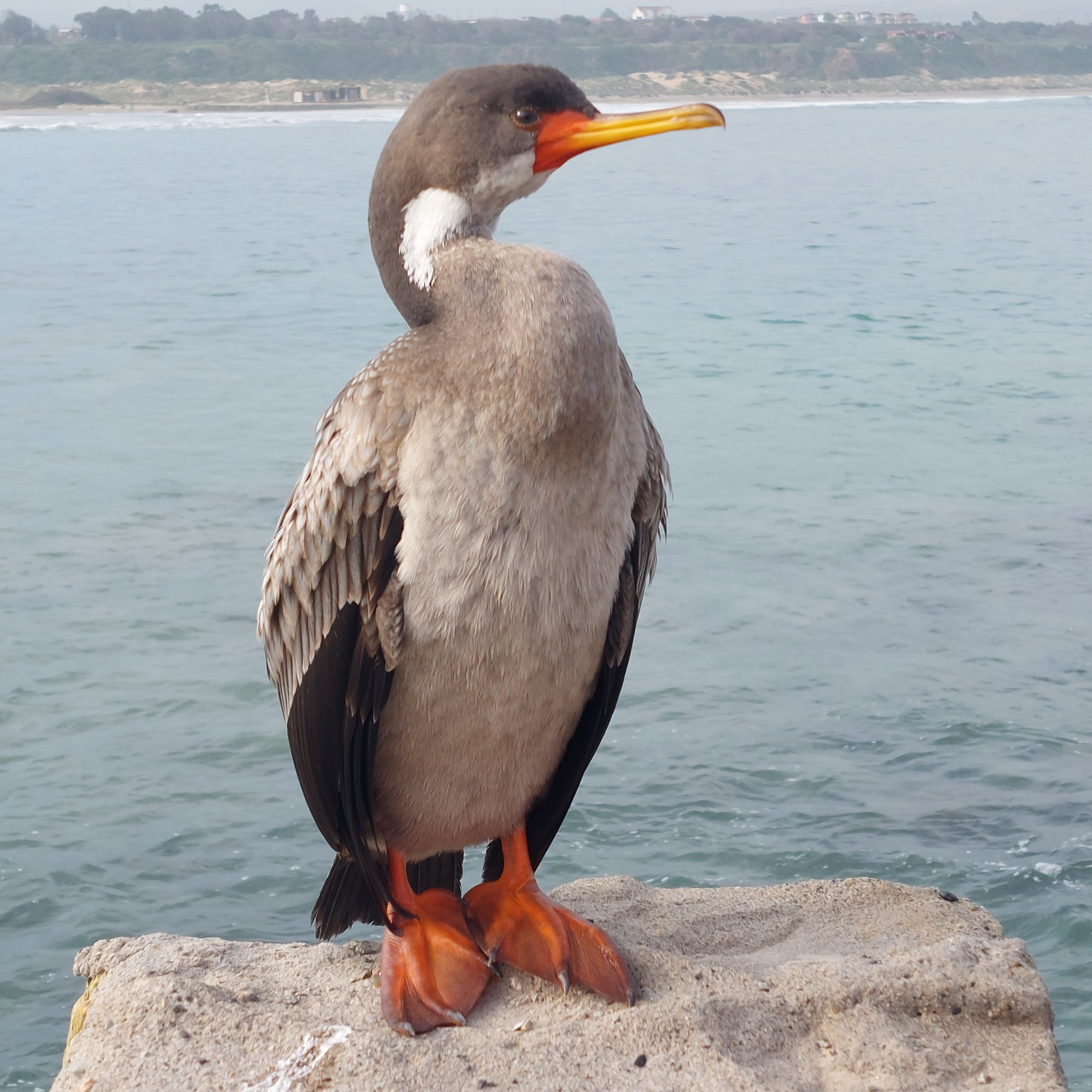
Red-legged cormorant

Order: Suliformes Family: Phalacrocoracidae

Phalacrocoracidae is a family of medium to large coastal, fish-eating seabirds that includes cormorants and shags. Plumage coloration varies, with the majority having mainly dark plumage, some species being black-and-white, and a few being colorful.

- Red-legged cormorant, Phalacrocorax gaimardi
- Neotropic cormorant, Phalacrocorax brasilianus
- Magellanic cormorant, Phalacrocorax magellanicus
- Guanay cormorant, Phalacrocorax bougainvillii (possibly extirpated)
- Imperial cormorant, Phalacrocorax atriceps

== Pelicans ==
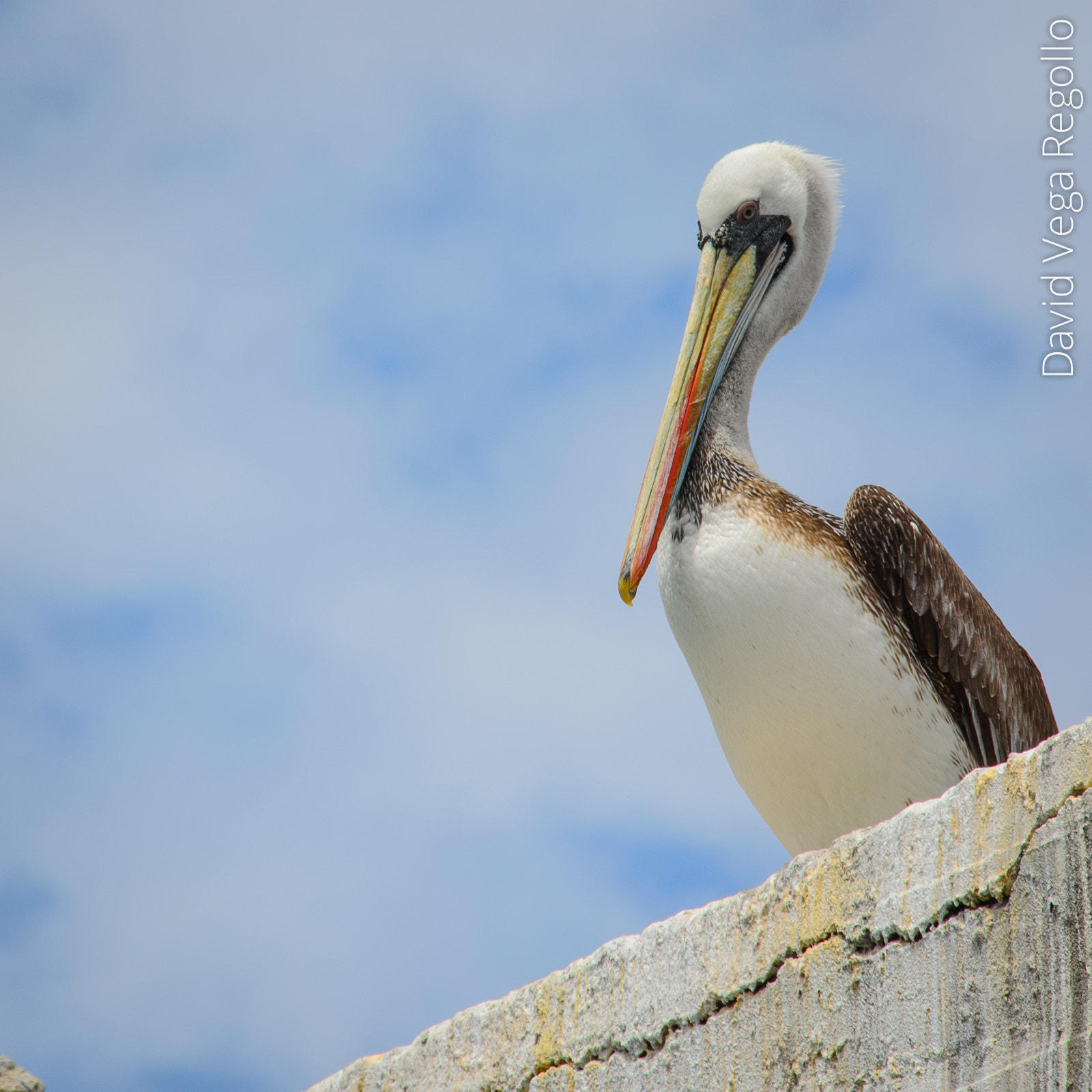
Peruvian pelican

Order: Pelecaniformes Family: Pelecanidae

Pelicans are large water birds with a distinctive pouch under their beak. As with other members of the order Pelecaniformes, they have webbed feet with four toes.

- Peruvian pelican, Pelecanus thagus (V)

== Herons ==
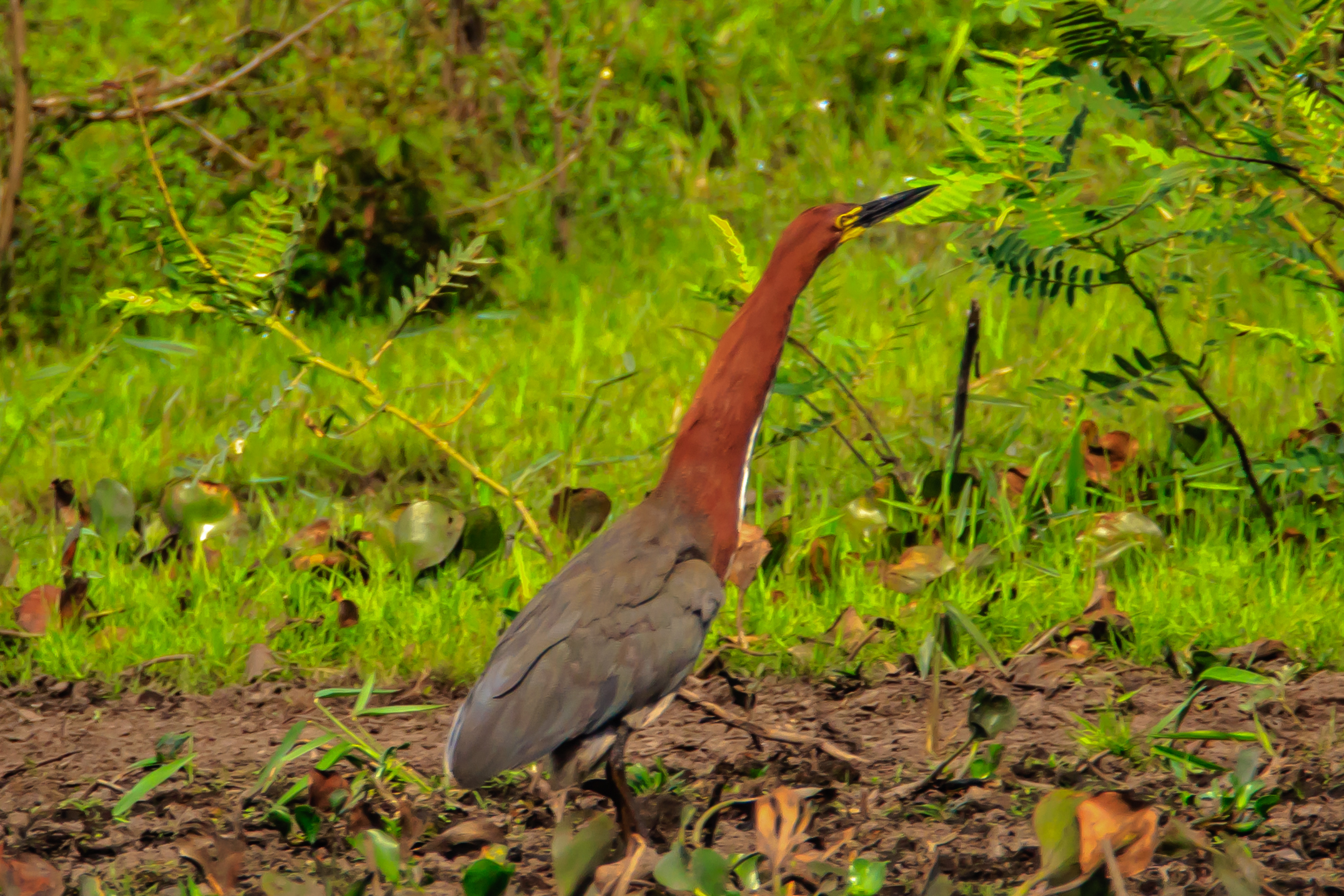
Rufescent tiger heron

Order: Pelecaniformes Family: Ardeidae

The family Ardeidae contains the bitterns, herons and egrets. Herons and egrets are medium to large wading birds with long necks and legs. Bitterns tend to be shorter necked and more wary. Members of Ardeidae fly with their necks retracted, unlike other long-necked birds such as storks, ibises and spoonbills.

- Rufescent tiger-heron, Tigrisoma lineatum
- Fasciated tiger-heron, Tigrisoma fasciatum
- Boat-billed heron, Cochlearius cochlearius
- Stripe-backed bittern, Ixobrychus involucris
- Least bittern, Ixobrychus exilis
- Pinnated bittern, Botaurus pinnatus
- Capped heron, Pilherodius pileatus
- Whistling heron, Syrigma sibilatrix
- Little blue heron, Egretta caerulea
- Snowy egret, Egretta thula
- Yellow-crowned night-heron, Nyctanassa violacea (V)
- Black-crowned night-heron, Nycticorax nycticorax
- Striated heron, Butorides striata
- Green heron, Butorides virescens (U)
- Cattle egret, Ardea ibis
- Great egret, Ardea alba
- Cocoi heron, Ardea cocoi

== Ibises ==
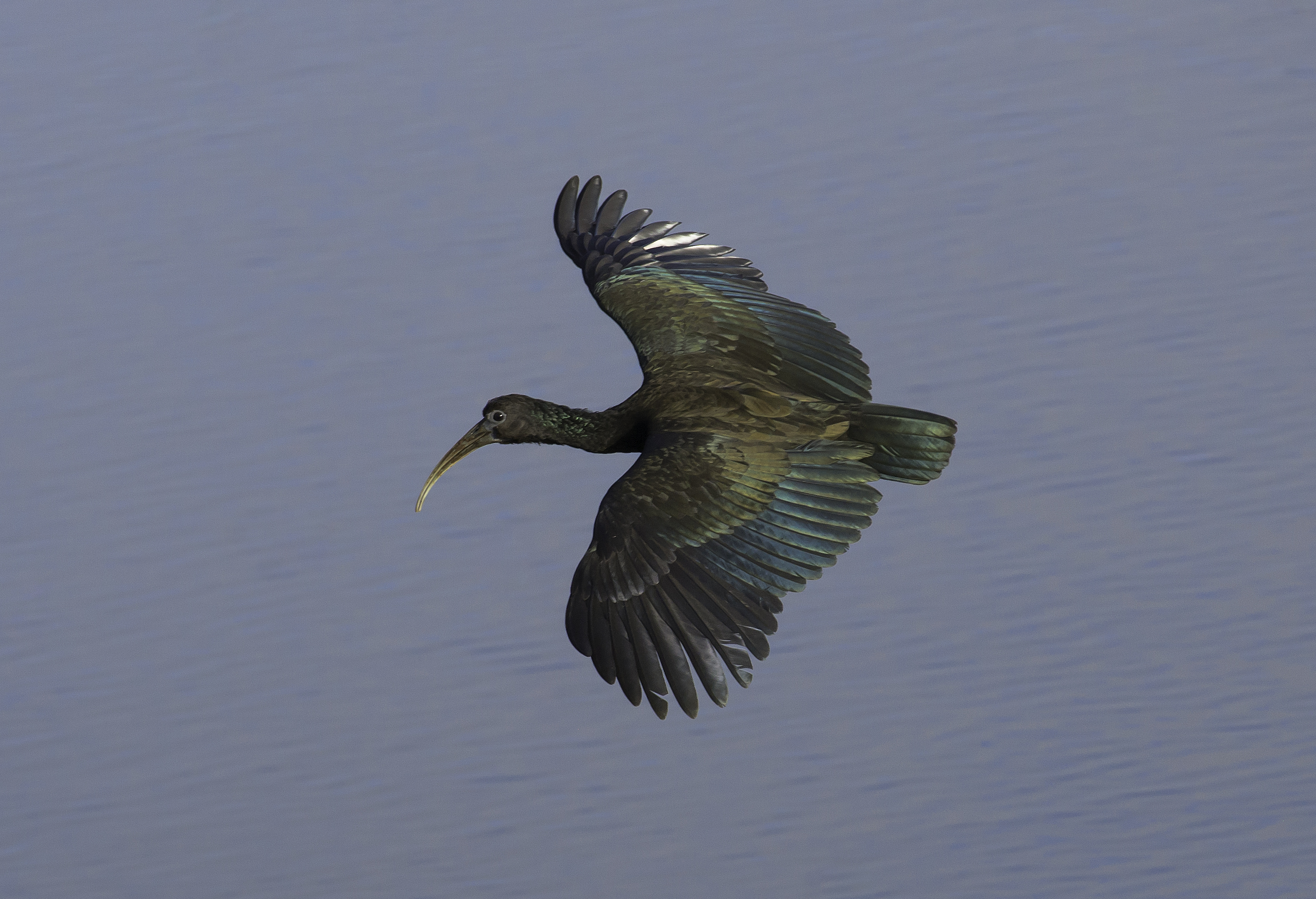
Green ibis

Order: Pelecaniformes Family: Threskiornithidae

Threskiornithidae is a family of large terrestrial and wading birds which includes the ibises and spoonbills. They have long, broad wings with 11 primary and about 20 secondary feathers. They are strong fliers and despite their size and weight, very capable soarers.

- Scarlet ibis, Eudocimus ruber (U)
- White-faced ibis, Plegadis chihi
- Puna ibis, Plegadis ridgwayi
- Green ibis, Mesembrinibis cayennensis
- Bare-faced ibis, Phimosus infuscatus
- Plumbeous ibis, Theristicus caerulescens
- Buff-necked ibis, Theristicus caudatus
- Andean ibis, Theristicus branickii (V)
- Black-faced ibis, Theristicus melanopis
- Roseate spoonbill, Platalea ajaja

== New World vultures ==
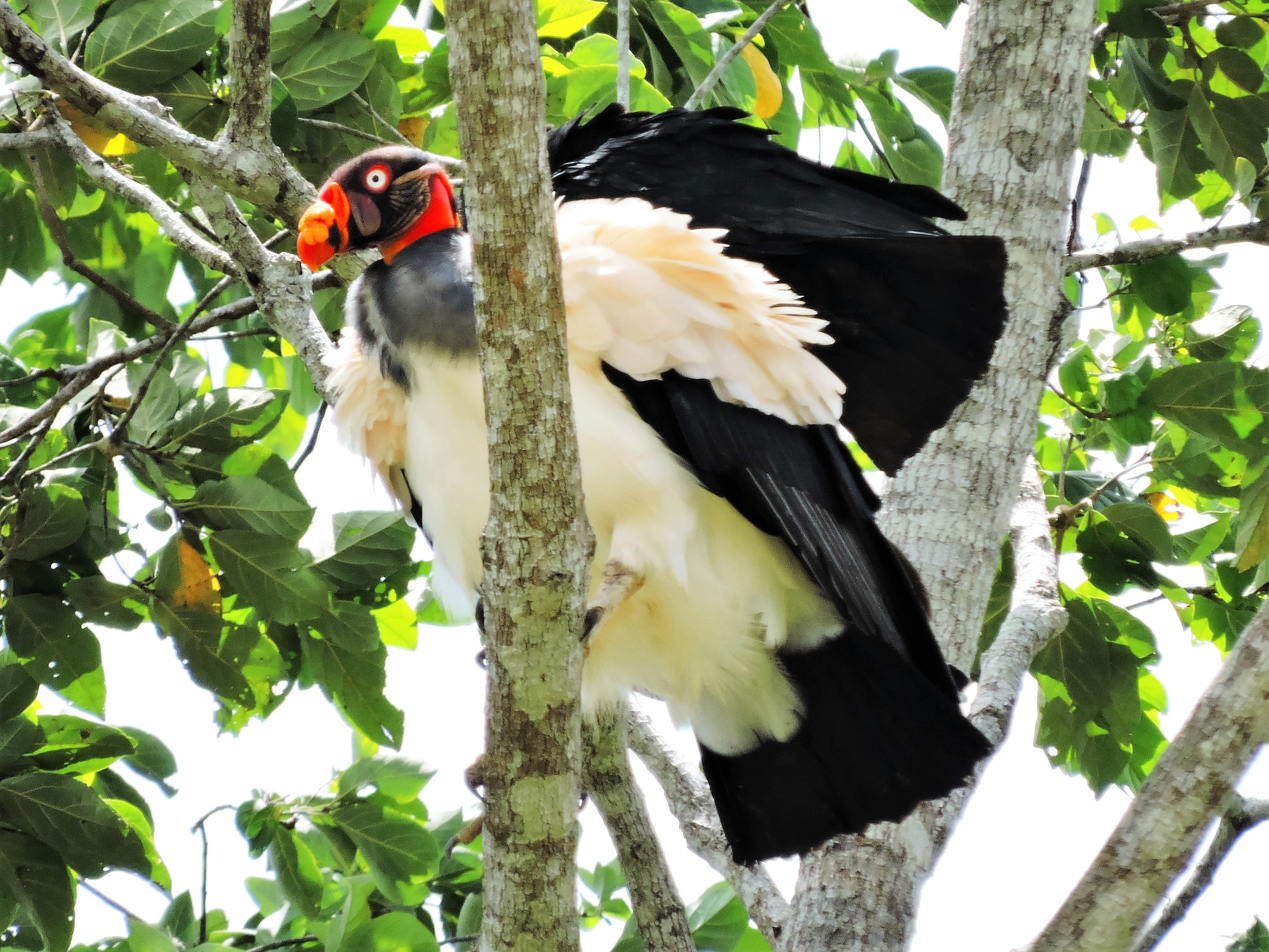
King vulture

Order: Cathartiformes Family: Cathartidae

The New World vultures are not closely related to Old World vultures, but superficially resemble them because of convergent evolution. Like the Old World vultures, they are scavengers. However, unlike Old World vultures, which find carcasses by sight, New World vultures have a good sense of smell with which they locate carrion.

- King vulture, Sarcoramphus papa
- Andean condor, Vultur gryphus
- Black vulture, Coragyps atratus
- Turkey vulture, Cathartes aura
- Lesser yellow-headed vulture, Cathartes burrovianus
- Greater yellow-headed vulture, Cathartes melambrotus

== Osprey ==
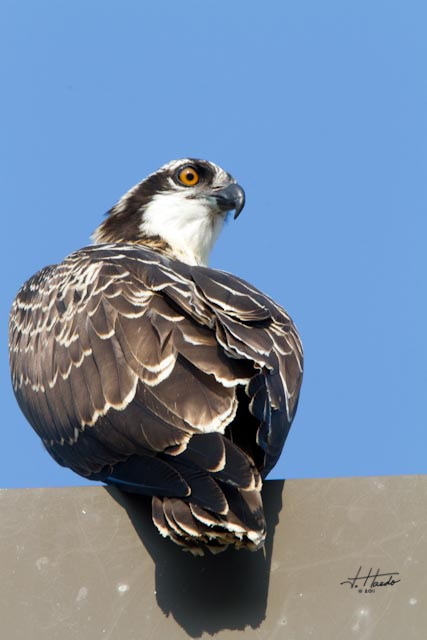
Osprey

Order: Accipitriformes Family: Pandionidae

The family Pandionidae contains only one species, the osprey. The osprey is a medium-large raptor which is a specialist fish-eater with a worldwide distribution.

- Osprey, Pandion haliaetus

== Hawks ==
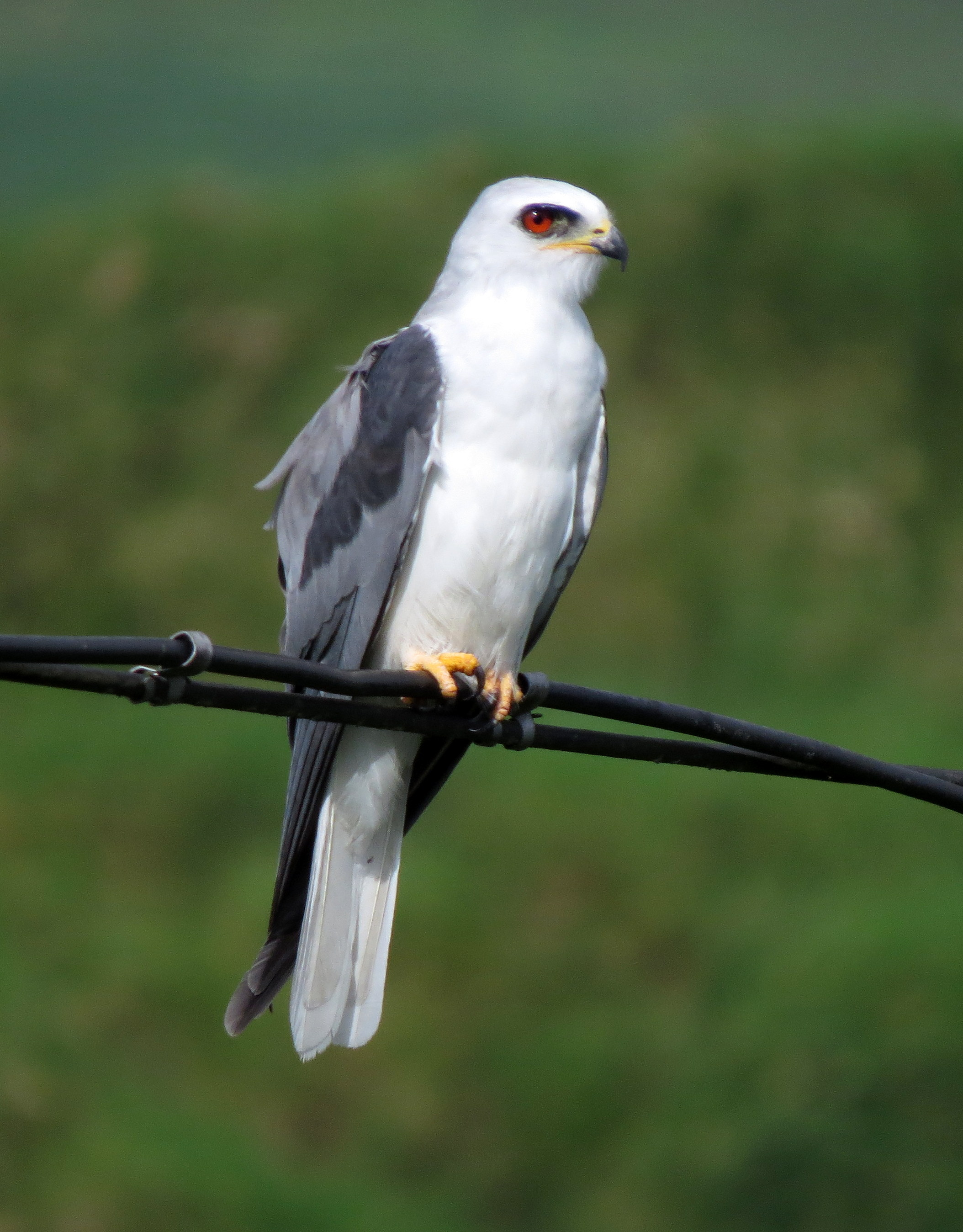
White-tailed kite

Order: Accipitriformes Family: Accipitridae

Accipitridae is a family of birds of prey, which includes hawks, eagles, kites, harriers, and Old World vultures. These birds have powerful hooked beaks for tearing flesh from their prey, strong legs, powerful talons, and keen eyesight.

- Pearl kite, Gampsonyx swainsonii
- White-tailed kite, Elanus leucurus
- Hook-billed kite, Chondrohierax uncinatus
- Gray-headed kite, Leptodon cayanensis
- Swallow-tailed kite, Elanoides forficatus
- Crested eagle, Morphnus guianensis
- Harpy eagle, Harpia harpyja
- Black hawk-eagle, Spizaetus tyrannus
- Black-and-white hawk-eagle, Spizaetus melanoleucus
- Ornate hawk-eagle, Spizaetus ornatus
- Black-and-chestnut eagle, Spizaetus isidori
- Black-collared hawk, Busarellus nigricollis
- Snail kite, Rostrhamus sociabilis
- Rufous-thighed kite, Harpagus diodon
- Mississippi kite, Ictinia mississippiensis
- Plumbeous kite, Ictinia plumbea
- Gray-bellied hawk, Accipiter poliogaster
- Sharp-shinned hawk, Accipiter striatus
- Bicolored hawk, Astur bicolor
- Cinereous harrier, Circus cinereus
- Long-winged harrier, Circus buffoni
- Tiny hawk, Microspizias superciliosus
- Crane hawk, Geranospiza caerulescens
- Savanna hawk, Buteogallus meridionalis
- Great black hawk, Buteogallus urubitinga
- Solitary eagle, Buteogallus solitarius
- Chaco eagle, Buteogallus coronatus
- Roadside hawk, Rupornis magnirostris
- Harris's hawk, Parabuteo unicinctus
- White-rumped hawk, Parabuteo leucorrhous
- White-tailed hawk, Geranoaetus albicaudatus
- Variable hawk, Geranoaetus polyosoma
- Black-chested buzzard-eagle, Geranoaetus melanoleucus
- Mantled hawk, Pseudastur polionotus
- Gray-lined hawk, Buteo nitidus
- Broad-winged hawk, Buteo platypterus
- White-throated hawk, Buteo albigula
- Short-tailed hawk, Buteo brachyurus
- Swainson's hawk, Buteo swainsoni
- Zone-tailed hawk, Buteo albonotatus
- Rufous-tailed hawk, Buteo ventralis

== Barn owls ==
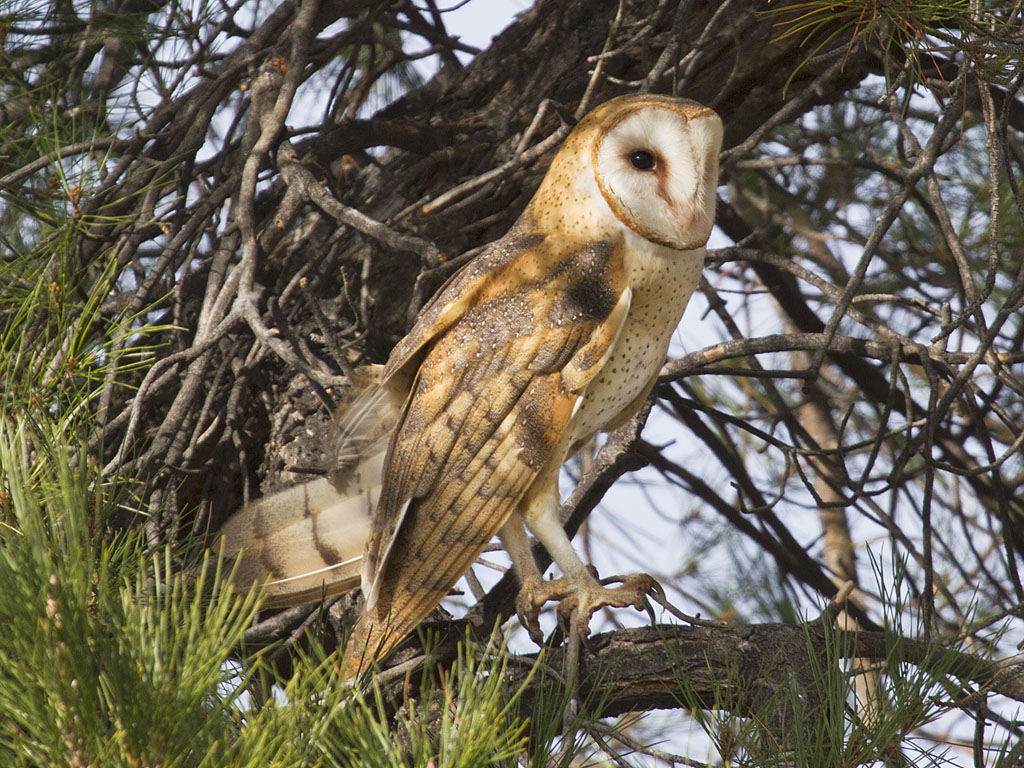
American barn owl

Order: Strigiformes Family: Tytonidae

Barn owls are medium to large owls with large heads and characteristic heart-shaped faces. They have long strong legs with powerful talons.

- American barn owl, Tyto furcata

== Owls ==
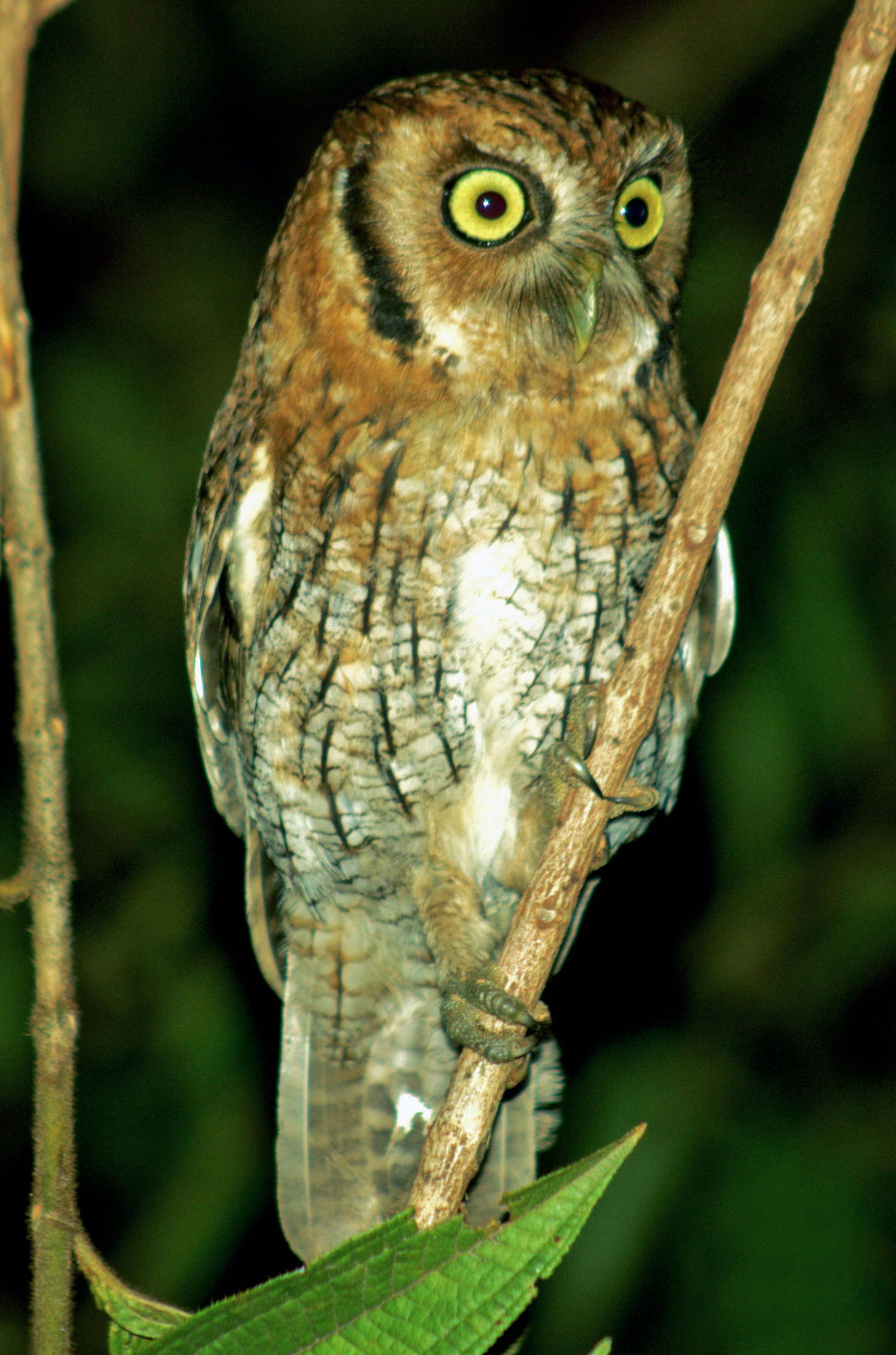
Tropical screech owl

Order: Strigiformes Family: Strigidae

The typical owls are small to large solitary nocturnal birds of prey. They have large forward-facing eyes and ears, a hawk-like beak and a conspicuous circle of feathers around each eye called a facial disk.

- Tropical screech-owl, Megascops choliba
- Montane forest screech-owl, Megascops hoyi
- Long-tufted screech-owl, Megascops sanctaecatarinae
- Black-capped screech-owl, Megascops atricapilla
- Spectacled owl, Pulsatrix perspicillata
- Tawny-browed owl, Pulsatrix koeniswaldiana
- Tropical horned owl, Bubo nacurutu
- Magellanic horned owl, Bubo magellanicus
- Rusty-barred owl, Strix hylophila
- Chaco owl, Strix chacoensis
- Rufous-legged owl, Strix rufipes
- Mottled owl, Strix virgata
- Black-banded owl, Strix huhula
- Yungas pygmy-owl, Glaucidium bolivianum
- Ferruginous pygmy-owl, Glaucidium brasilianum
- Austral pygmy-owl, Glaucidium nana
- Burrowing owl, Athene cunicularia
- Buff-fronted owl, Aegolius harrisii
- Striped owl, Asio clamator
- Stygian owl, Asio stygius
- Short-eared owl, Asio flammeus

== Trogons ==
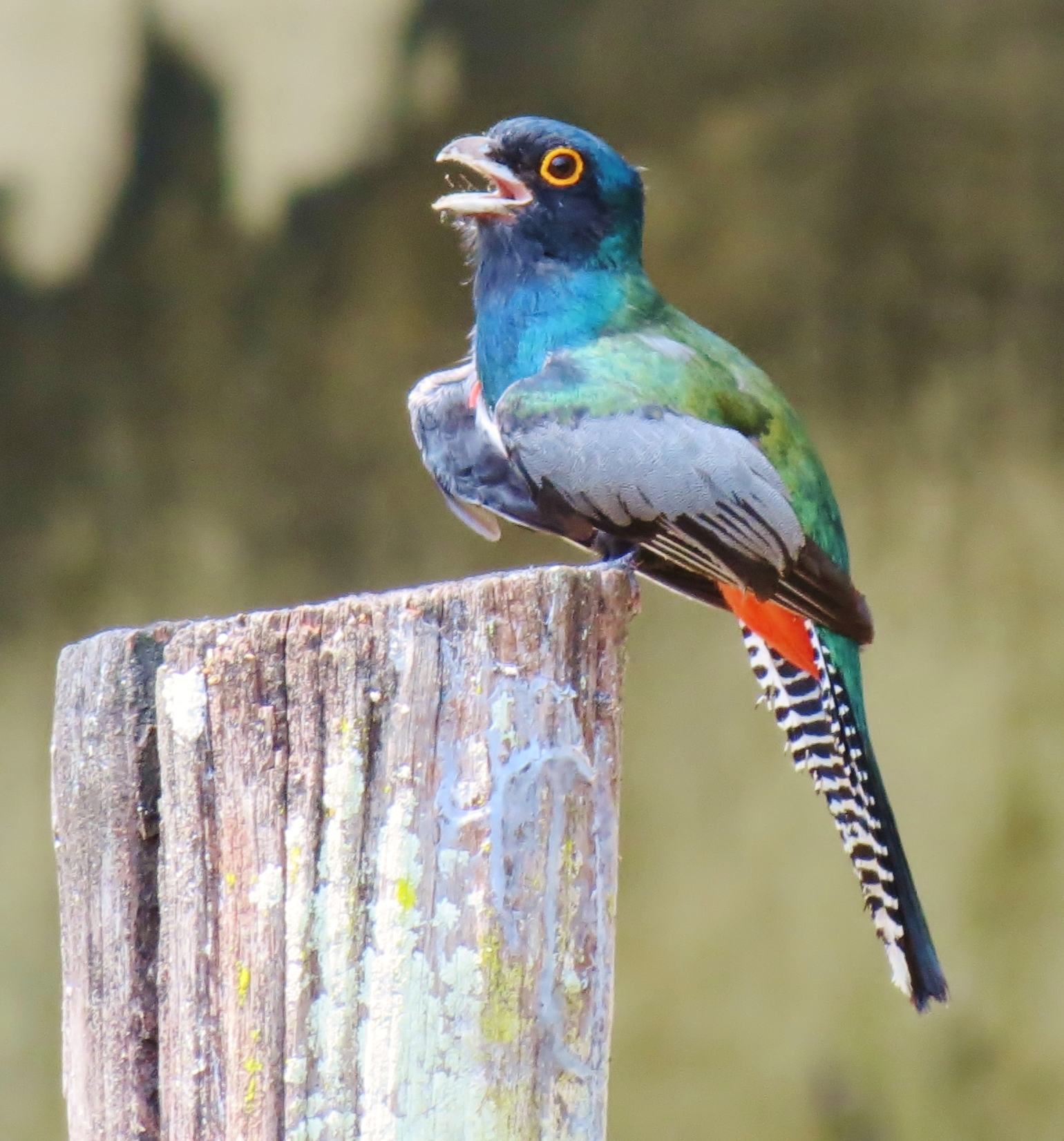
Blue-crowned trogon

Order: Trogoniformes Family: Trogonidae

The family Trogonidae includes trogons and quetzals. Found in tropical woodlands worldwide, they feed on insects and fruit, and their broad bills and weak legs reflect their diet and arboreal habits. Although their flight is fast, they are reluctant to fly any distance. Trogons have soft, often colorful, feathers with distinctive male and female plumage.

- Blue-crowned trogon, Trogon curucui
- Surucua trogon, Trogon surrucura
- Atlantic black-throated trogon, Trogon chrysochloros

== Motmots ==
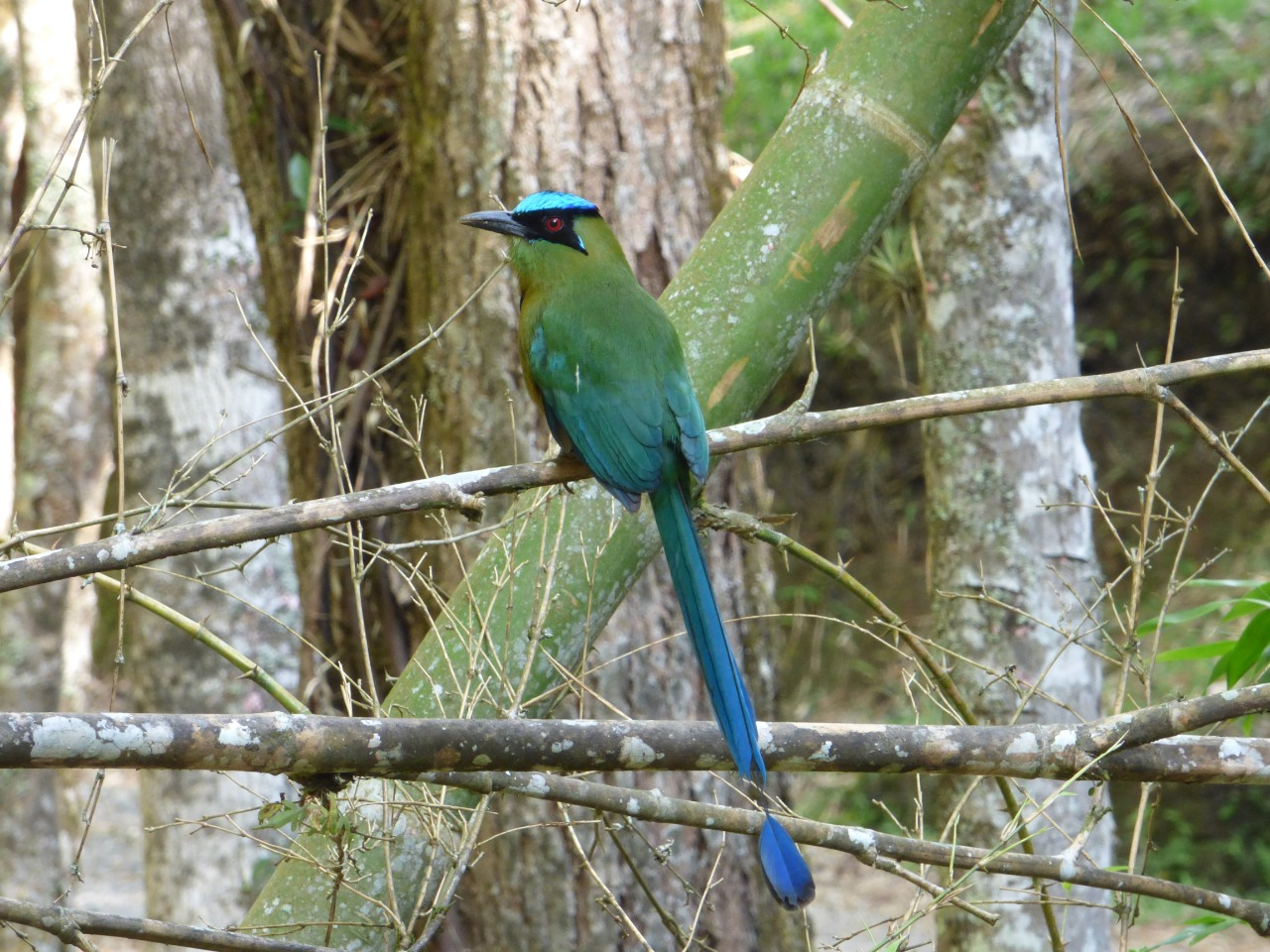
Amazonian motmot

Order: Coraciiformes Family: Momotidae

The motmots have colorful plumage and long, graduated tails which they display by waggling back and forth. In most of the species, the barbs near the ends of the two longest (central) tail feathers are weak and fall off, leaving a length of bare shaft and creating a racket-shaped tail.

- Rufous-capped motmot, Baryphthengus ruficapillus
- Amazonian motmot, Momotus momota

== Kingfishers ==
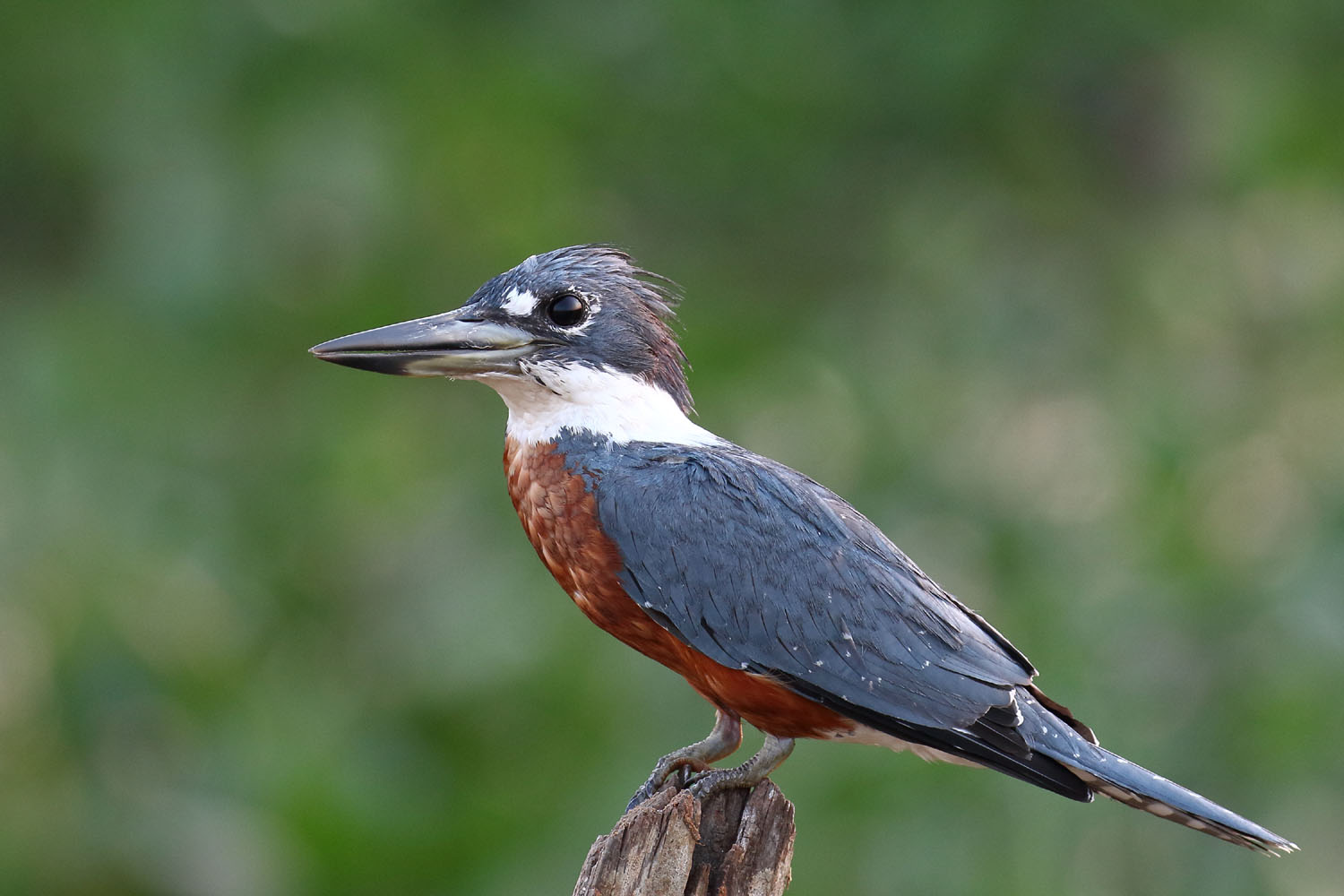
Ringed kingfisher

Order: Coraciiformes Family: Alcedinidae

Kingfishers are medium-sized birds with large heads, long, pointed bills, short legs, and stubby tails.

- Ringed kingfisher, Megaceryle torquata
- Amazon kingfisher, Chloroceryle amazona
- American pygmy kingfisher, Chloroceryle aenea
- Green kingfisher, Chloroceryle americana
- Green-and-rufous kingfisher, Chloroceryle inda (U)

== Jacamars ==
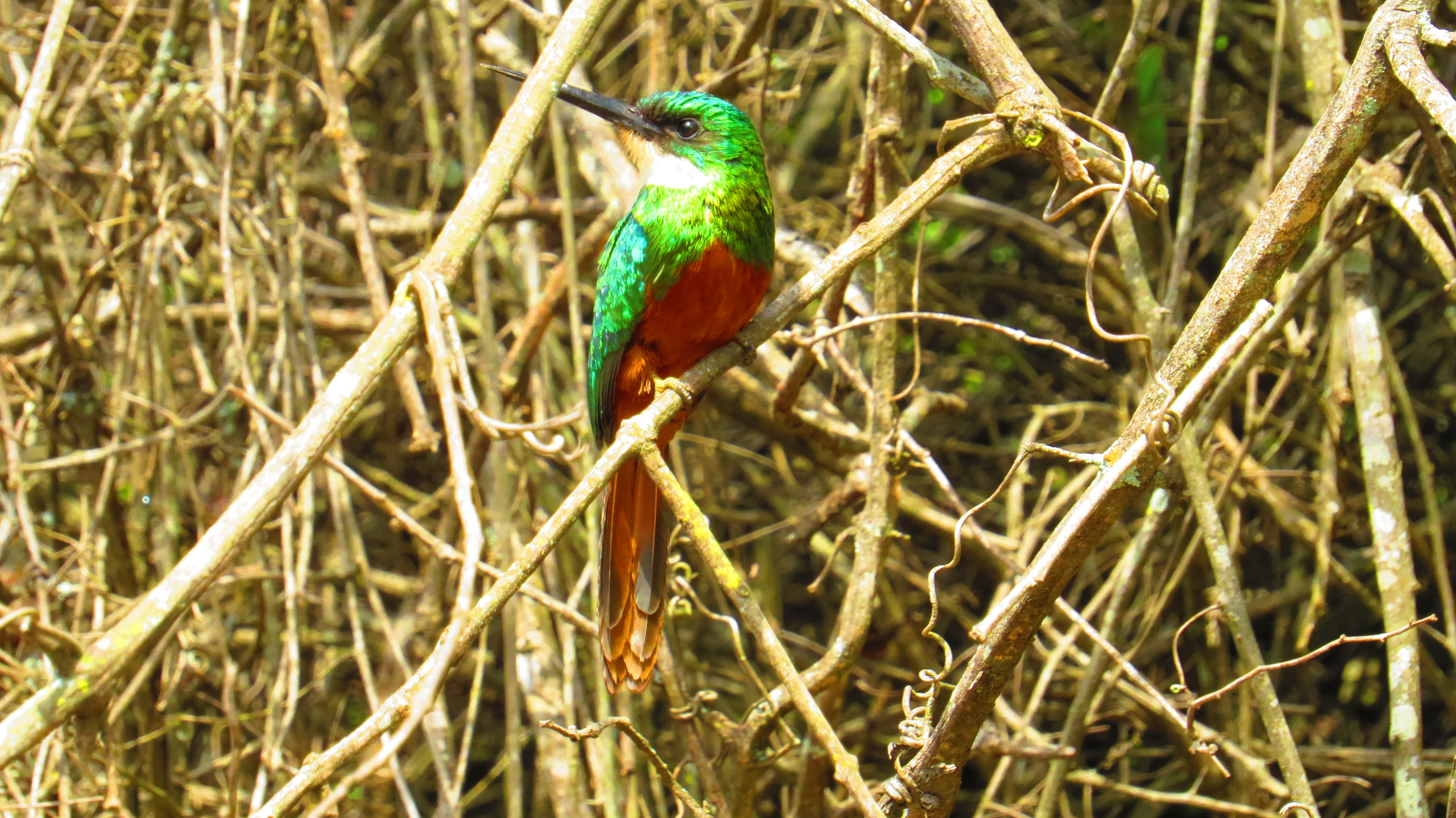
Rufous-tailed jacamar

Order: Galbuliformes Family: Galbulidae

The jacamars are near passerine birds from tropical South America, with a range that extends up to Mexico. They feed on insects caught on the wing, and are glossy, elegant birds with long bills and tails. In appearance and behavior they resemble the Old World bee-eaters, although they are more closely related to puffbirds.

- Rufous-tailed jacamar, Galbula ruficauda (U)

== Puffbirds ==
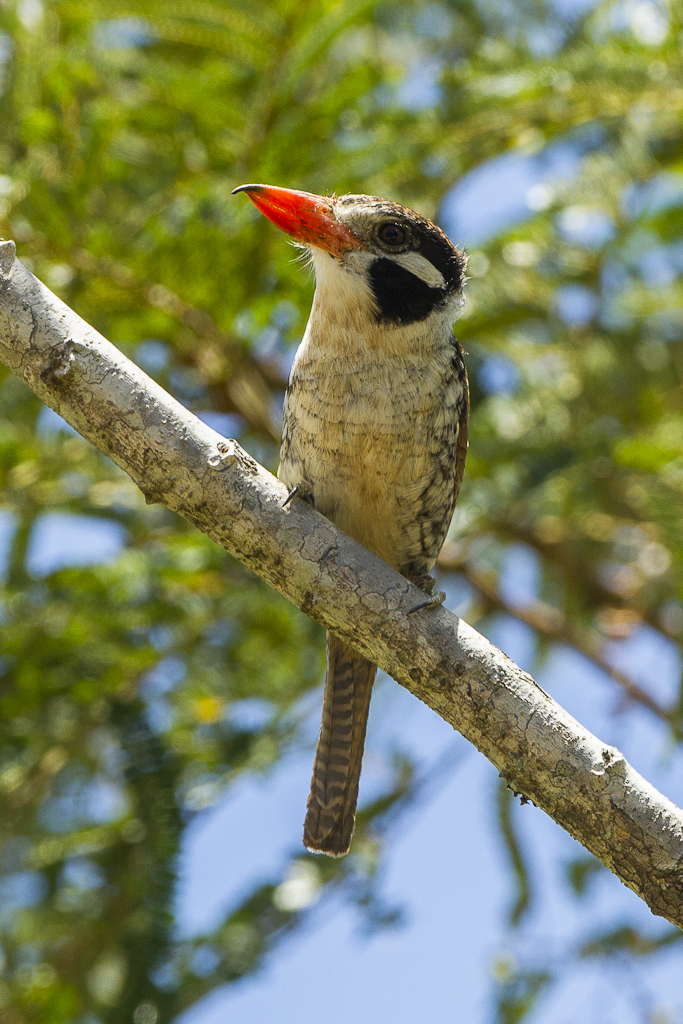
White-eared puffbird

Order: Galbuliformes Family: Bucconidae

The puffbirds are related to the jacamars and have the same range, but lack the iridescent colors of that family. They are mainly brown, rufous or gray, with large heads and flattened bills with hooked tips. The loose abundant plumage and short tails makes them look stout and puffy, giving rise to the English common name of the family.

- Buff-bellied puffbird, Notharchus swainsoni
- White-eared puffbird, Nystalus chacuru
- Spot-backed puffbird, Nystalus maculatus
- Rusty-breasted nunlet, Nonnula rubecula

== Toucans ==
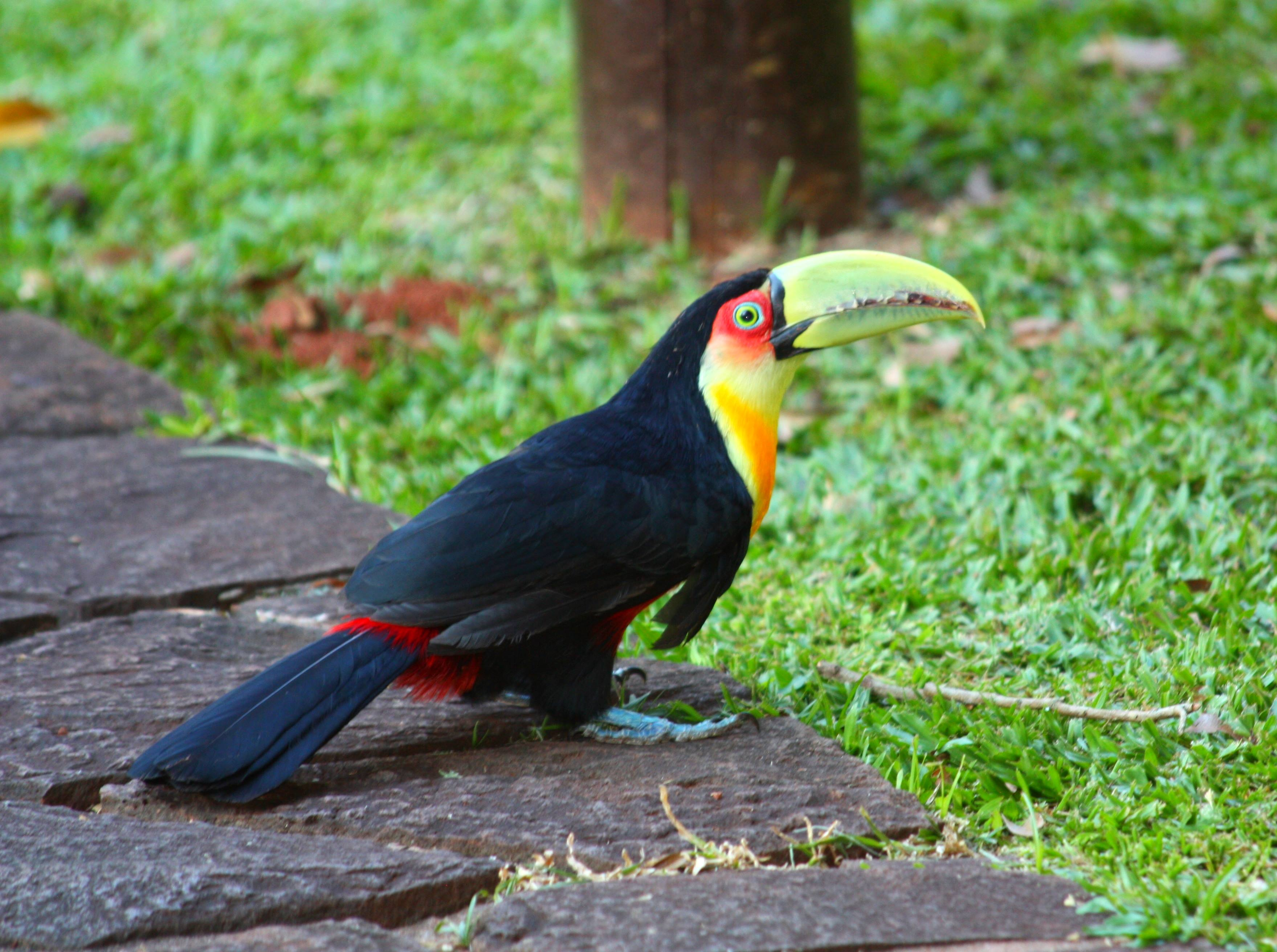
Red-breasted toucan

Order: Piciformes Family: Ramphastidae

Toucans are near passerine birds from the Neotropics. They are brightly marked and have enormous, colorful bills which in some species amount to half their body length.

- Toco toucan, Ramphastos toco
- Red-breasted toucan, Ramphastos dicolorus
- Spot-billed toucanet, Selenidera maculirostris
- Saffron toucanet, Pteroglossus bailloni
- Chestnut-eared aracari, Pteroglossus castanotis

== Woodpeckers ==
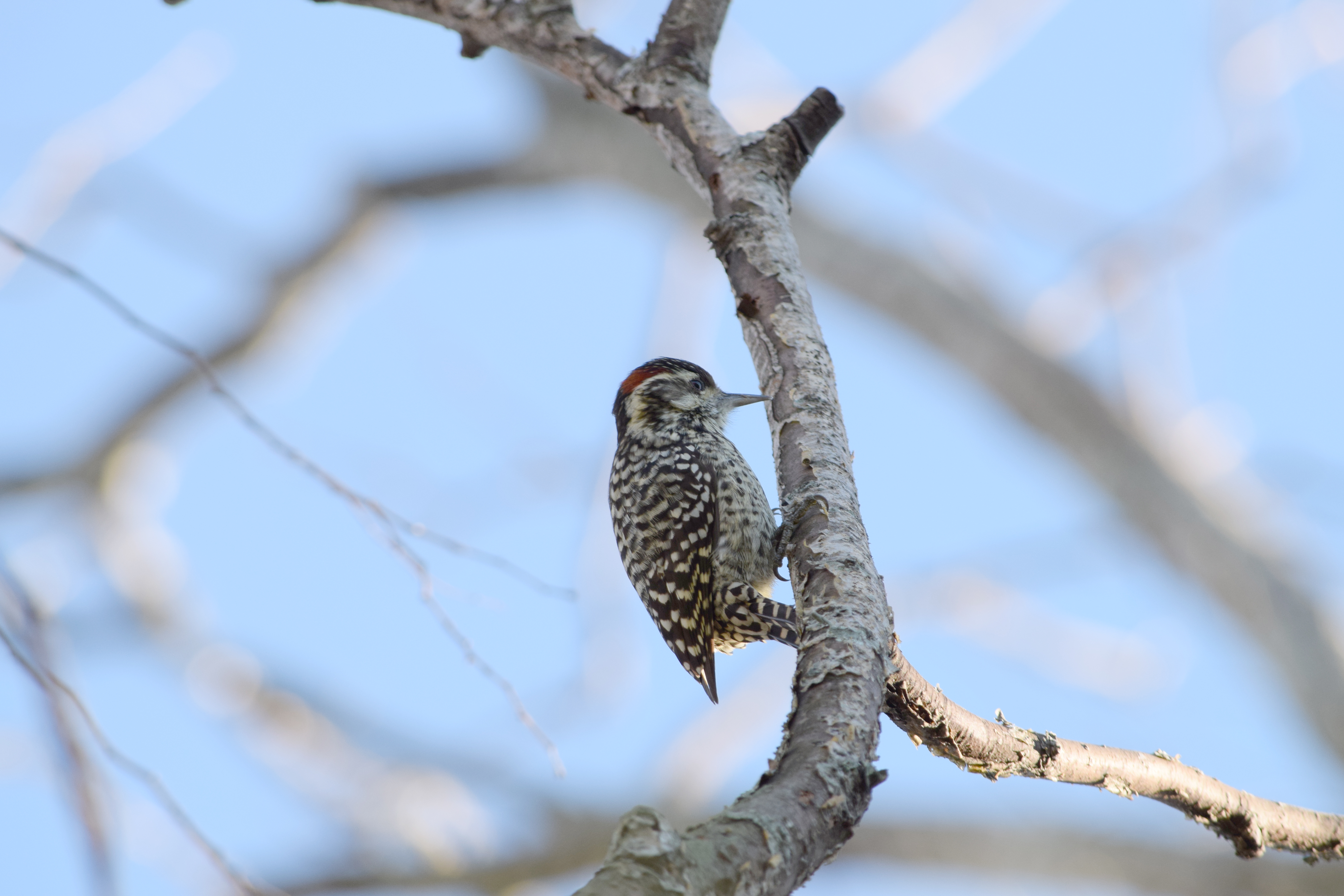
Checkered woodpecker

Order: Piciformes Family: Picidae

Woodpeckers are small to medium-sized birds with chisel-like beaks, short legs, stiff tails, and long tongues used for capturing insects. Some species have feet with two toes pointing forward and two backward, while several species have only three toes. Many woodpeckers have the habit of tapping noisily on tree trunks with their beaks.

- White-barred piculet, Picumnus cirratus
- Ochre-collared piculet, Picumnus temminckii
- White-wedged piculet, Picumnus albosquamatus
- Mottled piculet, Picumnus nebulosus
- White woodpecker, Melanerpes candidus
- Yellow-fronted woodpecker, Melanerpes flavifrons
- White-fronted woodpecker, Melanerpes cactorum
- Smoky-brown woodpecker, Dryobates fumigatus
- White-spotted woodpecker, Dryobates spilogaster
- Checkered woodpecker, Dryobates mixtus
- Striped woodpecker, Dryobates lignarius
- Little woodpecker, Dryobates passerinus
- Dot-fronted woodpecker, Dryobates frontalis
- Robust woodpecker, Campephilus robustus
- Crimson-crested woodpecker, Campephilus melanoleucos
- Cream-backed woodpecker, Campephilus leucopogon
- Magellanic woodpecker, Campephilus magellanicus
- Lineated woodpecker, Dryocopus lineatus
- Black-bodied woodpecker, Dryocopus schulzi
- Helmeted woodpecker, Celeus galeatus
- Pale-crested woodpecker, Celeus lugubris
- Blond-crested woodpecker, Celeus flavescens
- Golden-green woodpecker, Piculus chrysochloros
- White-browed woodpecker, Piculus aurulentus
- Golden-olive woodpecker, Colaptes rubiginosus
- Green-barred woodpecker, Colaptes melanochloros
- Chilean flicker, Colaptes pitius
- Andean flicker, Colaptes rupicola
- Campo flicker, Colaptes campestris

== Seriemas ==
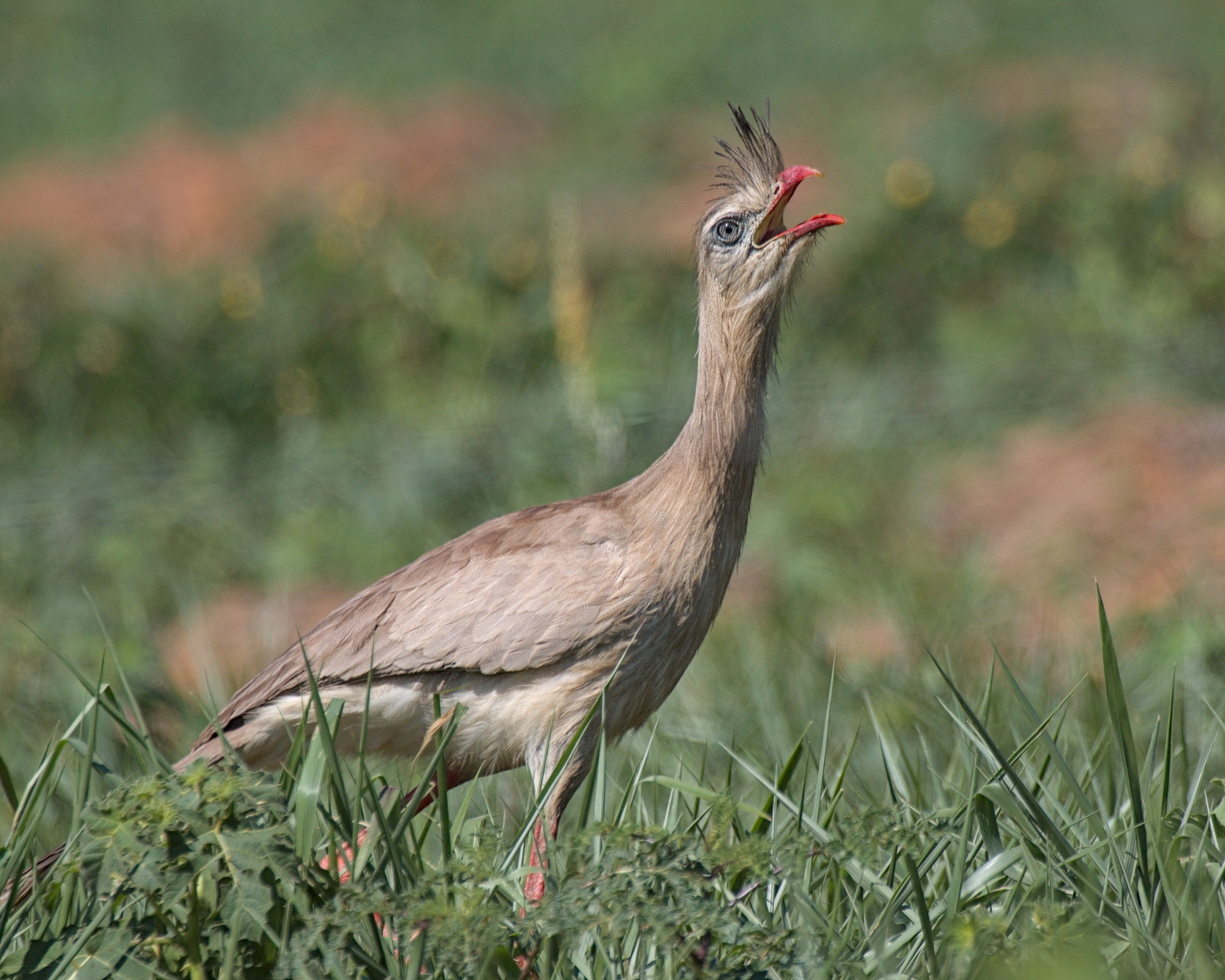
Red-legged seriema

Order: Cariamiformes Family: Cariamidae

The seriemas are terrestrial birds which run rather than fly (though they are able to fly for short distances). They have long legs, necks and tails, but only short wings, reflecting their way of life. They are brownish birds with short bills and erectile crests, found on fairly-dry open grasslands.

- Red-legged seriema, Cariama cristata
- Black-legged seriema, Chunga burmeisteri

== Falcons ==
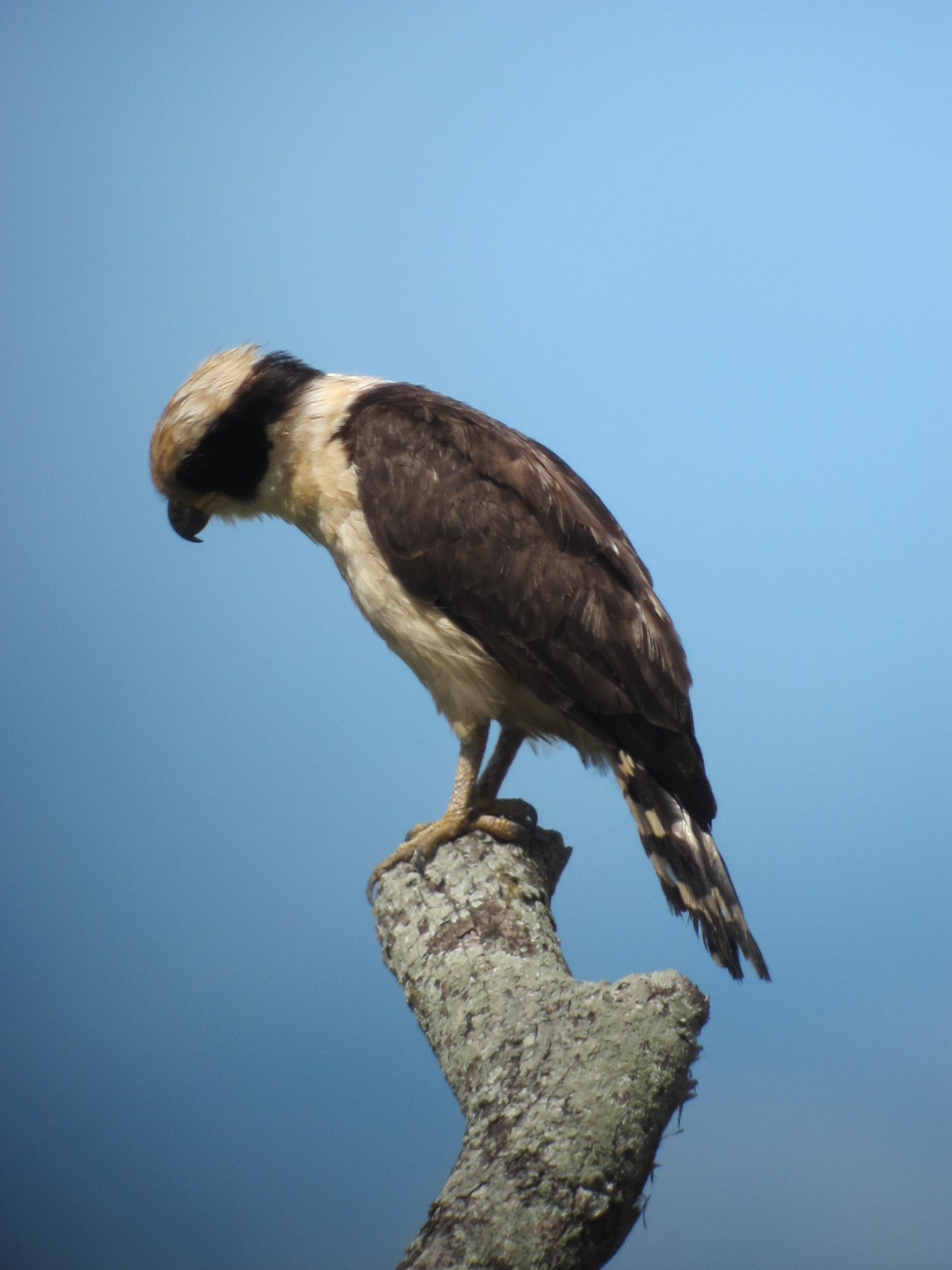
Laughing falcon

Order: Falconiformes Family: Falconidae

Falconidae is a family of diurnal birds of prey. They differ from hawks, eagles and kites in that they kill with their beaks instead of their talons.

- Laughing falcon, Herpetotheres cachinnans
- Barred forest-falcon, Micrastur ruficollis
- Collared forest-falcon, Micrastur semitorquatus
- Spot-winged falconet, Spiziapteryx circumcincta
- Crested caracara, Caracara plancus
- Mountain caracara, Phalcoboenus megalopterus
- White-throated caracara, Phalcoboenus albogularis
- Striated caracara, Phalcoboenus australis
- Yellow-headed caracara, Milvago chimachima
- Chimango caracara, Milvago chimango
- American kestrel, Falco sparverius
- Bat falcon, Falco rufigularis
- Orange-breasted falcon, Falco deiroleucus
- Aplomado falcon, Falco femoralis
- Peregrine falcon, Falco peregrinus

== New World and African parrots ==
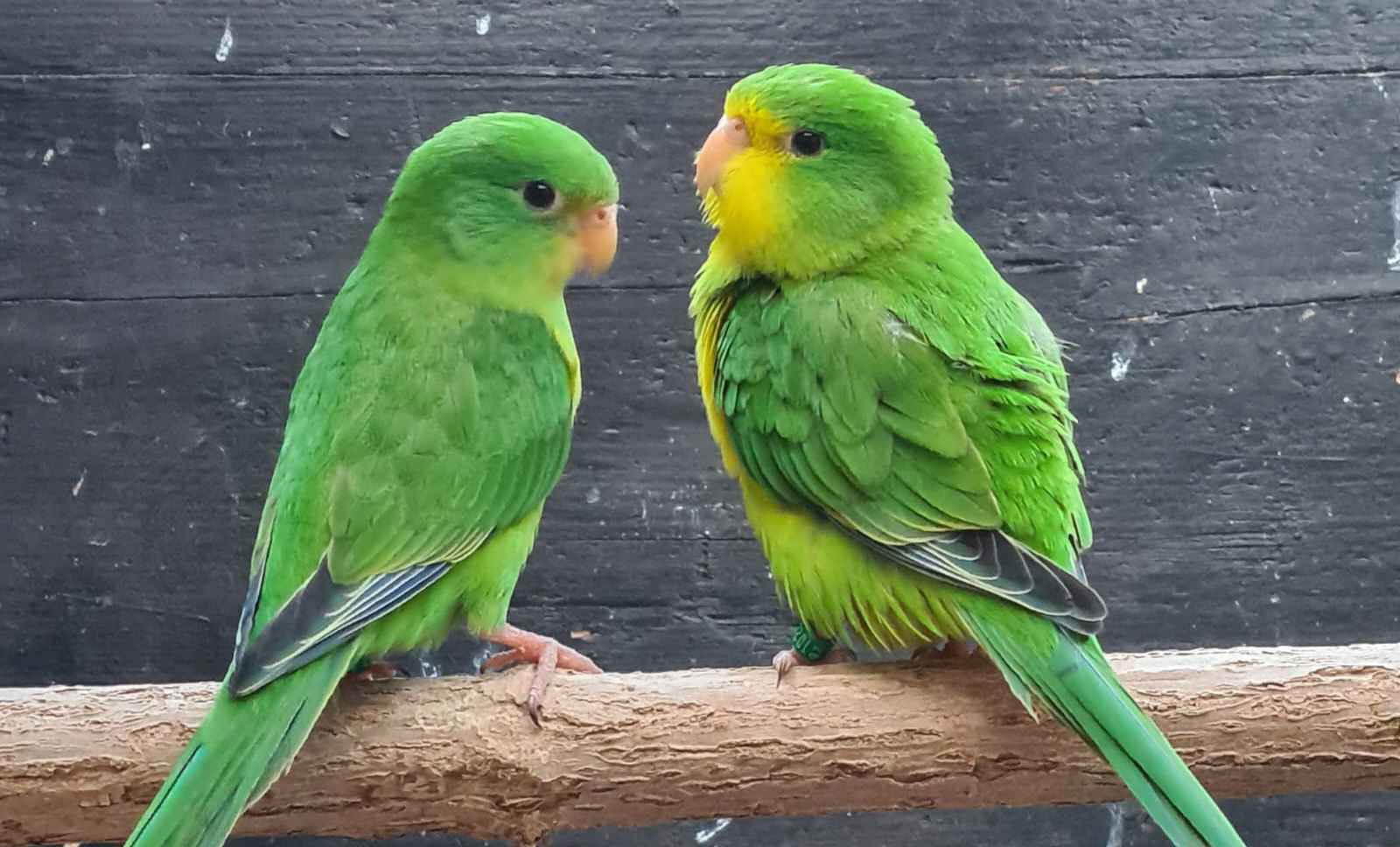
Mountain parakeet

Order: Psittaciformes Family: Psittacidae

Parrots are small to large birds with a characteristic curved beak. Their upper mandibles have slight mobility in the joint with the skull and they have a generally erect stance. All parrots are zygodactyl, having the four toes on each foot placed two at the front and two to the back.

- Gray-hooded parakeet, Psilopsiagon aymara
- Mountain parakeet, Psilopsiagon aurifrons
- Andean parakeet, Bolborhynchus orbygnesius
- Monk parakeet, Myiopsitta monachus
- Yellow-chevroned parakeet, Brotogeris chiriri
- Pileated parrot, Pionopsitta pileata
- Blue-bellied parrot, Triclaria malachitacea (U)
- Scaly-headed parrot, Pionus maximiliani
- Vinaceous-breasted amazon, Amazona vinacea
- Tucuman amazon, Amazona tucumana
- Red-spectacled amazon, Amazona pretrei (U)
- Turquoise-fronted amazon, Amazona aestiva
- Scaly-naped amazon, Amazona mercenarius (V)
- Cobalt-rumped parrotlet, Forpus xanthopterygius
- Blaze-winged parakeet, Pyrrhura devillei (U)
- Maroon-bellied parakeet, Pyrrhura frontalis
- Green-cheeked parakeet, Pyrrhura molinae
- Austral parakeet, Enicognathus ferrugineus
- Slender-billed parakeet, Enicognathus leptorhynchus (V)
- Burrowing parakeet, Cyanoliseus patagonus
- Glaucous macaw, Anodorhynchus glaucus (possibly extinct)
- Peach-fronted parakeet, Eupsittula aurea
- Nanday parakeet, Aratinga nenday
- Blue-winged macaw, Primolius maracana (extirpated)
- Yellow-collared macaw, Primolius auricollis
- Blue-and-yellow macaw, Ara ararauna (U)
- Military macaw, Ara militaris
- Red-and-green macaw, Ara chloropterus (extirpated)
- Blue-crowned parakeet, Thectocercus acuticaudatus
- Mitred parakeet, Psittacara mitratus
- White-eyed parakeet, Psittacara leucophthalmus

== Antbirds ==
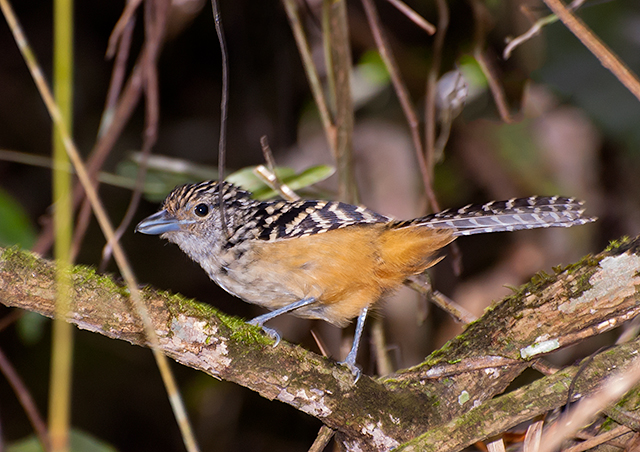
Spot-backed antshrike

Order: Passeriformes Family: Thamnophilidae

The antbirds are a large family of small passerine birds of subtropical and tropical Central and South America. They are forest birds which tend to feed on insects at or near the ground. A sizable minority of them specialize in following columns of army ants to eat small invertebrates that leave their hiding places to flee from the ants. Many species lack bright color; brown, black, and white are the dominant tones.

- Spot-backed antshrike, Hypoedaleus guttatus
- Giant antshrike, Batara cinerea
- Large-tailed antshrike, Mackenziaena leachii
- Tufted antshrike, Mackenziaena severa
- Great antshrike, Taraba major
- White-bearded antshrike, Biatas nigropectus
- Barred antshrike, Thamnophilus doliatus
- Rufous-capped antshrike, Thamnophilus ruficapillus
- Variable antshrike, Thamnophilus caerulescens
- Plain antvireo, Dysithamnus mentalis
- Black-capped antwren, Herpsilochmus atricapillus
- Rufous-margined antwren, Herpsilochmus frater
- Stripe-backed antbird, Myrmorchilus strigilatus
- Bertoni's antbird, Drymophila rubricollis
- Dusky-tailed antbird, Drymophila malura
- Streak-capped antwren, Terenura maculata
- White-shouldered fire-eye, Pyriglena leucoptera

== Crescentchests ==
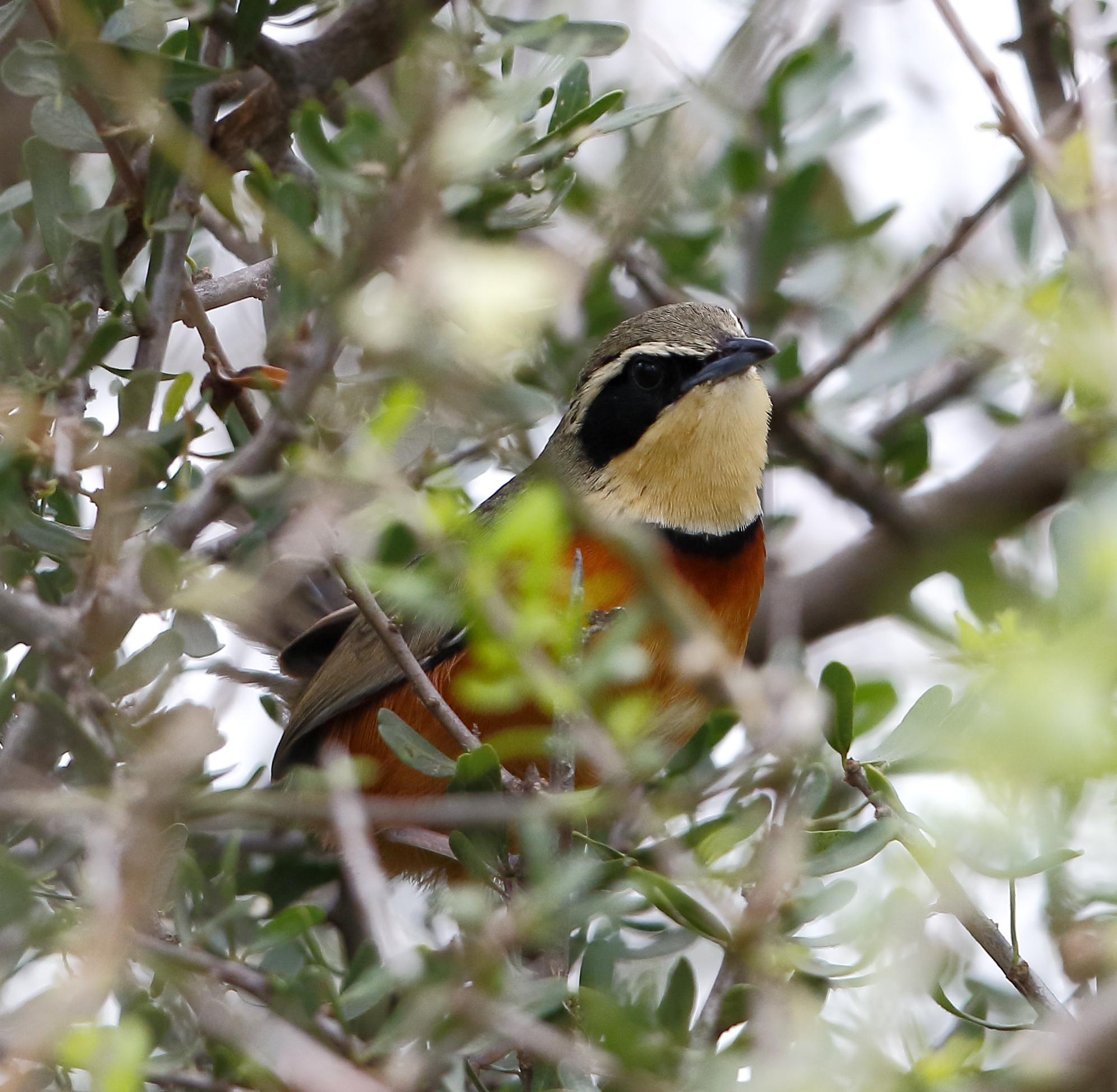
Olive-crowned crescentchest

Order: Passeriformes Family: Melanopareiidae

These are smallish birds which inhabit regions of arid scrub. They have a band across the chest which gives them their name.

- Collared crescentchest, Melanopareia torquata (U)
- Olive-crowned crescentchest, Melanopareia maximiliani

== Gnateaters ==
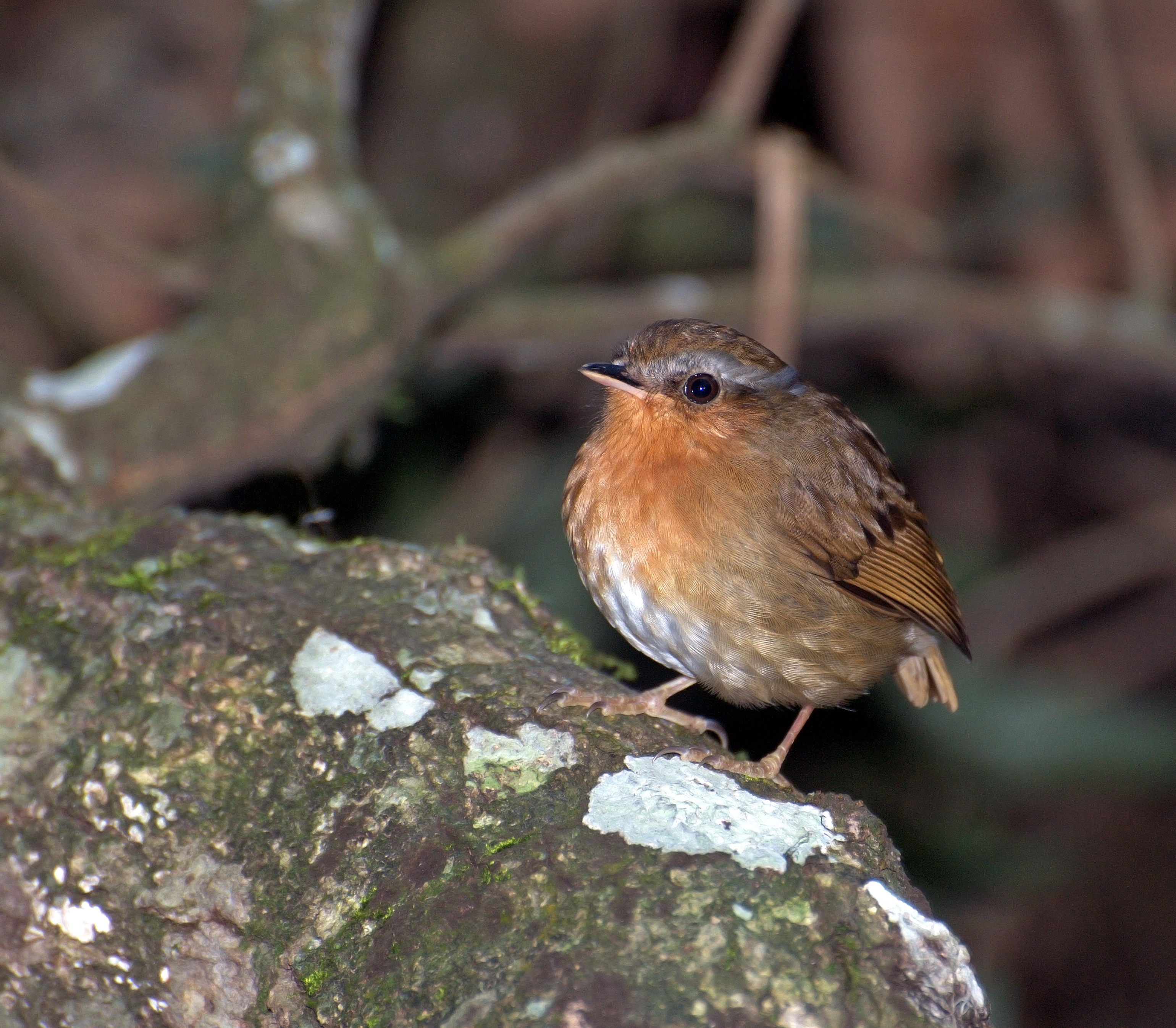
Rufous gnateater

Order: Passeriformes Family: Conopophagidae

The gnateaters are round, short-tailed and long-legged birds, which are closely related to the antbirds.

- Rufous gnateater, Conopophaga lineata

== Antpittas ==
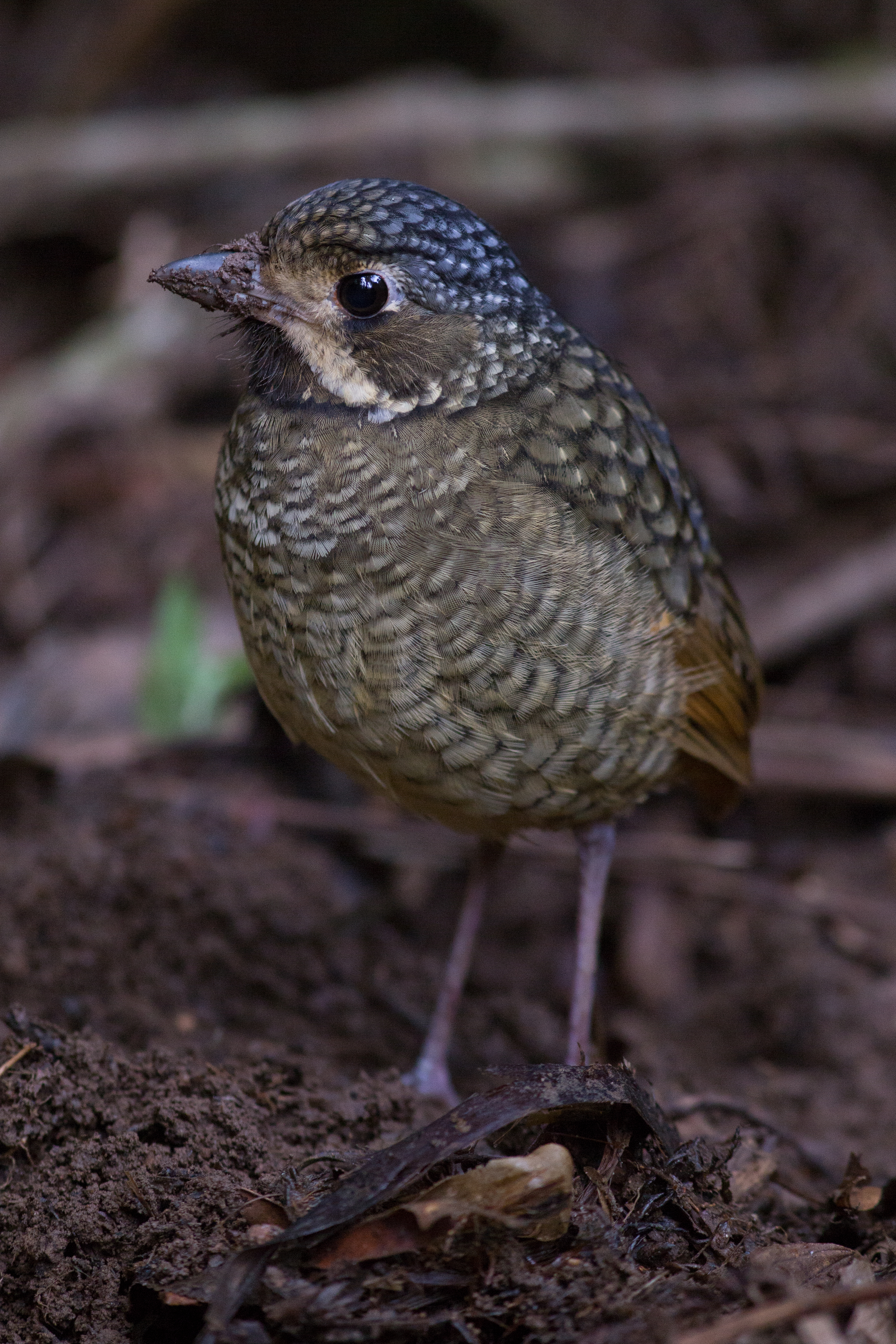
Variegated antpitta

Order: Passeriformes Family: Grallariidae

The members of this small family are found across northern South America and into Central America. They are forest birds, usually seen on the ground or in the low understory.

- Variegated antpitta, Grallaria varia
- White-throated antpitta, Grallaria albigula
- Speckle-breasted antpitta, Cryptopezus nattereri

== Tapaculos ==
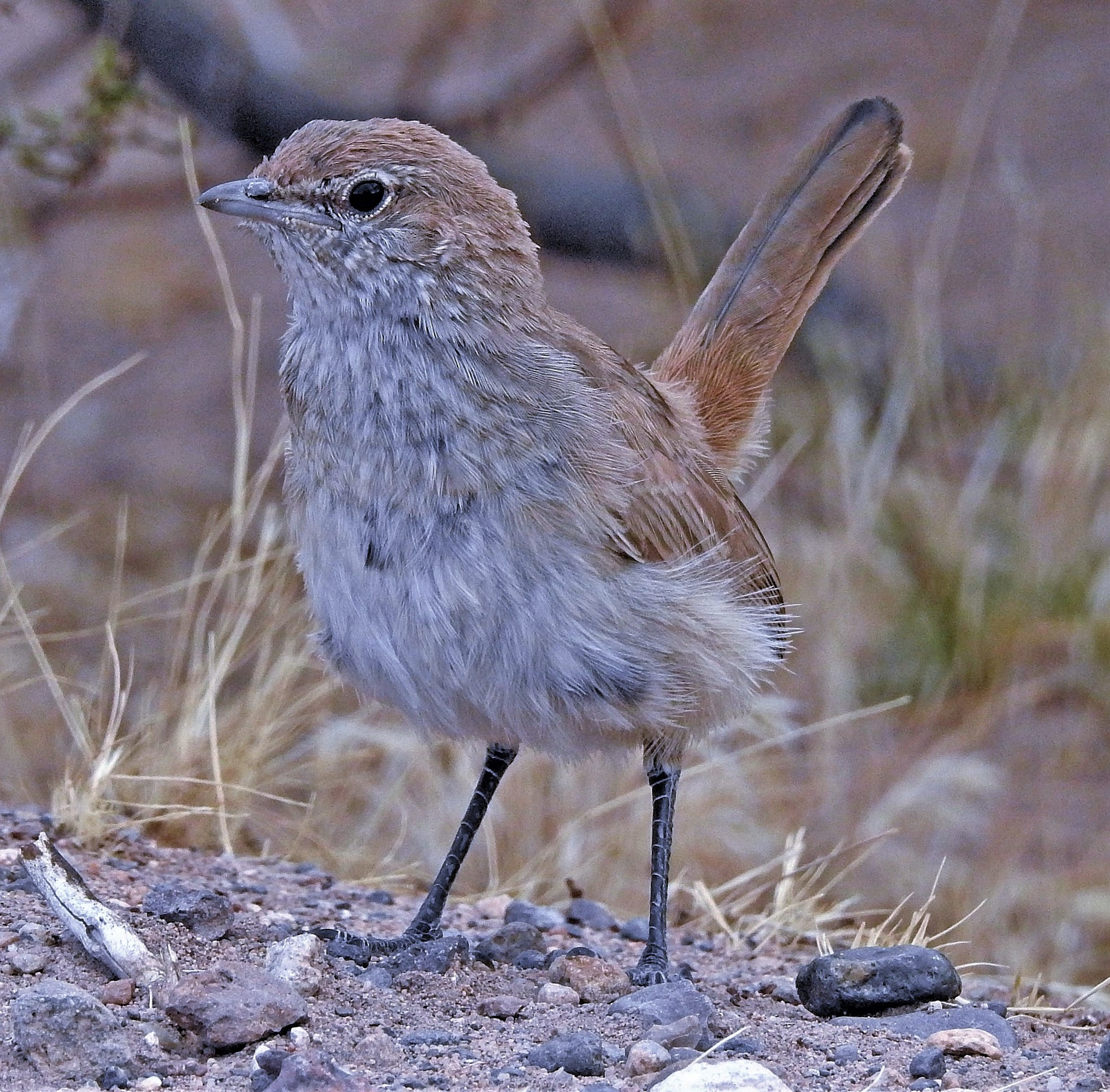
Sandy gallito

Order: Passeriformes Family: Rhinocryptidae

The tapaculos are small suboscine passeriform birds with numerous species in South and Central America. They are terrestrial species that fly only poorly on their short wings. They have strong legs, well-suited to their habitat of grassland or forest undergrowth. The tail is cocked and pointed towards the head.

- Spotted bamboowren, Psilorhamphus guttatus
- Crested gallito, Rhinocrypta lanceolata
- Sandy gallito, Teledromas fuscus (E)
- Chestnut-throated huet-huet, Pteroptochos castaneus
- Black-throated huet-huet, Pteroptochos tarnii
- Chucao tapaculo, Scelorchilus rubecula
- Ochre-flanked tapaculo, Eugralla paradoxa
- Planalto tapaculo, Scytalopus pachecoi
- Magellanic tapaculo, Scytalopus magellanicus
- Zimmer's tapaculo, Scytalopus zimmeri
- White-browed tapaculo, Scytalopus superciliaris (E)

== Antthrushes ==
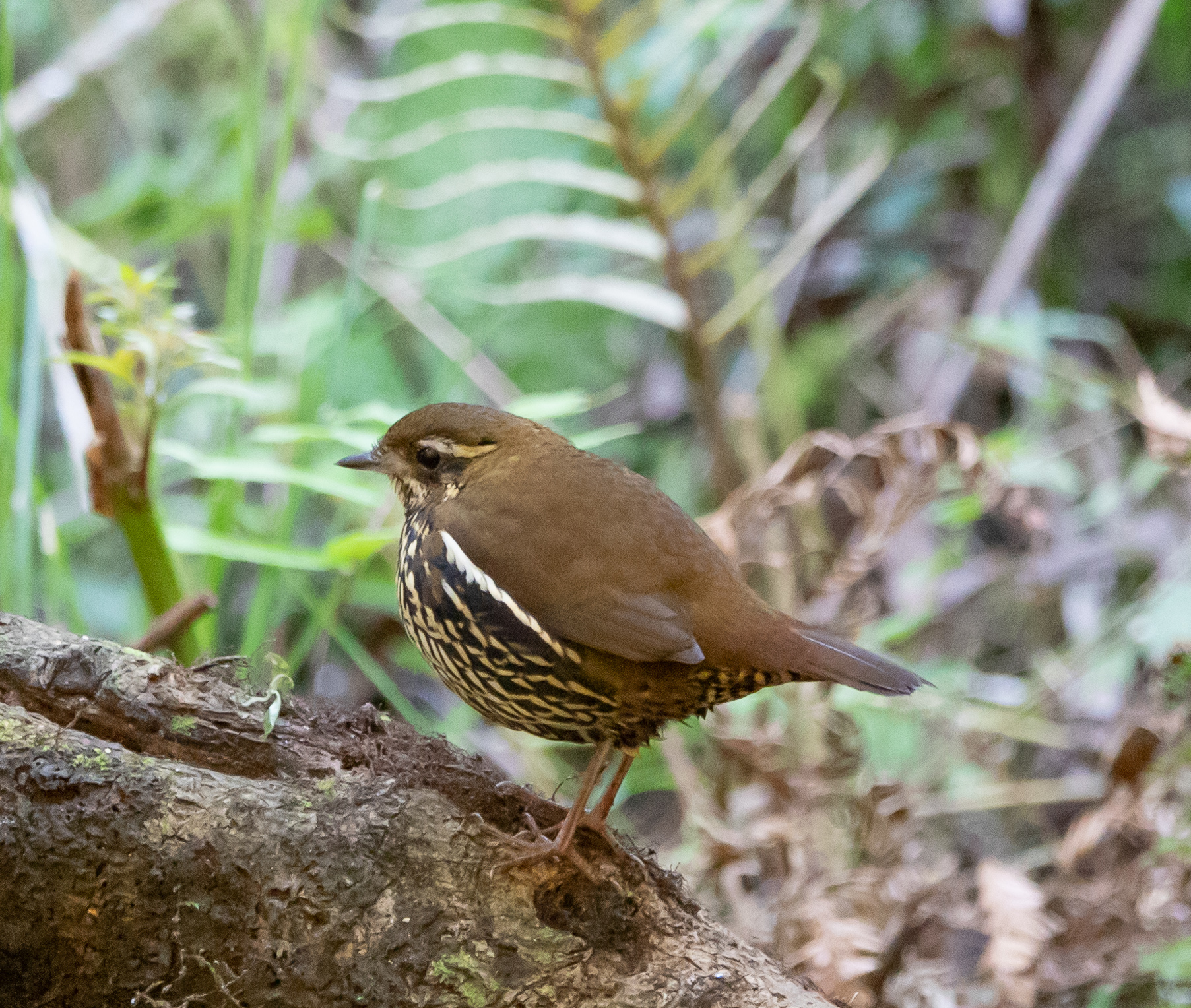
Rufous-tailed antthrush

Order: Passeriformes Family: Formicariidae

Antthrushes resemble small rails with strong, longish legs, very short tails, and stout bills.

- Short-tailed antthrush, Chamaeza campanisona
- Rufous-tailed antthrush, Chamaeza ruficauda

== Ovenbirds ==
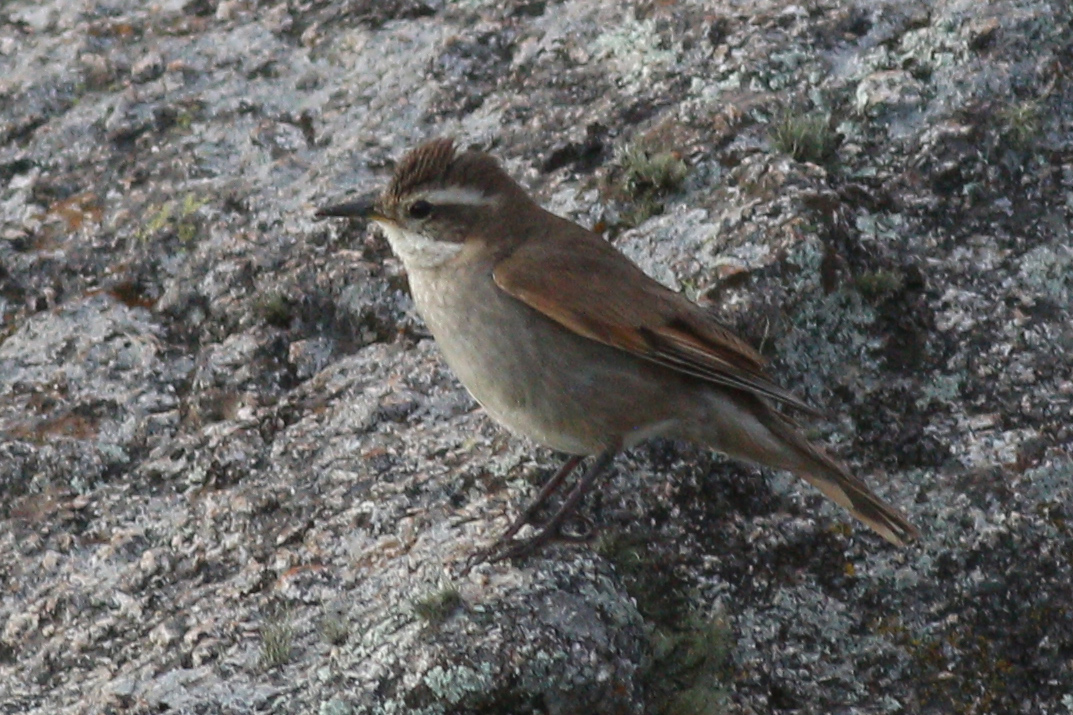
Córdoba cinclodes

Order: Passeriformes Family: Furnariidae

Ovenbirds comprise a large family of small sub-oscine passerine bird species found in Central and South America. They are a diverse group of insectivores which gets its name from the elaborate "oven-like" clay nests built by some species, although others build stick nests or nest in tunnels or clefts in rock. The woodcreepers are brownish birds which maintain an upright vertical posture, supported by their stiff tail vanes. They feed mainly on insects taken from tree trunks.

- Rufous-breasted leaftosser, Sclerurus scansor
- Slender-billed miner, Geositta tenuirostris
- Common miner, Geositta cunicularia
- Puna miner, Geositta punensis
- Rufous-banded miner, Geositta rufipennis
- Short-billed miner, Geositta antarctica
- Creamy-rumped miner, Geositta isabellina
- Olivaceous woodcreeper, Sittasomus griseicapillus
- Plain-winged woodcreeper, Dendrocincla turdina
- Black-banded woodcreeper, Dendrocolaptes picumnus
- Planalto woodcreeper, Dendrocolaptes platyrostris
- White-throated woodcreeper, Xiphocolaptes albicollis
- Great rufous woodcreeper, Xiphocolaptes major
- Lesser woodcreeper, Xiphorhynchus fuscus
- Red-billed scythebill, Campylorhamphus trochilirostris
- Black-billed scythebill, Campylorhamphus falcularius
- Scimitar-billed woodcreeper, Drymornis bridgesii
- Narrow-billed woodcreeper, Lepidocolaptes angustirostris
- Scalloped woodcreeper, Lepidocolaptes falcinellus
- Atlantic plain-xenops, Xenops minutus
- Streaked xenops, Xenops rutilans
- White-throated treerunner, Pygarrhichas albogularis
- Rock earthcreeper, Ochetorhynchus andaecola
- Straight-billed earthcreeper, Ochetorhynchus ruficaudus
- Band-tailed earthcreeper, Ochetorhynchus phoenicurus
- Bolivian earthcreeper, Tarphonomus harterti
- Chaco earthcreeper, Tarphonomus certhioides
- Rufous hornero, Furnarius rufus
- Crested hornero, Furnarius cristatus
- Sharp-tailed streamcreeper, Lochmias nematura
- Wren-like rushbird, Phleocryptes melanops
- Curve-billed reedhaunter, Limnornis curvirostris
- Patagonian forest earthcreeper, Upucerthia saturatior
- Scale-throated earthcreeper, Upucerthia dumetaria
- Buff-breasted earthcreeper, Upucerthia validirostris
- Buff-winged cinclodes, Cinclodes fuscus
- Blackish cinclodes, Cinclodes antarcticus
- Cordoba cinclodes, Cinclodes comechingonus (E)
- Olrog's cinclodes, Cinclodes olrogi (E)
- Cream-winged cinclodes, Cinclodes albiventris
- Gray-flanked cinclodes, Cinclodes oustaleti
- White-winged cinclodes, Cinclodes atacamensis
- Dark-bellied cinclodes, Cinclodes patagonicus
- Sharp-billed treehunter, Heliobletus contaminatus
- Black-capped foliage-gleaner, Philydor atricapillus
- White-browed foliage-gleaner, Anabacerthia amaurotis
- Ochre-breasted foliage-gleaner, Anabacerthia lichtensteini
- Buff-browed foliage-gleaner, Syndactyla rufosuperciliata
- Buff-fronted foliage-gleaner, Dendroma rufa
- Canebrake groundcreeper, Clibanornis dendrocolaptoides
- White-eyed foliage-gleaner, Automolus leucophthalmus
- Pearled treerunner, Margarornis squamiger (U)
- Thorn-tailed rayadito, Aphrastura spinicauda
- Des Murs's wiretail, Sylviorthorhynchus desmursii
- Tawny tit-spinetail, Sylviorthorhynchus yanacensis
- Brown-capped tit-spinetail, Leptasthenura fuliginiceps
- Tufted tit-spinetail, Leptasthenura platensis
- Plain-mantled tit-spinetail, Leptasthenura aegithaloides
- Araucaria tit-spinetail, Leptasthenura setaria
- Rufous-fronted thornbird, Phacellodomus rufifrons
- Streak-fronted thornbird, Phacellodomus striaticeps
- Little thornbird, Phacellodomus sibilatrix
- Spot-breasted thornbird, Phacellodomus maculipectus
- Freckle-breasted thornbird, Phacellodomus striaticollis
- Greater thornbird, Phacellodomus ruber
- Orange-breasted thornbird, Phacellodomus ferrugineigula (U)
- Firewood-gatherer, Anumbius annumbi
- Lark-like brushrunner, Coryphistera alaudina
- Creamy-breasted canastero, Asthenes dorbignyi
- Short-billed canastero, Asthenes baeri
- Hudson's canastero, Asthenes hudsoni
- Austral canastero, Asthenes anthoides
- Scribble-tailed canastero, Asthenes maculicauda
- Puna canastero, Asthenes sclateri
- Cordilleran canastero, Asthenes modesta
- Sharp-billed canastero, Asthenes pyrrholeuca
- Maquis canastero, Asthenes heterura
- Straight-billed reedhaunter, Limnoctites rectirostris
- Sulphur-bearded reedhaunter, Limnoctites sulphuriferus
- Stripe-crowned spinetail, Cranioleuca pyrrhophia
- Olive spinetail, Cranioleuca obsoleta
- Patagonian canastero, Pseudasthenes patagonica (E)
- Steinbach's canastero, Pseudasthenes steinbachi (E)
- Bay-capped wren-spinetail, Spartonoica maluroides
- Brown cacholote, Pseudoseisura lophotes
- White-throated cacholote, Pseudoseisura gutturalis (E)
- Yellow-chinned spinetail, Certhiaxis cinnamomeus
- Chotoy spinetail, Schoeniophylax phryganophilus
- Ochre-cheeked spinetail, Synallaxis scutata
- Gray-bellied spinetail, Synallaxis cinerascens
- Rufous-capped spinetail, Synallaxis ruficapilla
- Spix's spinetail, Synallaxis spixi
- Pale-breasted spinetail, Synallaxis albescens
- Sooty-fronted spinetail, Synallaxis frontalis
- Azara's spinetail, Synallaxis azarae

== Manakins ==
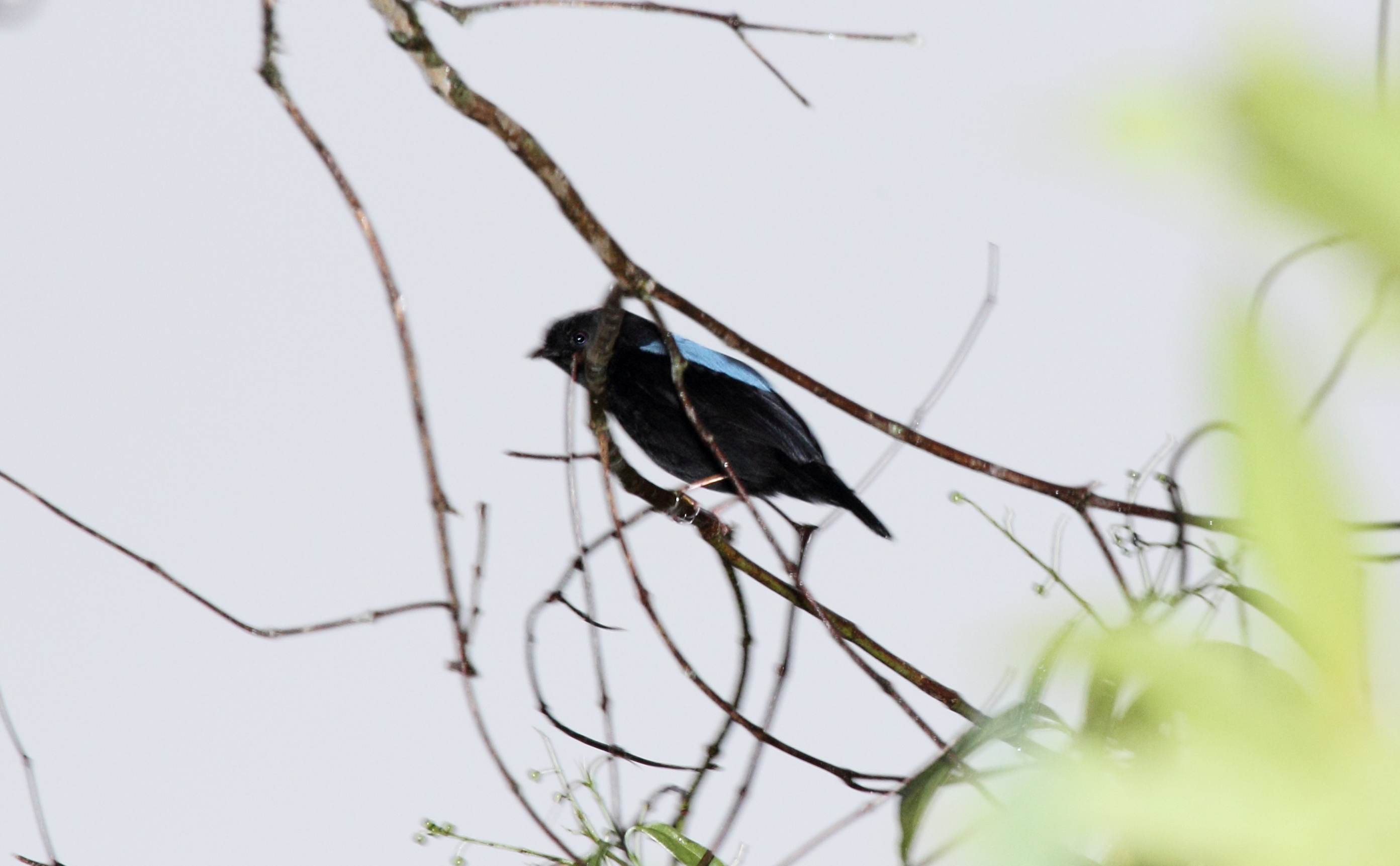
Yungas manakin

Order: Passeriformes Family: Pipridae

The manakins are a family of subtropical and tropical mainland Central and South America, and Trinidad and Tobago. They are compact forest birds, the males typically being brightly colored, although the females of most species are duller and usually green-plumaged. Manakins feed on small fruits, berries, and insects.

- Yungas manakin, Chiroxiphia boliviana
- Swallow-tailed manakin, Chiroxiphia caudata
- White-bearded manakin, Manacus manacus
- Band-tailed manakin, Pipra fasciicauda

== Cotingas ==
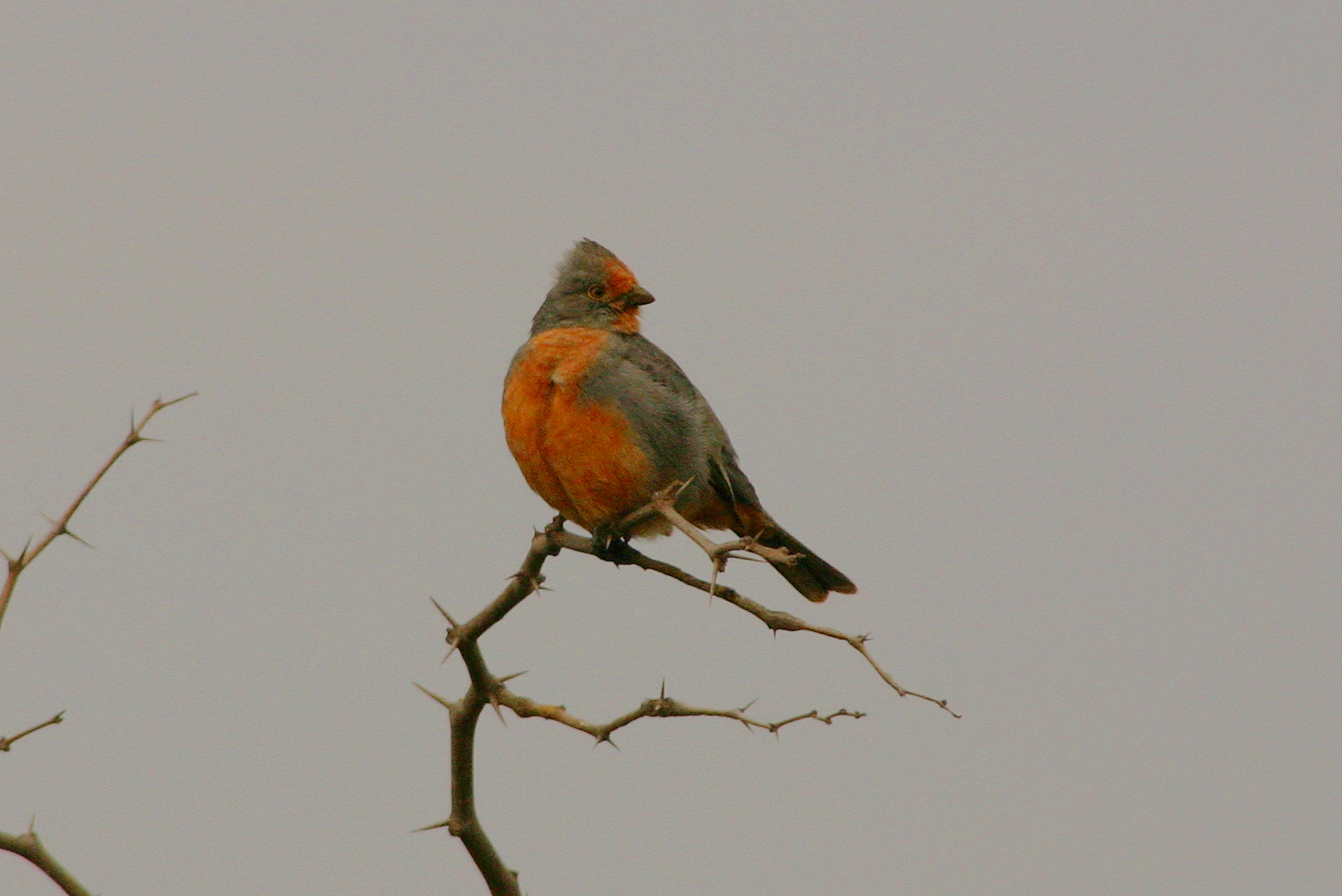
White-tipped plantcutter

Order: Passeriformes Family: Cotingidae

The cotingas are birds of forests or forest edges in tropical South America. Comparatively little is known about this diverse group, although all have broad bills with hooked tips, rounded wings, and strong legs. The males of many of the species are brightly colored or decorated with plumes or wattles.

- White-tipped plantcutter, Phytotoma rutila
- Rufous-tailed plantcutter, Phytotoma rara
- Swallow-tailed cotinga, Phibalura flavirostris
- Red-ruffed fruitcrow, Pyroderus scutatus
- Bare-throated bellbird, Procnias nudicollis

== Tityras ==
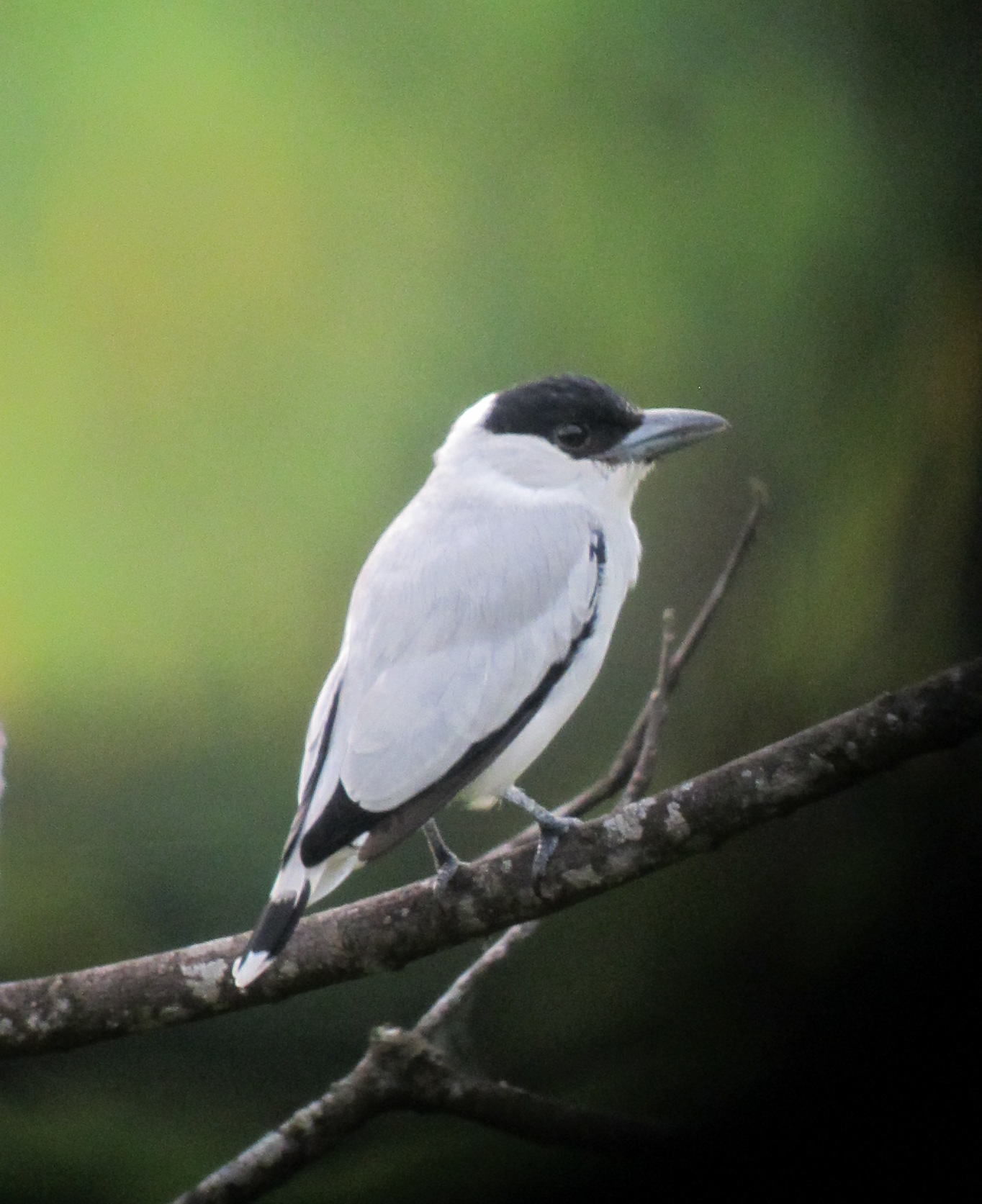
Black-crowned tityra

Order: Passeriformes Family: Tityridae

Tityridae are suboscine passerine birds found in forest and woodland in the Neotropics. The species in this family were formerly spread over the families Tyrannidae, Pipridae, and Cotingidae. They are small to medium-sized birds. They do not have the sophisticated vocal capabilities of the songbirds. Most, but not all, have plain coloring.

- Black-crowned tityra, Tityra inquisitor
- Black-tailed tityra, Tityra cayana
- Masked tityra, Tityra semifasciata
- Greenish schiffornis, Schiffornis virescens
- White-naped xenopsaris, Xenopsaris albinucha
- Green-backed becard, Pachyramphus viridis
- Chestnut-crowned becard, Pachyramphus castaneus
- White-winged becard, Pachyramphus polychopterus
- Crested becard, Pachyramphus validus

== Sharpbill ==
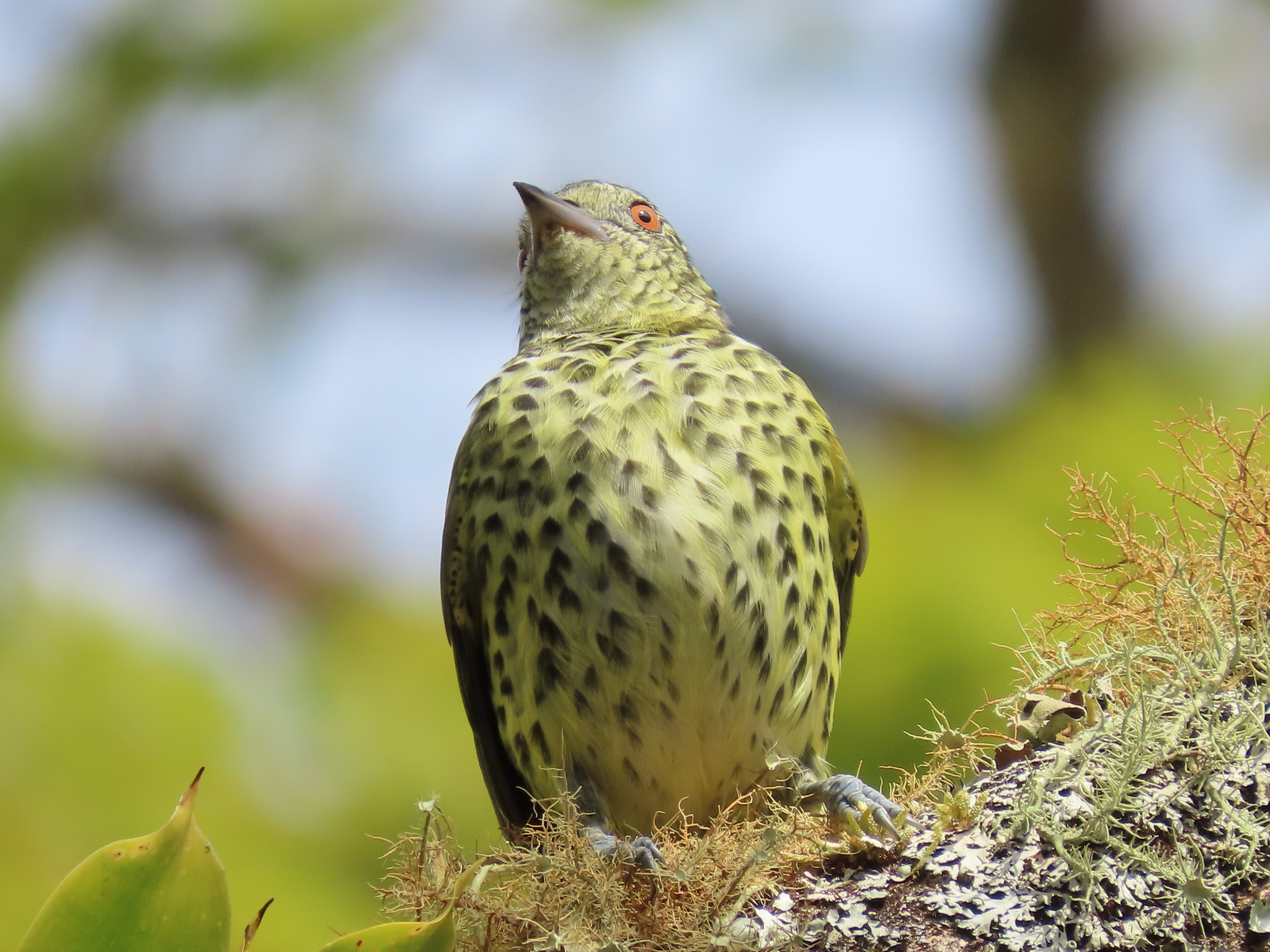
Sharpbill

Order: Passeriformes Family: Oxyruncidae

The sharpbill is a small bird of dense forests in Central and South America. It feeds mostly on fruit but also eats insects.

- Sharpbill, Oxyruncus cristatus

== Tyrant flycatchers ==
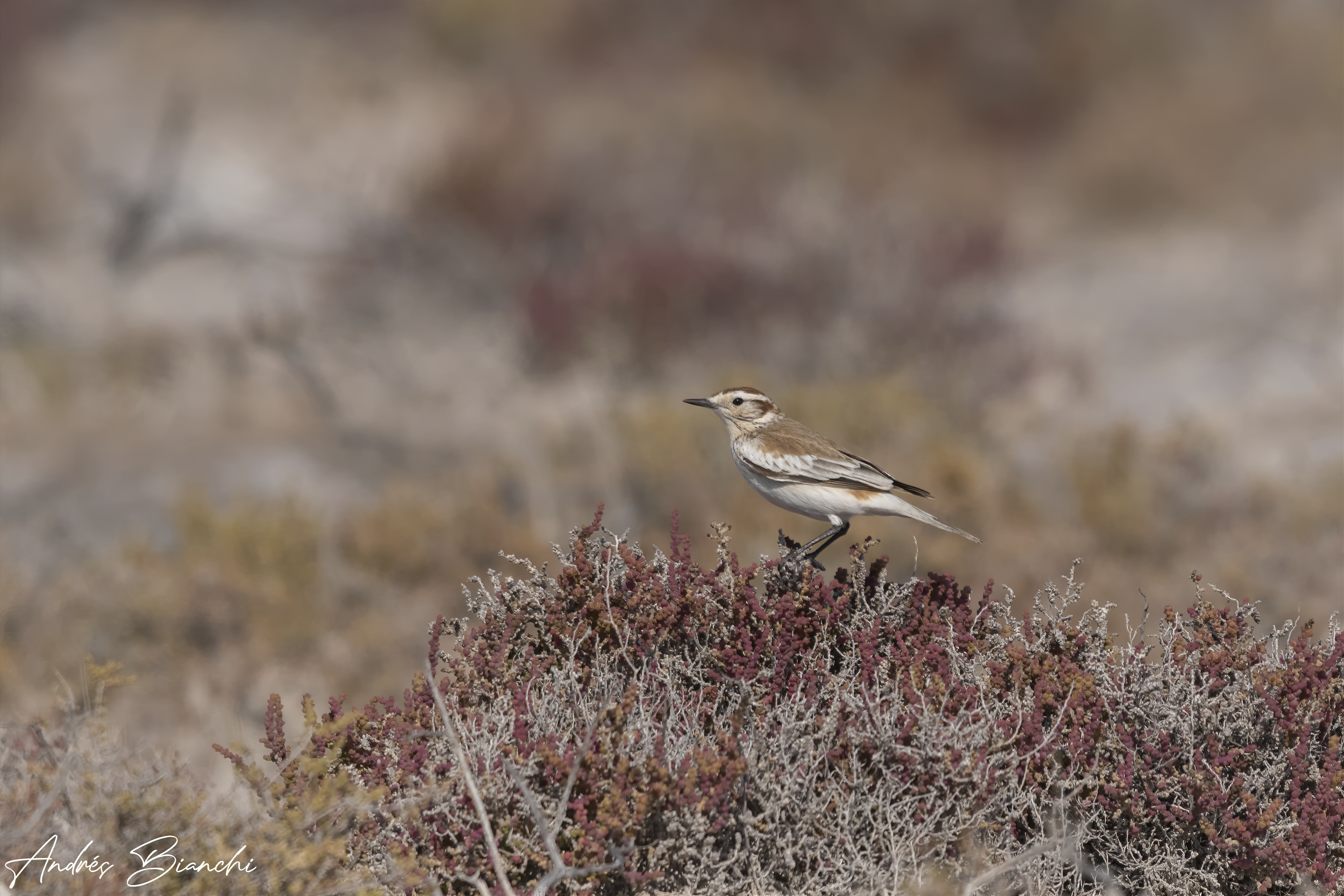
Salinas monjita

Order: Passeriformes Family: Tyrannidae

Tyrant flycatchers are passerine birds which occur throughout North and South America. They superficially resemble the Old World flycatchers, but are more robust and have stronger bills. They do not have the sophisticated vocal capabilities of the songbirds. Most, but not all, have plain coloring. As the name implies, most are insectivorous.

- Wing-barred piprites, Piprites chloris
- Black-capped piprites, Piprites pileata
- White-throated spadebill, Platyrinchus mystaceus
- Russet-winged spadebill, Platyrinchus leucoryphus (U)
- Southern antpipit, Corythopis delalandi
- Southern bristle-tyrant, Pogonotriccus eximius
- São Paulo bristle-tyrant, Pogonotriccus paulista
- Mottle-cheeked tyrannulet, Phylloscartes ventralis
- Bay-ringed tyrannulet, Phylloscartes sylviolus
- Gray-hooded flycatcher, Mionectes rufiventris
- Sepia-capped flycatcher, Leptopogon amaurocephalus
- Yellow-olive flatbill, Tolmomyias sulphurescens
- Eared pygmy-tyrant, Myiornis auricularis
- Drab-breasted pygmy-tyrant, Hemitriccus diops
- Brown-breasted pygmy-tyrant, Hemitriccus obsoletus
- Pearly-vented tody-tyrant, Hemitriccus margaritaceiventer
- Ochre-faced tody-flycatcher, Poecilotriccus plumbeiceps
- Common tody-flycatcher, Todirostrum cinereum
- Cliff flycatcher, Hirundinea ferruginea
- Cinnamon flycatcher, Pyrrhomyias cinnamomeus
- Greater wagtail-tyrant, Stigmatura budytoides
- Plain tyrannulet, Inezia inornata
- Fulvous-crowned scrub-tyrant, Euscarthmus meloryphus
- Yellow-bellied elaenia, Elaenia flavogaster
- Large elaenia, Elaenia spectabilis
- White-crested elaenia, Elaenia albiceps
- Small-billed elaenia, Elaenia parvirostris
- Olivaceous elaenia, Elaenia mesoleuca
- Slaty elaenia, Elaenia strepera
- Lesser elaenia, Elaenia chiriquensis
- Highland elaenia, Elaenia obscura
- Small-headed elaenia, Elaenia sordida
- Gray elaenia, Myiopagis caniceps
- Greenish elaenia, Myiopagis viridicata
- Suiriri flycatcher, Suiriri suiriri
- Yellow tyrannulet, Capsiempis flaveola
- Buff-banded tyrannulet, Mecocerculus hellmayri
- White-throated tyrannulet, Mecocerculus leucophrys
- Greenish tyrannulet, Phyllomyias virescens
- Sclater's tyrannulet, Phyllomyias sclateri
- Planalto tyrannulet, Phyllomyias fasciatus
- Rough-legged tyrannulet, Acrochordopus burmeisteri
- Tawny-rumped tyrannulet, Tyranniscus uropygialis
- Southeastern beardless-tyrannulet, Camptostoma obsoletum
- Mouse-colored tyrannulet, Nesotriccus murinus (see note) (Note: The SACC has split Nesotriccus maranonicus from Nesotriccus murinus (Proposal 956) but has not assigned English names, so the proposal has not been implemented and the counts do not reflect the change.)
- Yellow-billed tit-tyrant, Anairetes flavirostris
- Tufted tit-tyrant, Anairetes parulus
- Bearded tachuri, Polystictus pectoralis
- Sharp-tailed tyrant, Culicivora caudacuta
- Crested doradito, Pseudocolopteryx sclateri
- Subtropical doradito, Pseudocolopteryx acutipennis
- Dinelli's doradito, Pseudocolopteryx dinelliana
- Warbling doradito, Pseudocolopteryx flaviventris
- Ticking doradito, Pseudocolopteryx citreola
- Sooty tyrannulet, Serpophaga nigricans
- White-crested tyrannulet, Serpophaga subcristata
- Straneck's tyrannulet, Serpophaga griseicapilla
- Rufous-tailed attila, Attila phoenicurus
- Piratic flycatcher, Legatus leucophaius
- Large-headed flatbill, Ramphotrigon megacephalum
- Great kiskadee, Pitangus sulphuratus
- Lesser kiskadee, Philohydor lictor (V)
- Cattle tyrant, Machetornis rixosa
- Boat-billed flycatcher, Megarynchus pitangua
- Golden-crowned flycatcher, Myiodynastes chrysocephalus
- Streaked flycatcher, Myiodynastes maculatus
- Rusty-margined flycatcher, Myiozetetes cayanensis (V)
- Social flycatcher, Myiozetetes similis
- Three-striped flycatcher, Conopias trivirgatus
- Variegated flycatcher, Empidonomus varius
- Crowned slaty flycatcher, Empidonomus aurantioatrocristatus
- White-throated kingbird, Tyrannus albogularis (U)
- Tropical kingbird, Tyrannus melancholicus
- Fork-tailed flycatcher, Tyrannus savana
- Eastern kingbird, Tyrannus tyrannus
- Rufous casiornis, Casiornis rufus
- Sibilant sirystes, Sirystes sibilator
- Dusky-capped flycatcher, Myiarchus tuberculifer
- Swainson's flycatcher, Myiarchus swainsoni
- Short-crested flycatcher, Myiarchus ferox
- Brown-crested flycatcher, Myiarchus tyrannulus
- Long-tailed tyrant, Colonia colonus
- Bran-colored flycatcher, Myiophobus fasciatus (see note) (Note: The SACC has split bran-colored flycatcher into three species (Proposal 963) but has not assigned English names, so the proposal has not been implemented and the counts do not reflect the change.)
- Patagonian tyrant, Colorhamphus parvirostris
- d'Orbigny's chat-tyrant, Ochthoeca oenanthoides
- White-browed chat-tyrant, Ochthoeca leucophrys
- Southern scrub-flycatcher, Sublegatus modestus
- Vermilion flycatcher, Pyrocephalus rubinus
- Black-backed water-tyrant, Fluvicola albiventer
- Masked water-tyrant, Fluvicola nengeta
- White-headed marsh tyrant, Arundinicola leucocephala
- Streamer-tailed tyrant, Gubernetes yetapa
- Black-and-white monjita, Heteroxolmis dominicana
- Cock-tailed tyrant, Alectrurus tricolor (Extirpated)
- Strange-tailed tyrant, Alectrurus risora
- Austral negrito, Lessonia rufa
- Andean negrito, Lessonia oreas
- Spectacled tyrant, Hymenops perspicillatus
- Plumbeous black-tyrant, Knipolegus cabanisi
- Blue-billed black-tyrant, Knipolegus cyanirostris
- Cinereous tyrant, Knipolegus striaticeps
- White-winged black-tyrant, Knipolegus aterrimus
- Hudson's black-tyrant, Knipolegus hudsoni
- Yellow-browed tyrant, Satrapa icterophrys
- Little ground-tyrant, Muscisaxicola fluviatilis (V)
- Spot-billed ground-tyrant, Muscisaxicola maculirostris
- Puna ground-tyrant, Muscisaxicola juninensis
- Cinereous ground-tyrant, Muscisaxicola cinereus
- Ochre-naped ground-tyrant, Muscisaxicola flavinucha
- Rufous-naped ground-tyrant, Muscisaxicola rufivertex
- Dark-faced ground-tyrant, Muscisaxicola maclovianus
- White-browed ground-tyrant, Muscisaxicola albilora
- Cinnamon-bellied ground-tyrant, Muscisaxicola capistratus
- Black-fronted ground-tyrant, Muscisaxicola frontalis
- Rufous-webbed bush-tyrant, Cnemarchus rufipennis
- White-rumped monjita, Xolmis velatus (V)
- White monjita, Xolmis irupero
- Fire-eyed diucon, Pyrope pyrope
- Gray monjita, Nengetus cinereus
- Black-crowned monjita, Neoxolmis coronatus
- Chocolate-vented tyrant, Neoxolmis rufiventris
- Salinas monjita, Neoxolmis salinarum (E)
- Rusty-backed monjita, Neoxolmis rubetra (E)
- Black-billed shrike-tyrant, Agriornis montanus
- White-tailed shrike-tyrant, Agriornis albicauda
- Great shrike-tyrant, Agriornis lividus
- Gray-bellied shrike-tyrant, Agriornis micropterus
- Lesser shrike-tyrant, Agriornis murinus
- Streak-throated bush-tyrant, Myiotheretes striaticollis
- Fuscous flycatcher, Cnemotriccus fuscatus
- Euler's flycatcher, Lathrotriccus euleri
- Black phoebe, Sayornis nigricans
- Alder flycatcher, Empidonax alnorum
- Olive-sided flycatcher, Contopus cooperi (V)
- Smoke-colored pewee, Contopus fumigatus
- Eastern wood-pewee, Contopus virens (V)
- Tropical pewee, Contopus cinereus
- Shear-tailed gray tyrant, Muscipipra vetula
- Many-colored rush tyrant, Tachuris rubrigastra

== Vireos ==
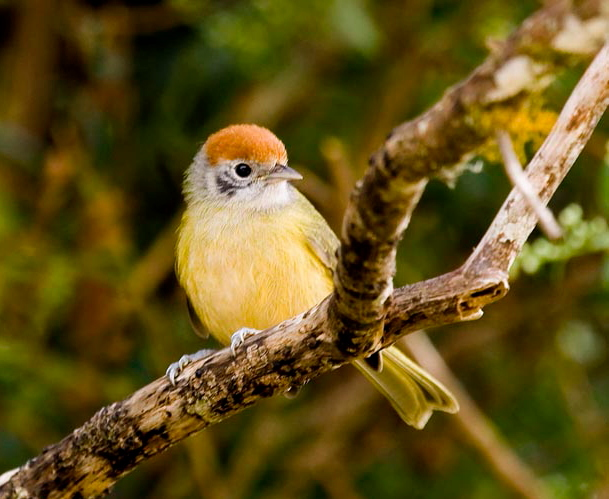
Rufous-crowned greenlet

Order: Passeriformes Family: Vireonidae

The vireos are a group of small to medium-sized passerine birds. They are typically greenish in color and resemble wood warblers apart from their heavier bills.

- Rufous-browed peppershrike, Cyclarhis gujanensis
- Rufous-crowned greenlet, Hylophilus poicilotis
- Chivi vireo, Vireo chivi

== Jays ==
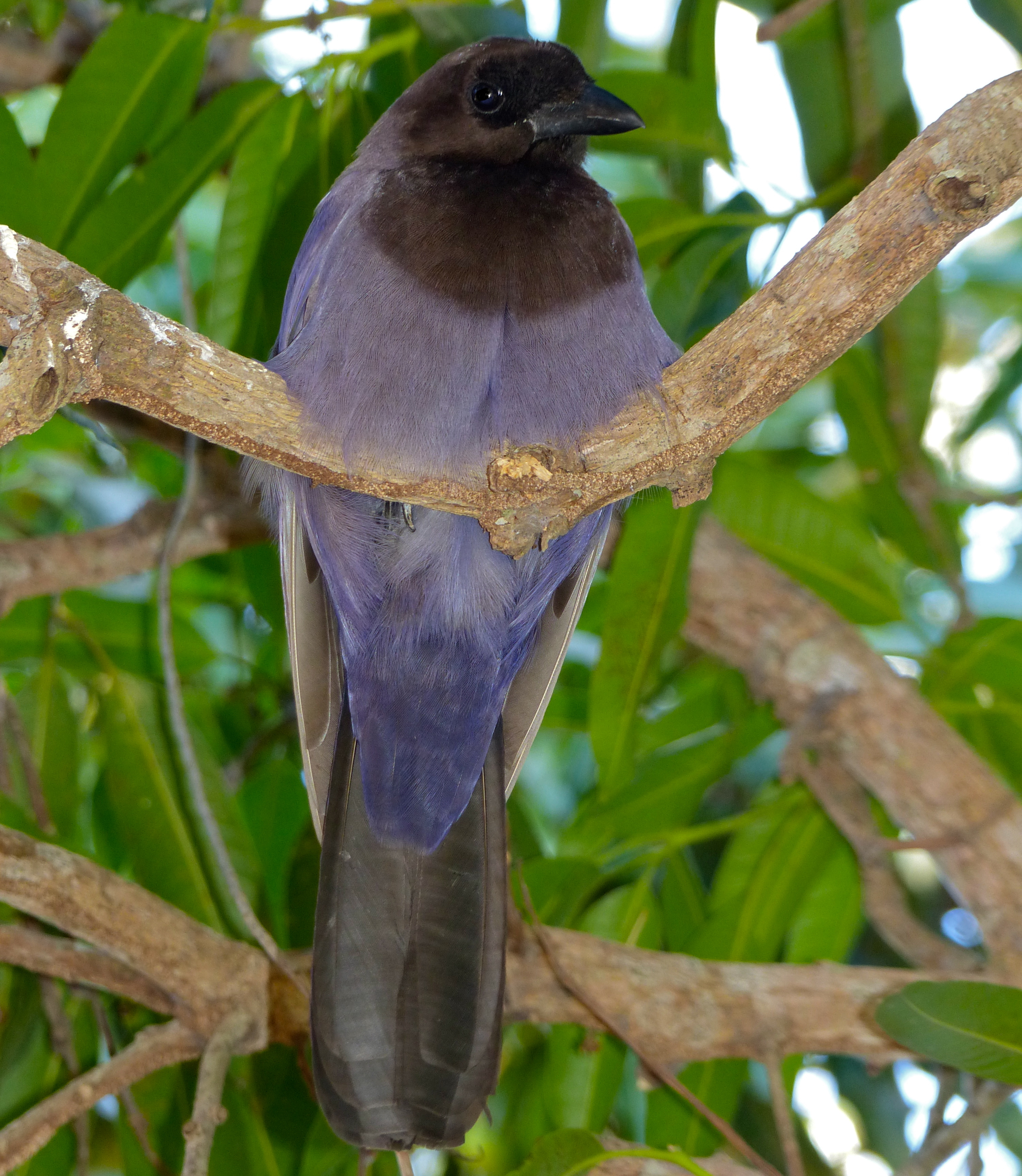
Purplish jay

Order: Passeriformes Family: Corvidae

The family Corvidae includes crows, ravens, jays, choughs, magpies, treepies, nutcrackers and ground jays. Corvids are above average in size among the Passeriformes, and some of the larger species show high levels of intelligence.

- Purplish jay, Cyanocorax cyanomelas
- Azure jay, Cyanocorax caeruleus
- Plush-crested jay, Cyanocorax chrysops

== Swallows ==
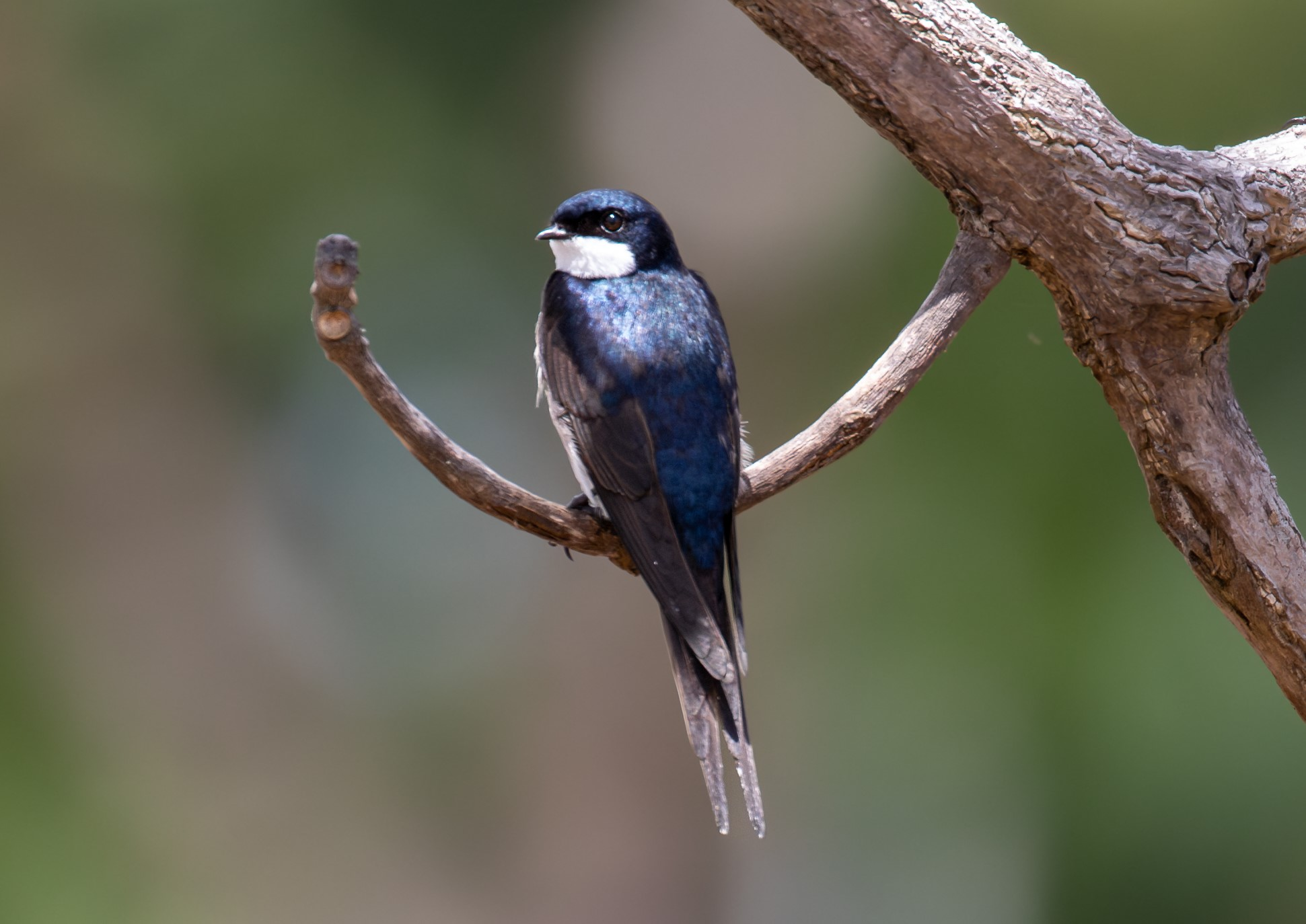
Black-collared swallow

Order: Passeriformes Family: Hirundinidae

The family Hirundinidae is adapted to aerial feeding. They have a slender streamlined body, long pointed wings, and a short bill with a wide gape. The feet are adapted to perching rather than walking, and the front toes are partially joined at the base.

- Blue-and-white swallow, Pygochelidon cyanoleuca
- Black-collared swallow, Pygochelidon melanoleuca
- Tawny-headed swallow, Alopochelidon fucata
- Andean swallow, Orochelidon andecola
- Southern rough-winged swallow, Stelgidopteryx ruficollis
- Brown-chested martin, Progne tapera
- Purple martin, Progne subis (V)
- Gray-breasted martin, Progne chalybea
- Southern martin, Progne elegans
- White-winged swallow, Tachycineta albiventer
- White-rumped swallow, Tachycineta leucorrhoa
- Chilean swallow, Tachycineta leucopyga
- Bank swallow, Riparia riparia
- Barn swallow, Hirundo rustica
- Cliff swallow, Petrochelidon pyrrhonota

== Wrens ==
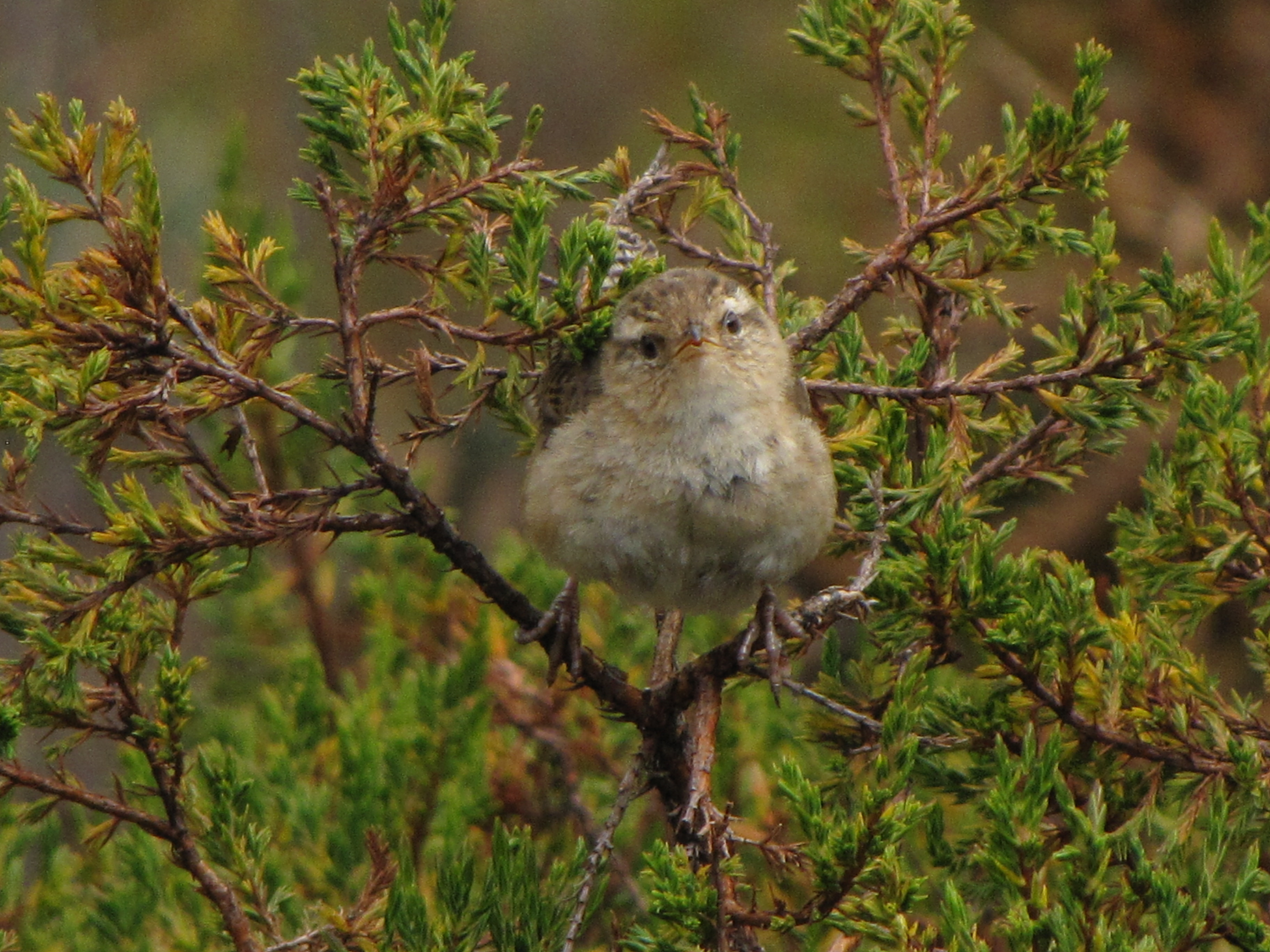
Grass wren

Order: Passeriformes Family: Troglodytidae

The wrens are mainly small and inconspicuous except for their loud songs. These birds have short wings and thin down-turned bills. Several species often hold their tails upright. All are insectivorous.

- Southern house-wren, Troglodytes musculus
- Mountain wren, Troglodytes solstitialis
- Grass wren, Cistothorus platensis
- Thrush-like wren, Campylorhynchus turdinus

== Gnatcatchers ==
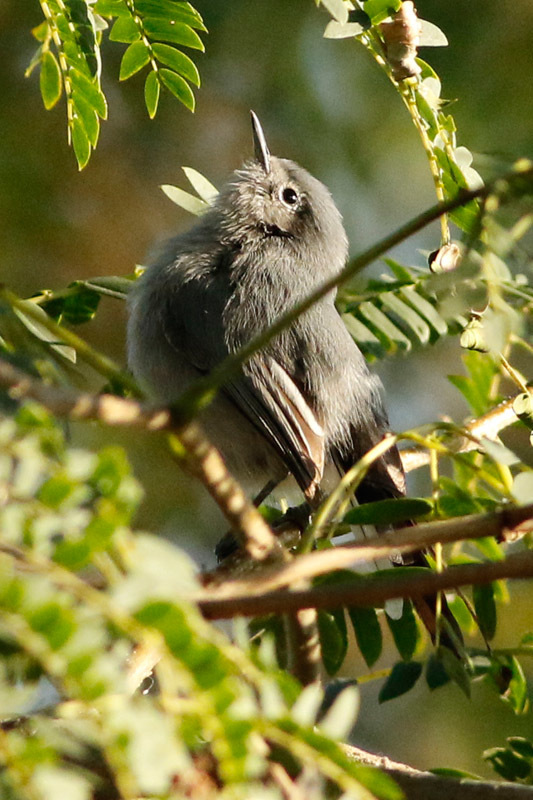
Masked gnatcatcher

Order: Passeriformes Family: Polioptilidae

These dainty birds resemble Old World warblers in their build and habits, moving restlessly through the foliage seeking insects. The gnatcatchers and gnatwrens are mainly soft bluish gray in color and have the typical insectivore's long sharp bill. They are birds of fairly open woodland or scrub, which nest in bushes or trees.

- Creamy-bellied gnatcatcher, Polioptila lactea
- Masked gnatcatcher, Polioptila dumicola

== Donacobius ==
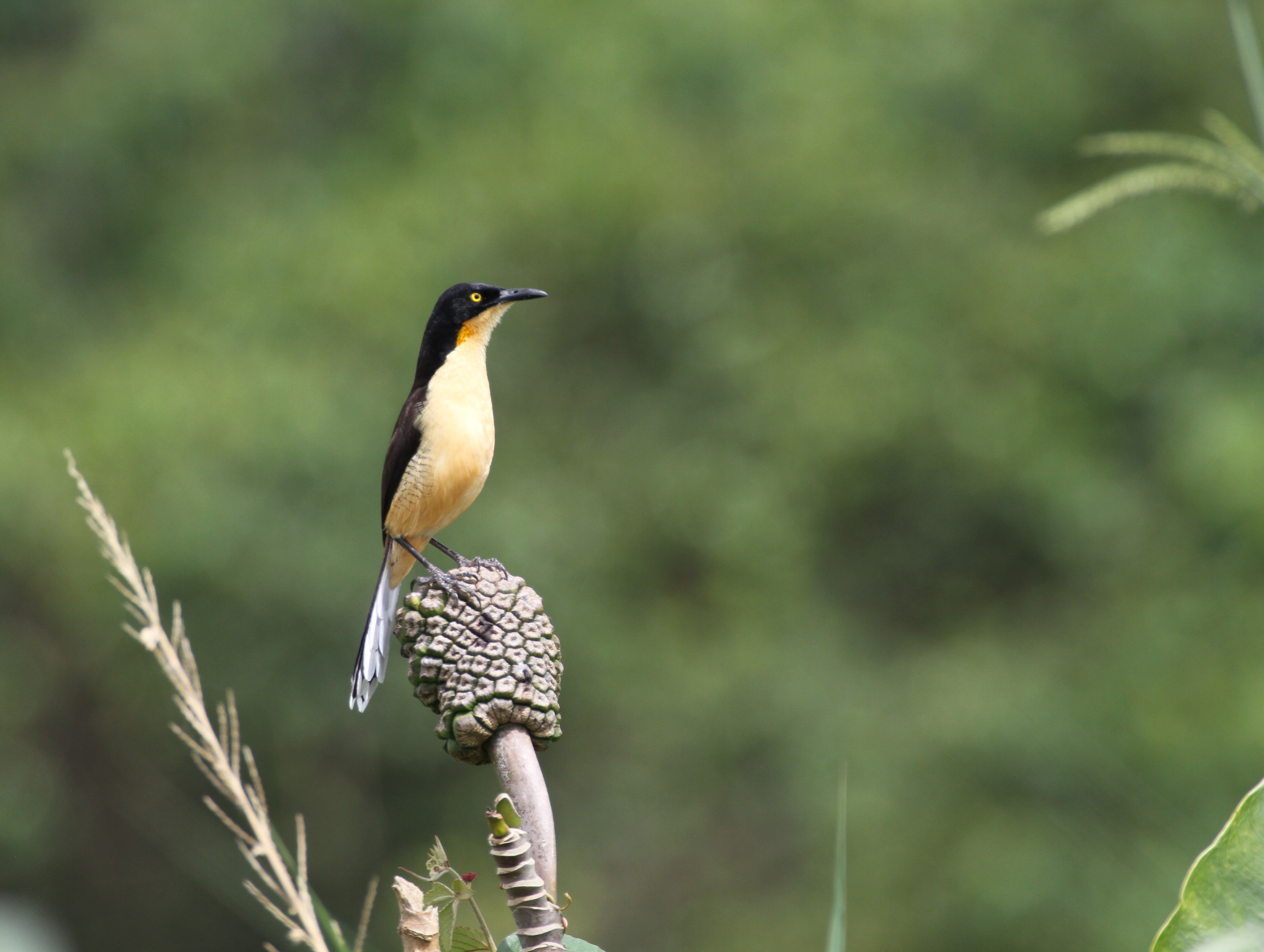
Black-capped donacobius

Order: Passeriformes Family: Donacobiidae

The black-capped donacobius is found in wet habitats from Panama across northern South America and east of the Andes to Argentina and Paraguay.

- Black-capped donacobius, Donacobius atricapilla

== Dippers ==
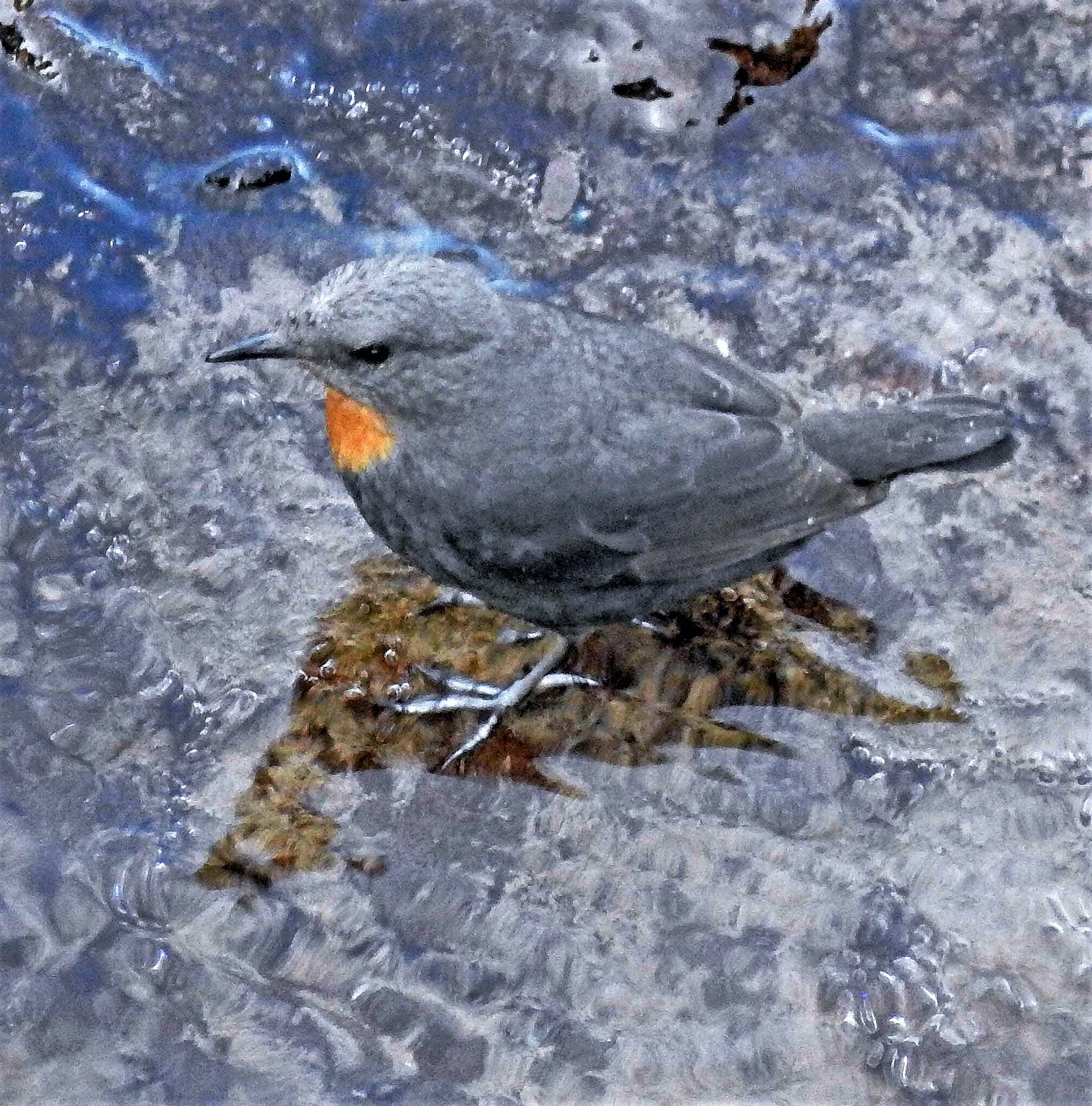
Rufous-throated dipper

Order: Passeriformes Family: Cinclidae

Dippers are a group of perching birds whose habitat includes aquatic environments in the Americas, Europe, and Asia. They are named for their bobbing or dipping movements.

- Rufous-throated dipper, Cinclus schulzii

== Thrushes ==
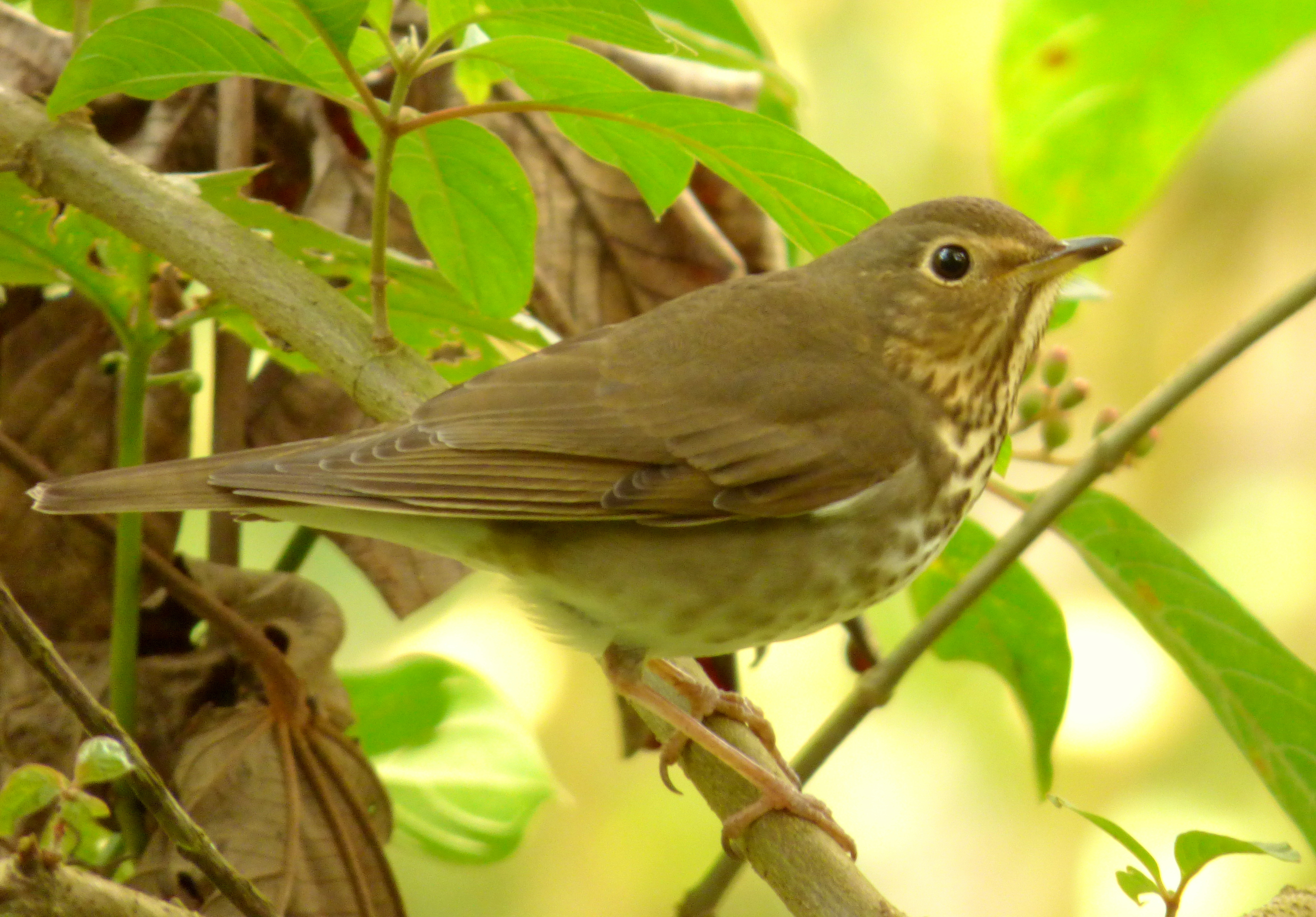
Swainson's thrush

Order: Passeriformes Family: Turdidae

The thrushes are a group of passerine birds that occur mainly in the Old World. They are plump, soft plumaged, small to medium-sized insectivores or sometimes omnivores, often feeding on the ground. Many have attractive songs.

- Speckled nightingale-thrush, Catharus maculatus
- Veery, Catharus fuscescens (V)
- Swainson's thrush, Catharus ustulatus
- Austral thrush, Turdus falcklandii
- Yellow-legged thrush, Turdus flavipes
- Pale-breasted thrush, Turdus leucomelas
- Cocoa thrush, Turdus fumigatus
- Rufous-bellied thrush, Turdus rufiventris
- Creamy-bellied thrush, Turdus amaurochalinus
- Andean slaty thrush, Turdus nigriceps
- Blacksmith thrush, Turdus subalaris
- Chiguanco thrush, Turdus chiguanco
- Glossy-black thrush, Turdus serranus
- Rufous-flanked thrush, Turdus albicollis

== Mockingbirds ==
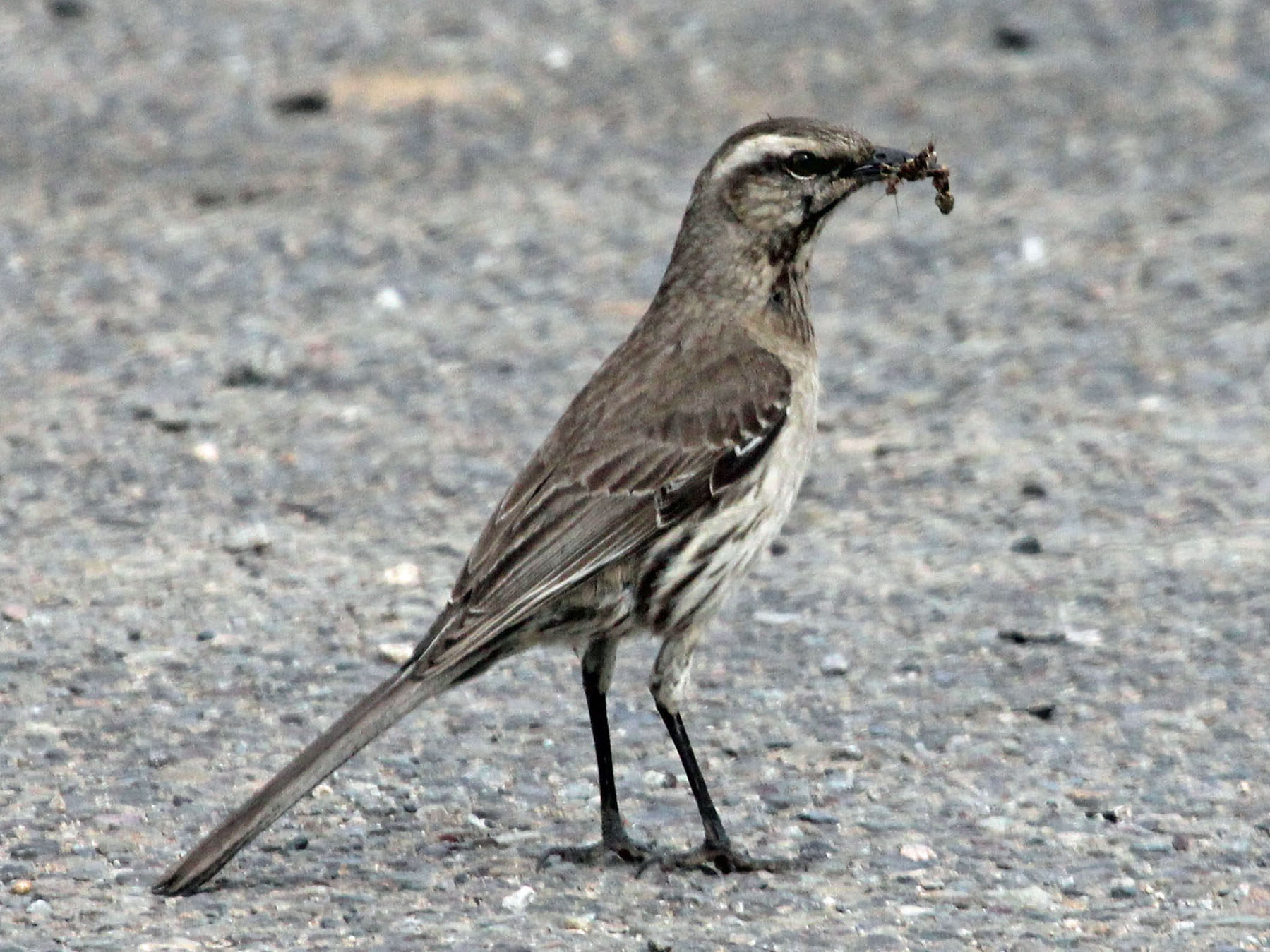
Chilean mockingbird

Order: Passeriformes Family: Mimidae

The mimids are a family of passerine birds that includes thrashers, mockingbirds, tremblers, and the New World catbirds. These birds are notable for their vocalizations, especially their ability to mimic a wide variety of birds and other sounds heard outdoors. Their coloring tends towards dull-grays and browns.

- Chilean mockingbird, Mimus thenca
- Patagonian mockingbird, Mimus patagonicus
- Chalk-browed mockingbird, Mimus saturninus
- White-banded mockingbird, Mimus triurus
- Brown-backed mockingbird, Mimus dorsalis

== Starlings ==
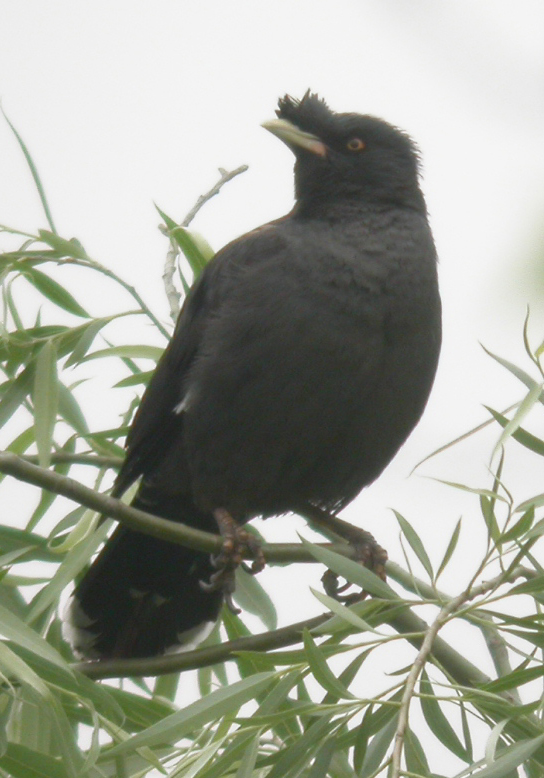
Crested myna

Order: Passeriformes Family: Sturnidae

Starlings are small to medium-sized passerine birds. Their flight is strong and direct and they are very gregarious. Their preferred habitat is fairly open country. They eat insects and fruit. Plumage is typically dark with a metallic sheen.

- Crested myna, Acridotheres cristatellus (I)
- European starling, Sturnus vulgaris (I)

== Old World sparrows ==
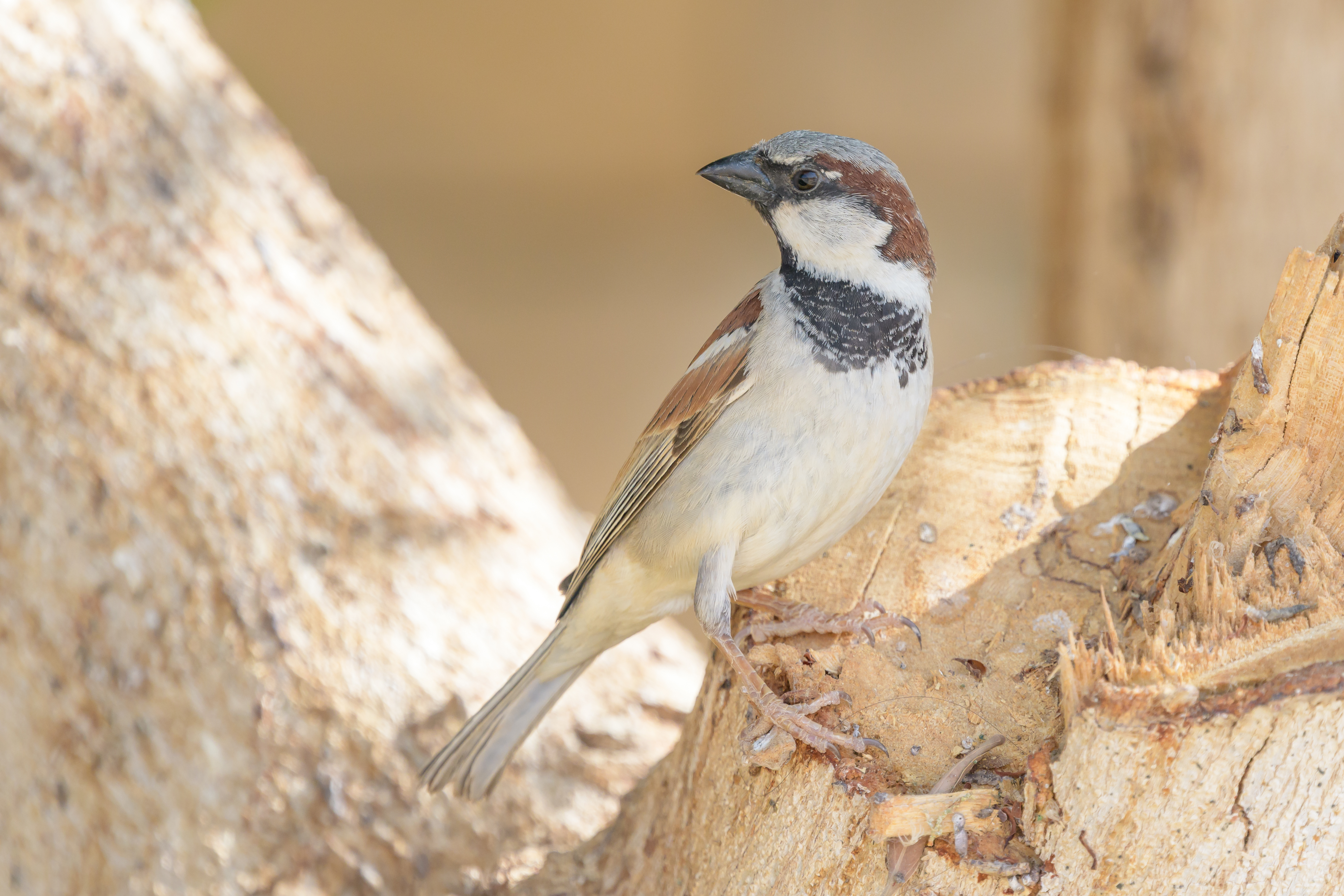
House sparrow

Order: Passeriformes Family: Passeridae

Sparrows are small passerine birds. In general, sparrows tend to be small, plump, brown or gray birds with short tails and short powerful beaks. Sparrows are seed eaters, but they also consume small insects.

- House sparrow, Passer domesticus (I)
- Italian sparrow, Passer italiae (UC)(I)

== Pipits and wagtails ==
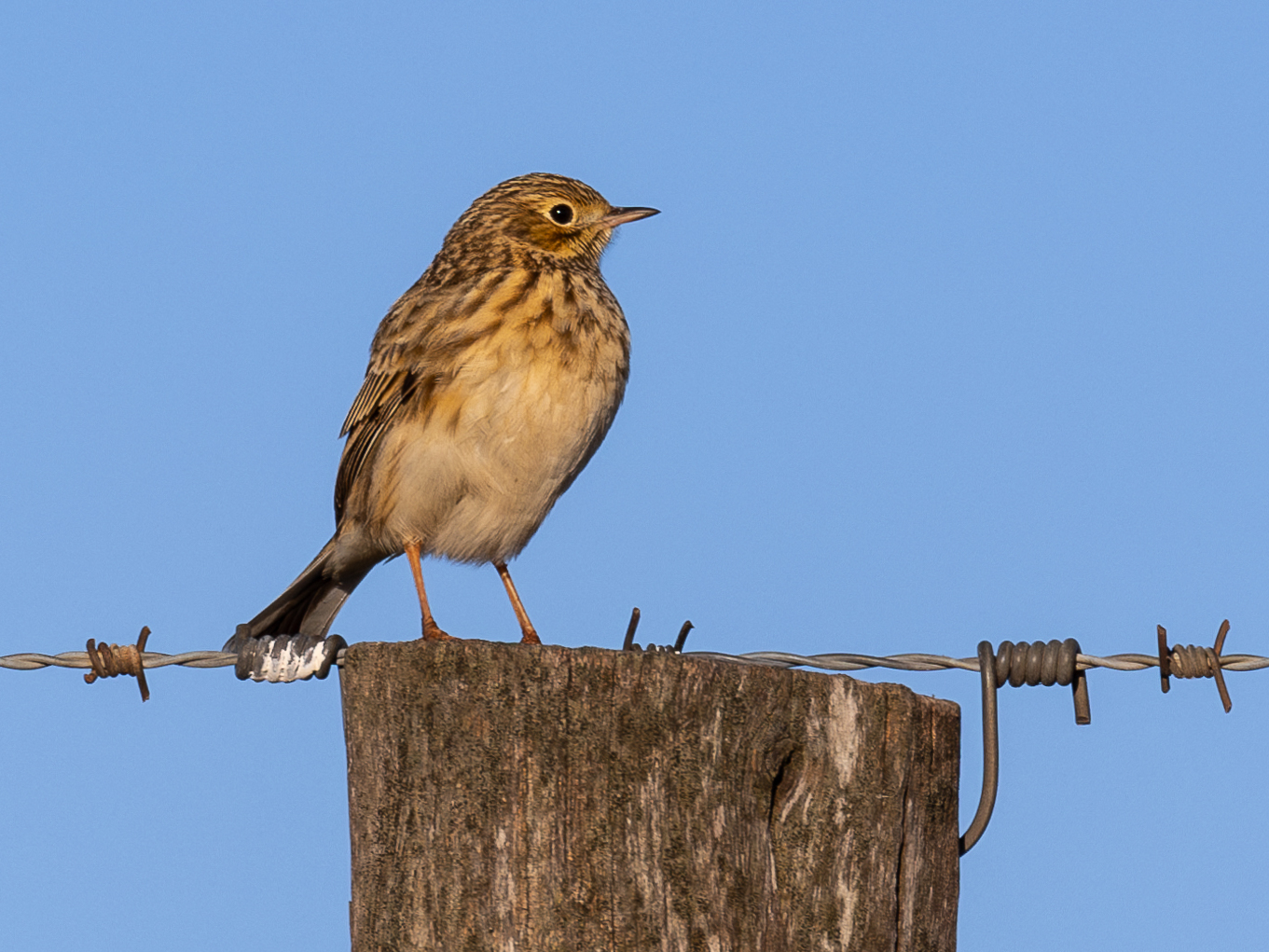
Pampas pipit

Order: Passeriformes Family: Motacillidae

Motacillidae is a family of small passerine birds with medium to long tails. They include the wagtails, longclaws, and pipits. They are slender ground feeding insectivores of open country.

- Yellowish pipit, Anthus chii
- Short-billed pipit, Anthus furcatus
- Pampas pipit, Anthus chacoensis
- Correndera pipit, Anthus correndera
- Ochre-breasted pipit, Anthus nattereri
- Hellmayr's pipit, Anthus hellmayri
- Paramo pipit, Anthus bogotensis

== Finches ==
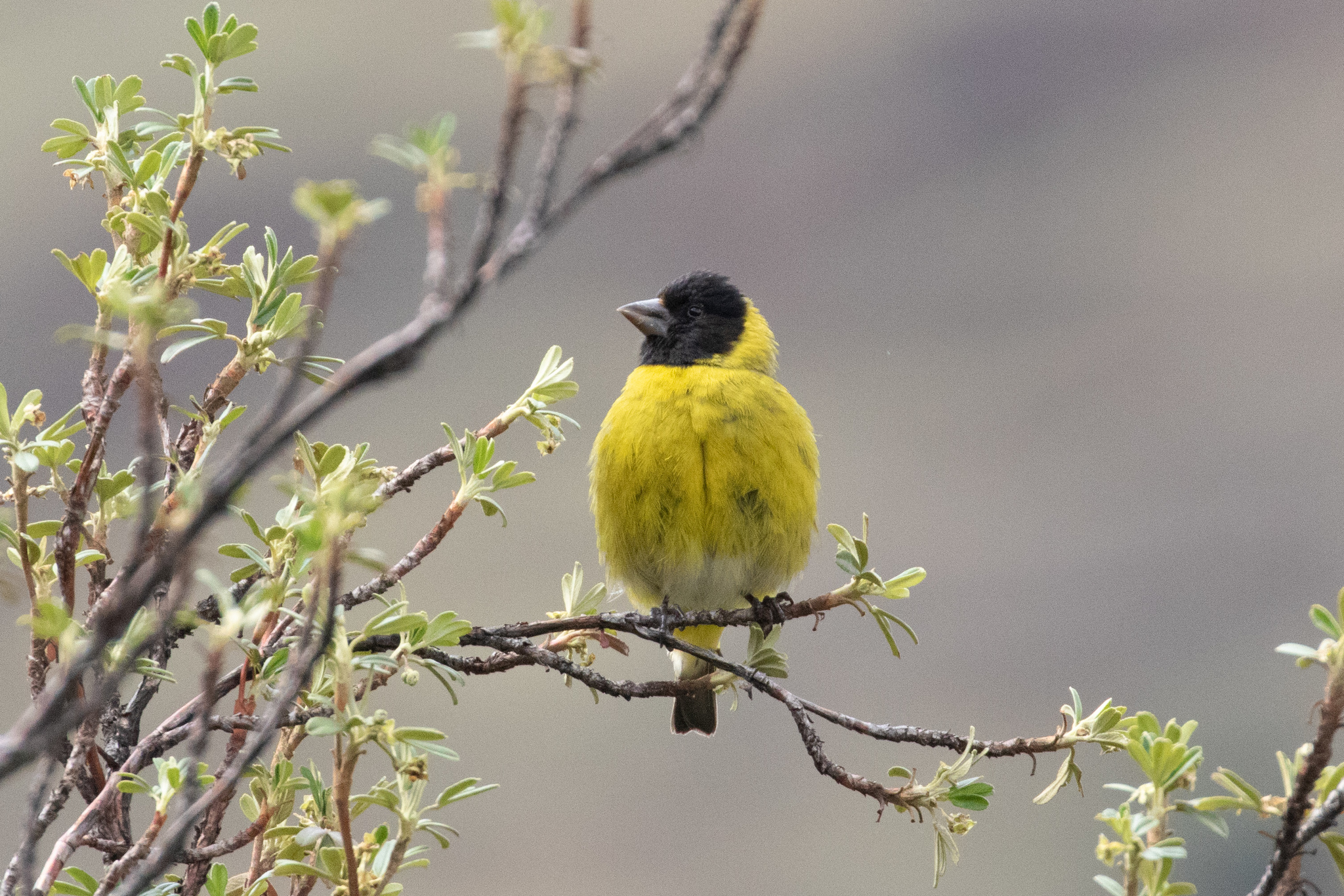
Thick-billed siskin

Order: Passeriformes Family: Fringillidae

Finches are seed-eating passerine birds, that are small to moderately large and have a strong beak, usually conical and in some species very large. All have twelve tail feathers and nine primaries. These birds have a bouncing flight with alternating bouts of flapping and gliding on closed wings, and most sing well.

- European greenfinch, Chloris chloris (I)
- European goldfinch, Carduelis carduelis (I)
- Thick-billed siskin, Spinus crassirostris
- Hooded siskin, Spinus magellanicus
- Black siskin, Spinus atratus
- Yellow-rumped siskin, Spinus uropygialis
- Black-chinned siskin, Spinus barbatus
- Golden-rumped euphonia, Chlorophonia cyanocephala
- Blue-naped chlorophonia, Chlorophonia cyanea
- Purple-throated euphonia, Euphonia chlorotica
- Green-throated euphonia, Euphonia chalybea
- Violaceous euphonia, Euphonia violacea
- Chestnut-bellied euphonia, Euphonia pectoralis

== Sparrows ==
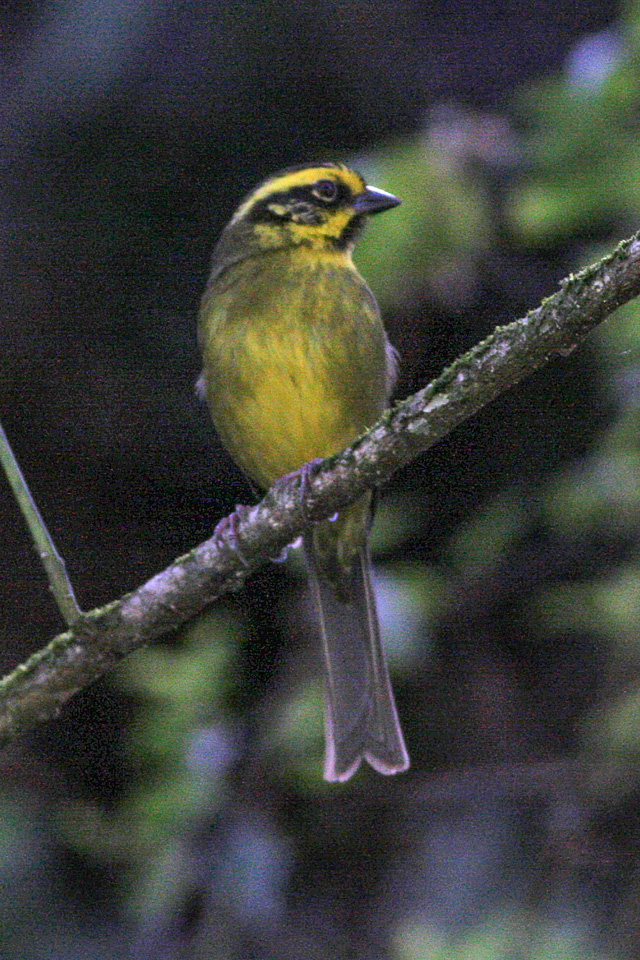
Yellow-striped brushfinch

Order: Passeriformes Family: Passerellidae

Most of the species are known as sparrows, but these birds are not closely related to the Old World sparrows which are in the family Passeridae. Many of these have distinctive head patterns.

- Common chlorospingus, Chlorospingus flavopectus
- Yungas sparrow, Rhynchospiza dabbennei (E)
- Chaco sparrow, Rhynchospiza strigiceps
- Grassland sparrow, Ammodramus humeralis
- Yellow-browed sparrow, Ammodramus aurifrons (U)
- White-browed brushfinch, Arremon torquatus
- Moss-backed sparrow, Arremon dorbignii
- Saffron-billed sparrow, Arremon flavirostris
- Rufous-collared sparrow, Zonotrichia capensis
- Fulvous-headed brushfinch, Atlapetes fulviceps
- Yellow-striped brushfinch, Atlapetes citrinellus (E)

== Blackbirds ==
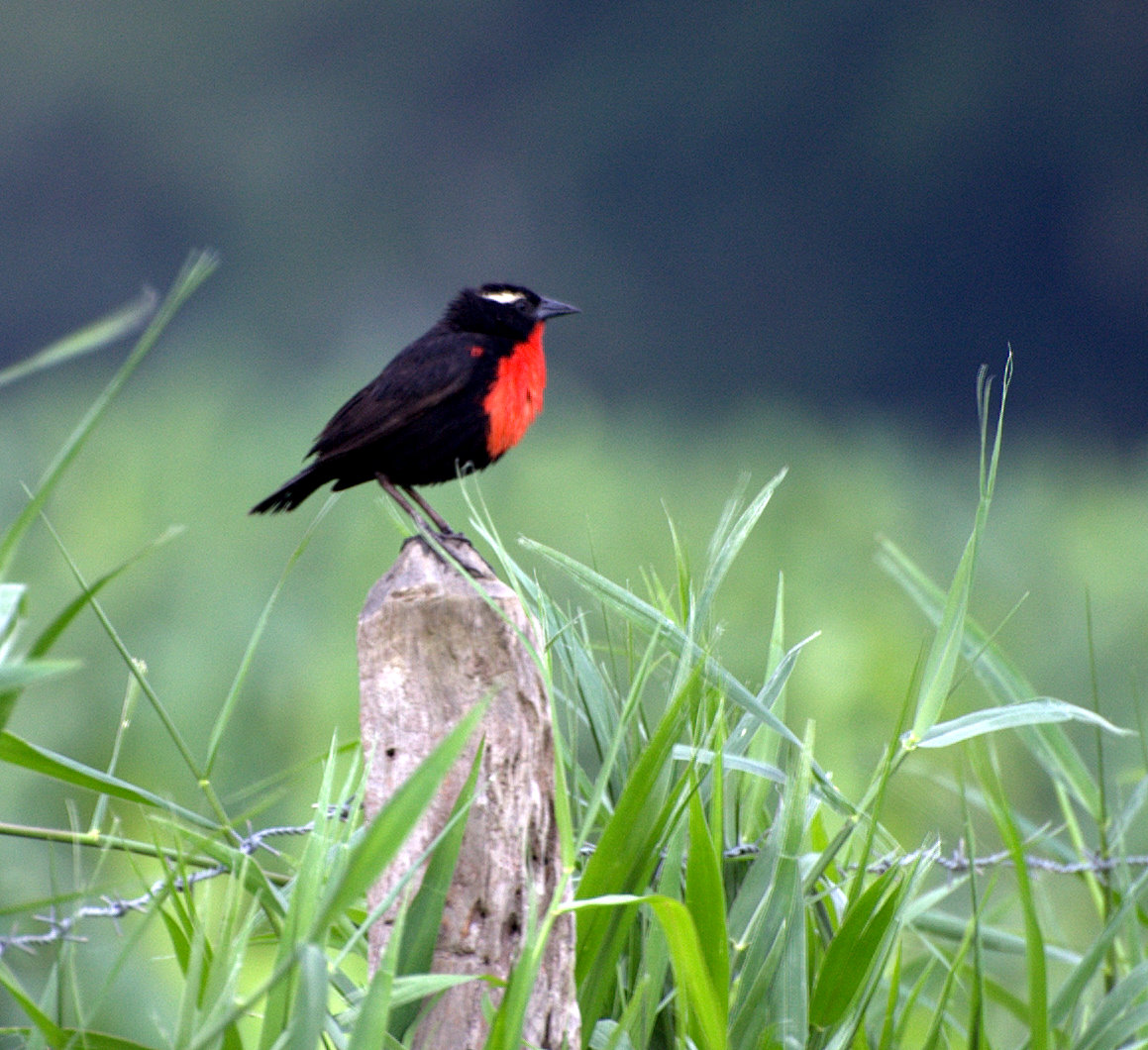
White-browed meadowlark

Order: Passeriformes Family: Icteridae

The icterids are a group of small to medium-sized, often colorful, passerine birds restricted to the New World and include the grackles, New World blackbirds, and New World orioles. Most species have black as the predominant plumage color, often enlivened by yellow, orange, or red.

- Bobolink, Dolichonyx oryzivorus
- White-browed meadowlark, Leistes superciliaris
- Pampas meadowlark, Leistes defilippii
- Long-tailed meadowlark, Leistes loyca
- Crested oropendola, Psarocolius decumanus
- Solitary black cacique, Cacicus solitarius
- Golden-winged cacique, Cacicus chrysopterus
- Red-rumped cacique, Cacicus haemorrhous
- Orange-backed troupial, Icterus croconotus
- Variable oriole, Icterus pyrrhopterus
- Screaming cowbird, Molothrus rufoaxillaris
- Giant cowbird, Molothrus oryzivorus
- Shiny cowbird, Molothrus bonariensis
- Scarlet-headed blackbird, Amblyramphus holosericeus
- Austral blackbird, Curaeus curaeus
- Chopi blackbird, Gnorimopsar chopi
- Grayish baywing, Agelaioides badius
- Unicolored blackbird, Agelasticus cyanopus
- Yellow-winged blackbird, Agelasticus thilius
- Chestnut-capped blackbird, Chrysomus ruficapillus
- Saffron-cowled blackbird, Xanthopsar flavus
- Yellow-rumped marshbird, Pseudoleistes guirahuro
- Brown-and-yellow marshbird, Pseudoleistes virescens

== Wood-warblers ==
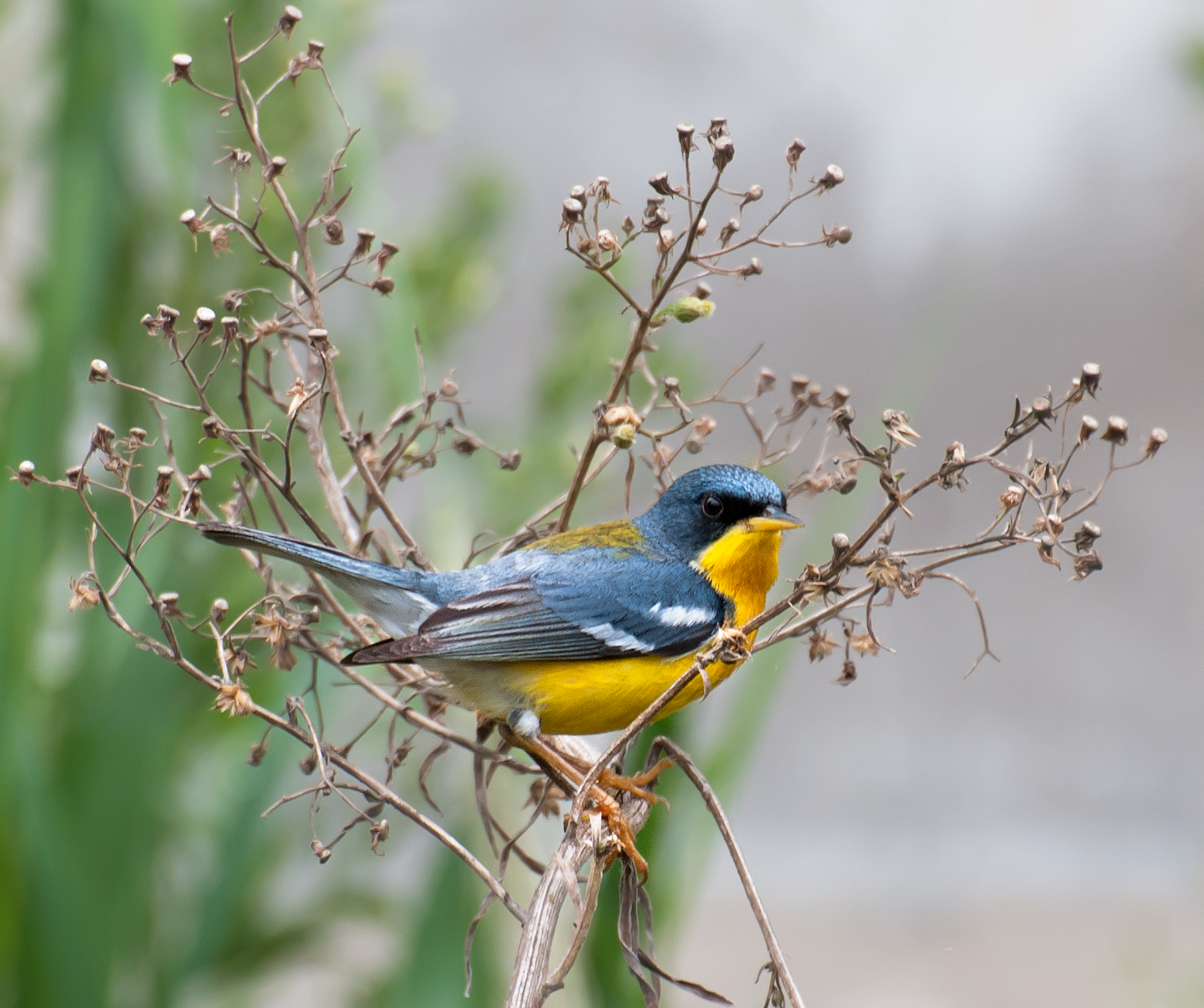
Tropical parula

Order: Passeriformes Family: Parulidae

The wood-warblers are a group of small, often colorful, passerine birds restricted to the New World. Most are arboreal, but some are terrestrial. Most members of this family are insectivores.

- Northern waterthrush, Parkesia noveboracensis (U)
- Tennessee warbler, Leiothlypis peregrina (U)
- Masked yellowthroat, Geothlypis aequinoctialis
- Common yellowthroat, Geothlypis trichas (V)
- American redstart, Setophaga ruticilla (U)
- Tropical parula, Setophaga pitiayumi
- Yellow warbler, Setophaga petechia (U)
- Blackpoll warbler, Setophaga striata (V)
- Flavescent warbler, Myiothlypis flaveola
- White-browed warbler, Myiothlypis leucoblephara
- Pale-legged warbler, Myiothlypis signata
- Riverbank warbler, Myiothlypis rivularis
- Two-banded warbler, Myiothlypis bivittata
- Golden-crowned warbler, Basileuterus culicivorus
- Wilson's warbler, Cardellina pusilla (U)
- Brown-capped whitestart, Myioborus brunniceps

== Cardinal grosbeaks ==
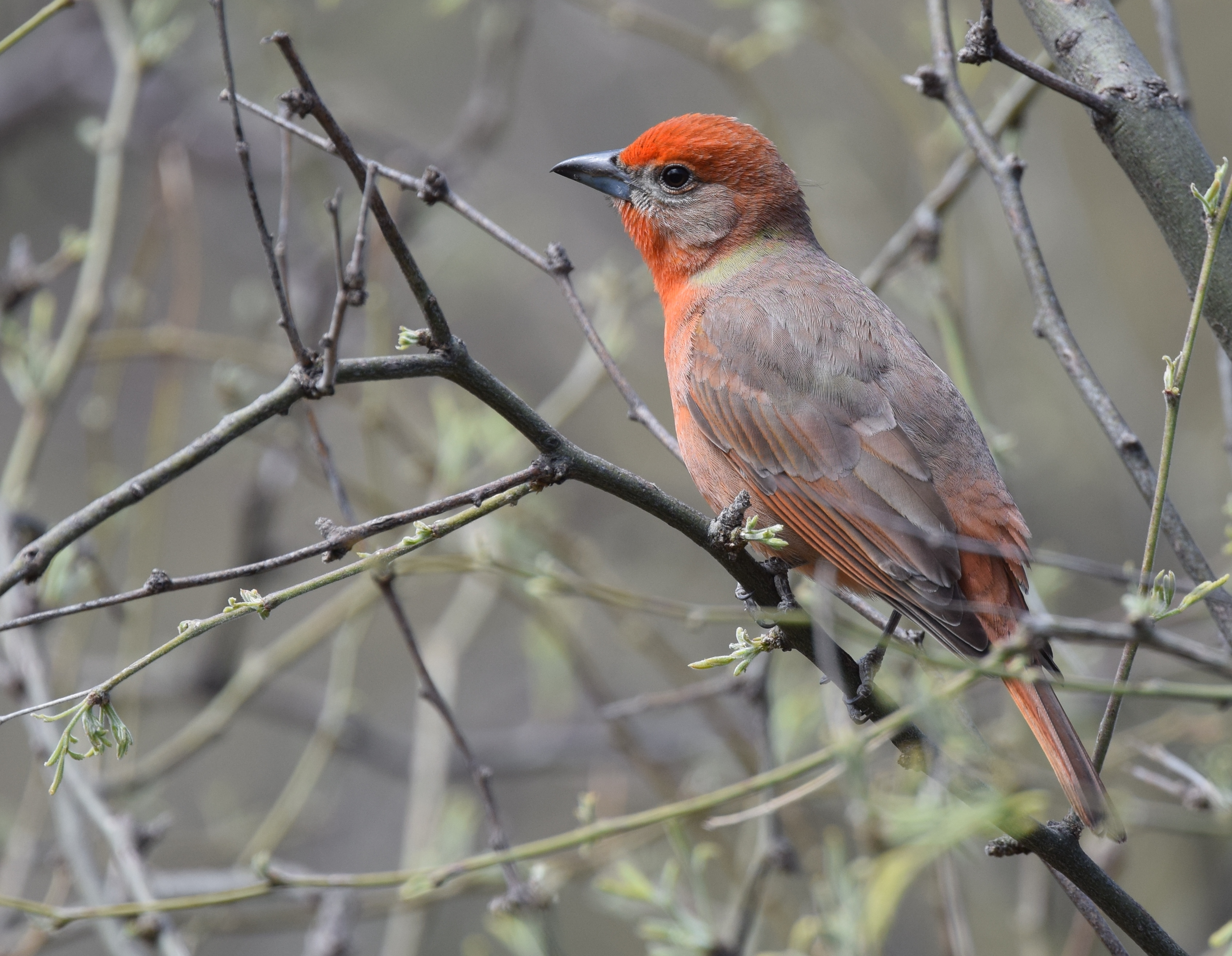
Hepatic tanager

Order: Passeriformes Family: Cardinalidae

The cardinals are a family of robust, seed-eating birds with strong bills. They are typically associated with open woodland. The sexes usually have distinct plumages.

- Hepatic tanager, Piranga flava
- Scarlet tanager, Piranga olivacea (V)
- Red-crowned ant-tanager, Habia rubica
- Black-backed grosbeak, Pheucticus aureoventris
- Blackish-blue seedeater, Amaurospiza moesta
- Glaucous-blue grosbeak, Cyanoloxia glaucocaerulea
- Ultramarine grosbeak, Cyanoloxia brissonii

== Tanagers ==
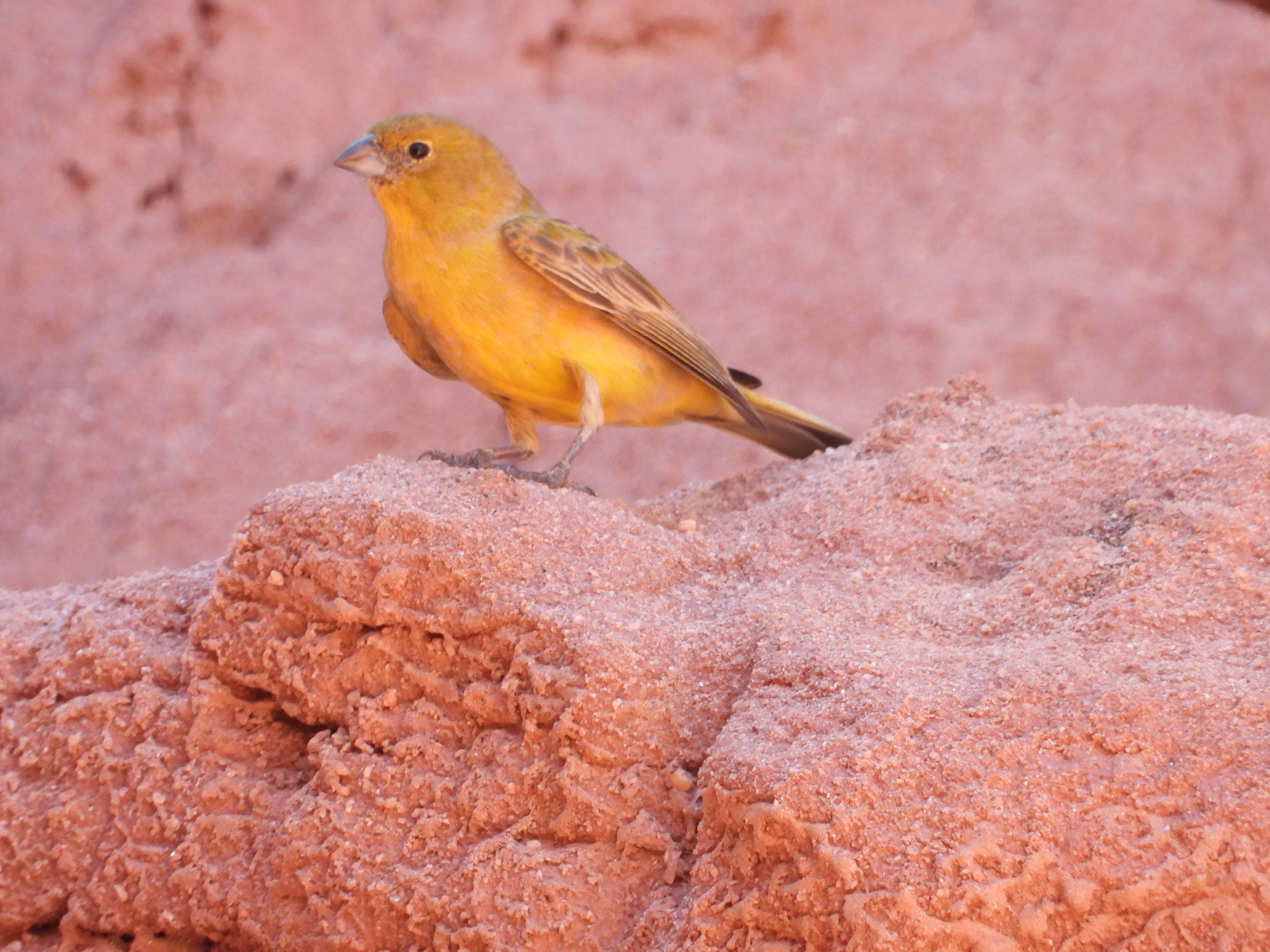
Monte yellow finch

Order: Passeriformes Family: Thraupidae

The tanagers are a large group of small to medium-sized passerine birds restricted to the New World, mainly in the tropics. Many species are brightly colored. As a family they are omnivorous, but individual species specialize in eating fruits, seeds, insects, or other types of food. Most have short, rounded wings.

- Hooded tanager, Nemosia pileata
- Plushcap, Catamblyrhynchus diadema
- Guira tanager, Hemithraupis guira
- Chestnut-vented conebill, Conirostrum speciosum
- Giant conebill, Conirostrum binghami (U)
- Stripe-tailed yellow-finch, Sicalis citrina
- Puna yellow-finch, Sicalis lutea
- Bright-rumped yellow-finch, Sicalis uropygialis
- Citron-headed yellow-finch, Sicalis luteocephala
- Greater yellow-finch, Sicalis auriventris
- Greenish yellow-finch, Sicalis olivascens
- Monte yellow-finch, Sicalis mendozae (E)
- Patagonian yellow-finch, Sicalis lebruni
- Saffron finch, Sicalis flaveola
- Grassland yellow-finch, Sicalis luteola
- Black-hooded sierra finch, Phrygilus atriceps
- Gray-hooded sierra finch, Phrygilus gayi
- Patagonian sierra finch, Phrygilus patagonicus
- Plumbeous sierra finch, Geospizopsis unicolor
- Ash-breasted sierra finch, Geospizopsis plebejus
- Mourning sierra finch, Rhopospina fruticeti
- Band-tailed sierra finch, Rhopospina alaudina
- Carbonated sierra finch, Rhopospina carbonaria (E)
- Red-backed sierra finch, Idiopsar dorsalis
- Glacier finch, Idiopsar speculifer (U)
- Boulder finch, Idiopsar brachyurus
- White-bridled finch, Melanodera melanodera
- Yellow-bridled finch, Melanodera xanthogramma
- Band-tailed seedeater, Catamenia analis
- Plain-colored seedeater, Catamenia inornata
- Gray-bellied flowerpiercer, Diglossa carbonaria (V)
- Rusty flowerpiercer, Diglossa sittoides
- Slaty finch, Haplospiza rustica (U)
- Uniform finch, Haplospiza unicolor
- Blue-black grassquit, Volatinia jacarina
- Ruby-crowned tanager, Tachyphonus coronatus
- White-lined tanager, Tachyphonus rufus
- Black-goggled tanager, Trichothraupis melanops
- Red-crested finch, Coryphospingus cucullatus
- Silver-beaked tanager, Ramphocelus carbo (V)
- Brazilian tanager, Ramphocelus bresilius (U)
- Coal-crested finch, Charitospiza eucosma (V)
- Red-legged honeycreeper, Cyanerpes cyaneus (V)
- Swallow tanager, Tersina viridis
- Blue dacnis, Dacnis cayana
- Lined seedeater, Sporophila lineola
- White-bellied seedeater, Sporophila leucoptera
- Pearly-bellied seedeater, Sporophila pileata
- Tawny-bellied seedeater, Sporophila hypoxantha
- Ibera seedeater, Sporophila iberaensis
- Dark-throated seedeater, Sporophila ruficollis
- Marsh seedeater, Sporophila palustris
- Rufous-rumped seedeater, Sporophila hypochroma
- Chestnut seedeater, Sporophila cinnamomea
- Black-bellied seedeater, Sporophila melanogaster (V)
- Chestnut-bellied seed-finch, Sporophila angolensis
- Yellow-bellied seedeater, Sporophila nigricollis (V)
- Double-collared seedeater, Sporophila caerulescens
- Temminck's seedeater, Sporophila falcirostris
- Buffy-fronted seedeater, Sporophila frontalis (U)
- Plumbeous seedeater, Sporophila plumbea (U)
- Rusty-collared seedeater, Sporophila collaris
- Many-colored chaco finch, Saltatricula multicolor
- Bluish-gray saltator, Saltator coerulescens
- Green-winged saltator, Saltator similis
- Thick-billed saltator, Saltator maxillosus
- Golden-billed saltator, Saltator aurantiirostris
- Black-throated grosbeak, Saltator fuliginosus
- Black-masked finch, Coryphaspiza melanotis
- Great Pampa-finch, Embernagra platensis
- Wedge-tailed grass-finch, Emberizoides herbicola
- Lesser grass-finch, Emberizoides ypiranganus
- Bolivian warbling finch, Poospiza boliviana
- Cinnamon warbling finch, Poospiza ornata (E)
- Black-and-chestnut warbling finch, Poospiza whitii
- Black-and-rufous warbling finch, Poospiza nigrorufa
- Tucuman mountain finch, Poospiza baeri (E)
- Rufous-sided warbling finch, Poospizopsis hypochondria
- Orange-headed tanager, Thlypopsis sordida
- Chestnut-headed tanager, Thlypopsis pyrrhocoma
- Rust-and-yellow tanager, Thlypopsis ruficeps
- Rusty-browed warbling finch, Microspingus erythrophrys
- Gray-throated warbling finch, Microspingus cabanisi
- Ringed warbling finch, Microspingus torquatus
- Black-capped warbling finch, Microspingus melanoleucus
- Long-tailed reed finch, Donacospiza albifrons
- Bananaquit, Coereba flaveola
- Dull-colored grassquit, Asemospiza obscura
- Sooty grassquit, Asemospiza fuliginosa
- Black-crested finch, Lophospingus pusillus
- Gray-crested finch, Lophospingus griseocristatus
- Diuca finch, Diuca diuca
- Yellow cardinal, Gubernatrix cristata
- Red-crested cardinal, Paroaria coronata
- Yellow-billed cardinal, Paroaria capitata
- Diademed tanager, Stephanophorus diadematus
- Cinnamon tanager, Schistochlamys ruficapillus (U)
- Magpie tanager, Cissopis leverianus
- Fawn-breasted tanager, Pipraeidea melanonota
- Blue-and-yellow tanager, Rauenia bonariensis
- Rufous-bellied mountain tanager, Pseudosaltator rufiventris
- Black-backed tanager, Stilpnia peruviana (U)
- Chestnut-backed tanager, Stilpnia preciosa
- Burnished-buff tanager, Stilpnia cayana
- Green-headed tanager, Tangara seledon
- Red-necked tanager, Tangara cyanocephala (U)
- Sayaca tanager, Thraupis sayaca
- Golden-chevroned tanager, Thraupis ornata (U)
- Palm tanager, Thraupis palmarum

== See also ==
- List of birds
- Lists of birds by region
