= Patagonian grasslands =

Ecoregion in the south of Argentina

Patagonian grasslands (NT0804)
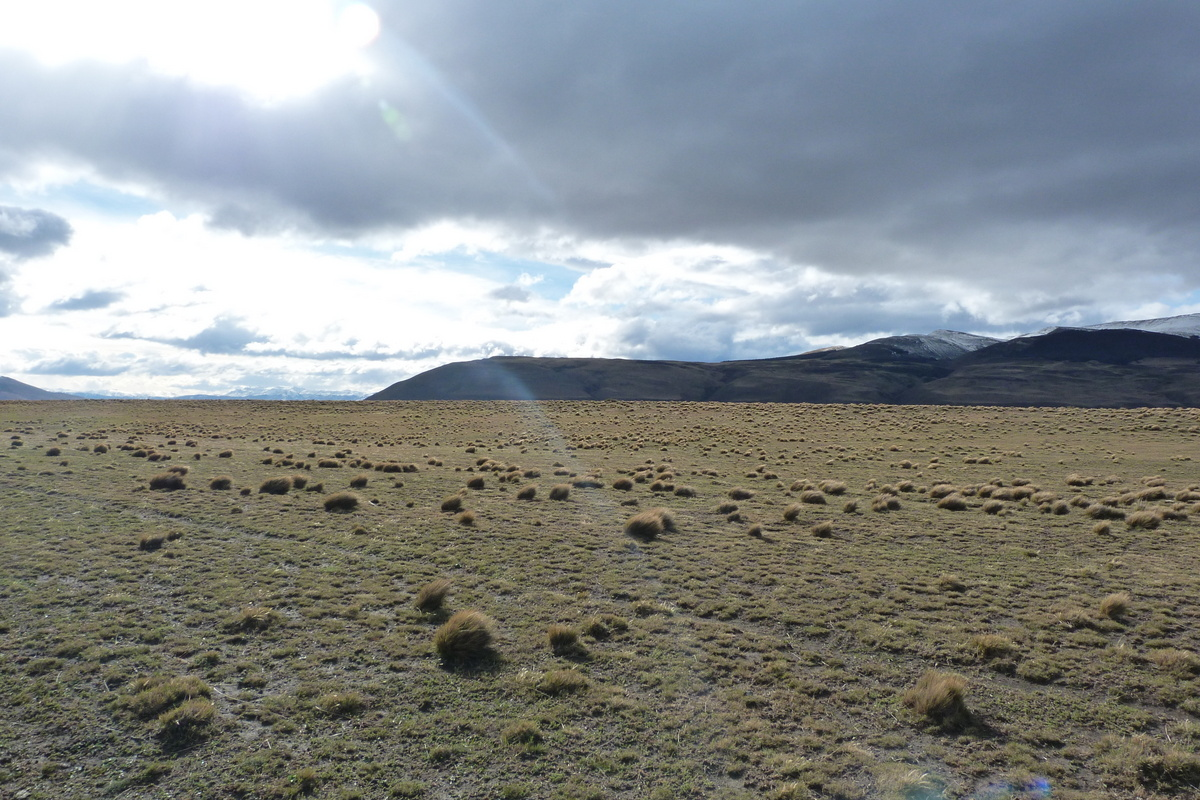
- Natural grasslands next to the road to Cerro Castillo.

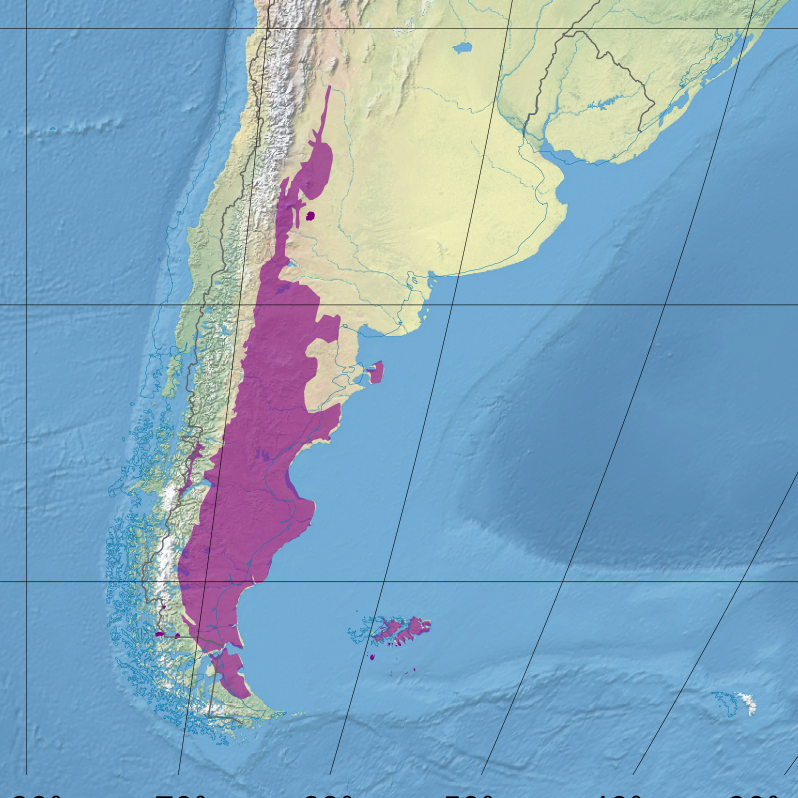
- Ecoregion territory (in purple)

Ecology
- Realm: Neotropical
- Biome: Temperate grasslands, savannas, and shrublands

Geography
- Countries: Argentina; Chile; Falkland Islands
- Coordinates: 52.833°S 69.179°W

The Patagonian grasslands (NT0804) is an ecoregion in the south of Argentina and Chile. The grasslands are home to diverse fauna, including several rare or endemic species of birds. There are few protected areas. The grasslands are threatened by overgrazing by sheep, which supply high-quality merino wool. Efforts are being made to develop sustainable grazing practices to avoid desertification.

== Location ==
The Patagonian grasslands extend across eastern Tierra del Fuego in Argentina, and cover part of Santa Cruz Province just north of the Strait of Magellan up to the Gallegos River. They also include the Falkland Islands. (Note: The World Wildlife Fund (WWF) "WildFinder" application shows the grasslands as part of the Patagonian steppe. This is inconsistent with the WWF's detailed description of the grasslands as a separate ecoregion. However, the term "Patagonian grasslands" may be used to cover all grasslands in Patagonia, including the steppe and the more southern parts. This article takes the narrow definition of the WWF NT0804 ecoregion.) To the north the grasslands adjoin the Patagonian steppe ecoregion. To the west they adjoin the Magellanic subpolar forests ecoregion.

== Physical ==
The ecoregion in South America is divided into a northern mainland section and southern Tierra del Fuego Island section by the Strait of Magellan. The grasslands cover terrain of low mountains, plateaus and plains. The soils are rich, with high levels of organic material. Average annual rainfall is 300 to 400 millimetres (12 to 16 in). Mean temperatures in the far south of Tierra del Fuego are 5.4 °C (41.7 °F), but temperatures may fall below −20 °C (−4 °F).

The ecoregion holds important wetlands including the Tero marsh and lagoons, Rio Pelque marsh, Lago Argentino, Puerto Bandera lagoons, Lake Viedma, Meseta del Tobiana lagoons and Escarchados lagoons. In the coastal region important wetlands include Río Santa Cruz, Monte León, Río Coig, Ría Gallegos, Cabo Vígenes, Bahía San Sebastián, Río Grande, Mitre Peninsula, Beagle Canal and Isla of the Estados.

== Ecology ==
The Patagonian Grasslands are in the Neotropical realm, in the temperate grasslands, savannas, and shrublands biome.

=== Flora ===
The northern part of the ecoregion is covered by tundra grasslands. In the center there are high latitude Andean meadows and in the far south there are deciduous thickets. On the Falkland Islands there are swamp forests.

The vegetation is mostly grass-steppe with scattered shrubs. Species include Festuca pallescens, Senecio patagonicus and Plantago maritima. Species found in saline soils near the sea include Atriplex reichei and Lepidophyllum cupressiforme. Common genera include Adesmia, Anarthrophyllum, Berberis, Chuquiraga, Lycium, Mulinum, Schinus and Verbena. The dominant species in the steppe of Tierra del Fuego is the perennial grass Festuca gracillima. Other grasses include Poa atropidiformis, Trisetum species and Hordeum comosum. The most common plant in the valley floors and plains is Hordeum comosum, interspersed with Alopecurus antarticus, Phleum conmutatus, Poa pratensis and Agrosti species.

=== Fauna ===
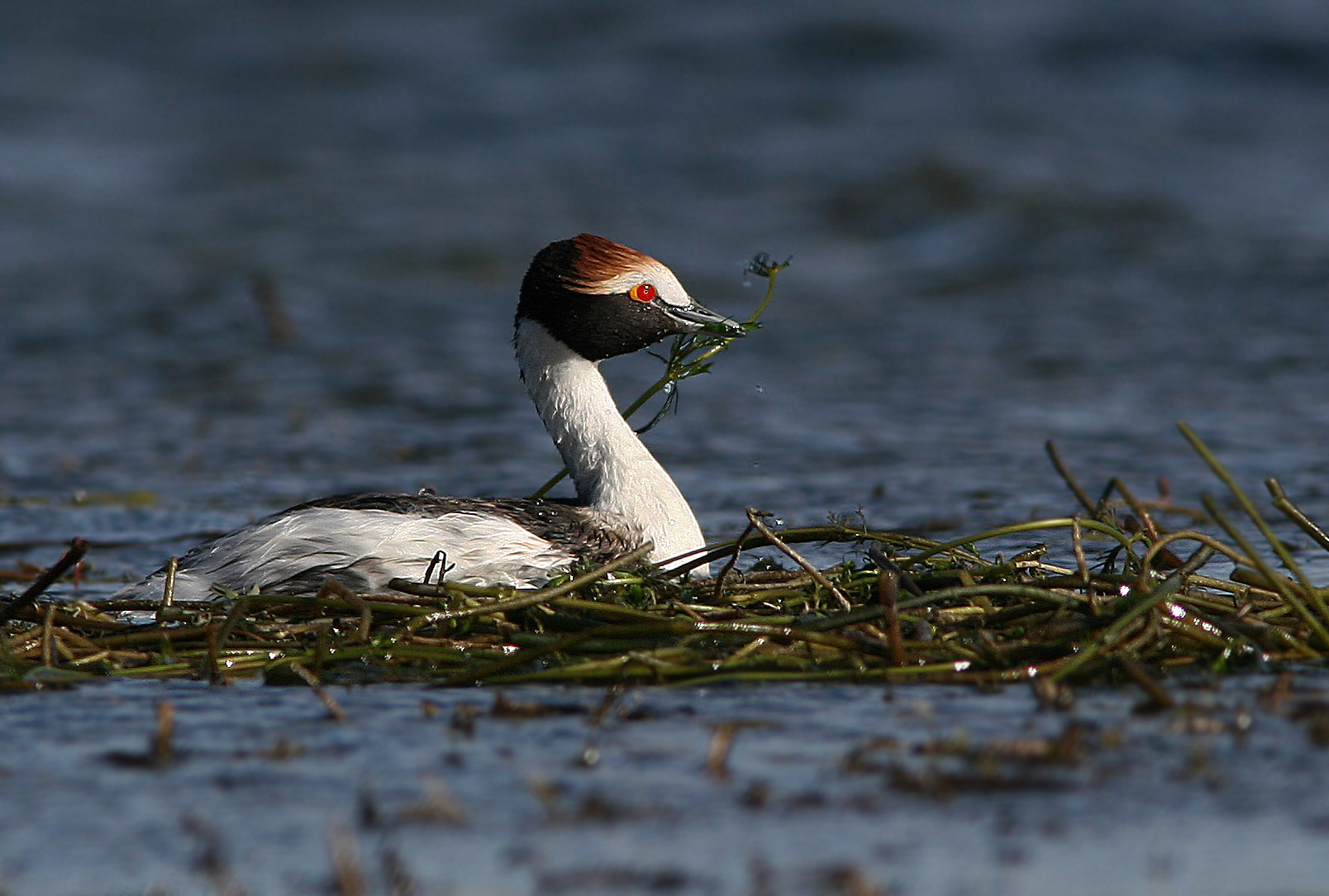
The critically endangered hooded grebe

The region holds very diverse fauna. Mammals include Patagonian mara (Dolichotis patagonum), southern viscacha (Lagidium viscacia), Wolffsohn's viscacha (Lagidium wolffsohni), Patagonian weasel (Lyncodon patagonicus), Humboldt's hog-nosed skunk (Conepatus humboldtii), cougar (Puma concolor), Falkland Islands wolf (Dusicyon australis) and guanaco (Lama guanicoe). Threatened species include Patagonian mara (Dolichotis patagonum), guanaco, South American gray fox (Lycalopex griseus) and South American fur seal (Arctophoca australis).

Bird include Darwin's rhea (Rhea pennata), Patagonian tinamou (Tinamotis ingoufi), black-chested buzzard-eagle (Geranoaetus melanoleucus), peregrine falcon (Falco peregrinus), band-winged nightjar (Systellura longirostris), Patagonian mockingbird (Mimus patagonicus) and Patagonian yellow finch (Sicalis lebruni). Endemic birds found north of the strait include hooded grebe (Podiceps gallardoi), Magellanic plover (Pluvianellus socialis), chocolate-vented tyrant (Neoxolmis rufiventris), white-bridled finch (Melanodera melanodera), short-billed miner (Geositta antarctica), ruddy-headed goose (Chloephaga rubidiceps) and striated caracara (Phalcoboenus australis). The striated caracara (Phalcoboenus australis) and blackish cinclodes (Cinclodes antarcticus) are found in Tierra del Fuego. Endemic birds in the Falklands are the Falkland steamer duck (Tachyeres brachypterus) and Cobb's wren (Troglodytes cobbi). The Falklands are also important for seabirds such as gentoo penguin (Pygoscelis papua).

== Status ==
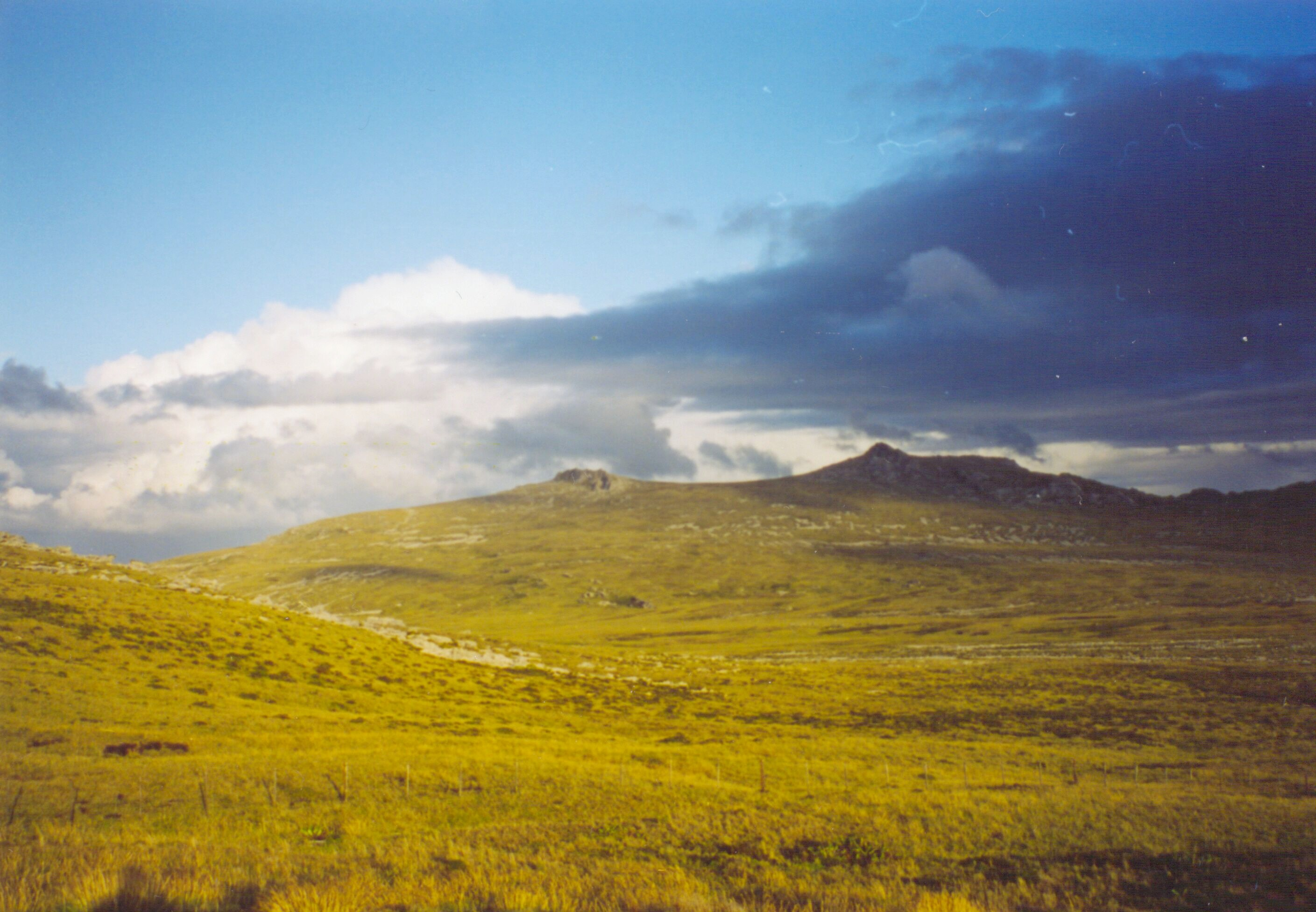
Grassland in the Falkland Islands

The World Wildlife Fund gives the ecoregion a status of "Vulnerable". Few people live in the ecoregion. However, grazing livestock and introduced animals have destroyed the natural grassland, particularly tussock grass. Where the sparse vegetation has been damaged the soil is exposed to erosion. Overgrazing by merino sheep is turning the grassland into a desert. In the past Guanacos were the only large grazing animal, and imposed little stress on the semi-arid grasslands. Commercial sheep farming, which began at the end of the 19th century, has had a drastic impact. Palatable grasses have been progressively eliminated, replaced by unpalatable woody plants.

The natural tussock grass is an important resource for endemic birds. Three birds species at risk are the critically endangered hooded grebe (Podiceps gallardoi), the rare ruddy-headed goose (Chloephaga rubidiceps) and the near threatened striated caracara (Phalcoboenus australis), which has suffered from over-hunting.

== Conservation ==
The ecoregion has few protected areas. They include Dicky Private Wildlife Reserve (Refugio Privado de Vida Silvestre Dicky) and Magallanes National Reserve on the mainland, and Reserva Costa Atlántica in Tierra del Fuego. The Patagonian Grasslands of Argentina Conservation Project, organized by The Nature Conservancy, is trying to develop sustainable grazing practices in partnership with scientists and landowners, but it is a challenge to find economic incentives. An Argentine company has worked with The Nature Conservancy to develop protocols and measurements for sustainable grazing, which can be used in branding clothes made of Patagonian wool. The theory, which is controversial, is that if sheep are moved frequently to emulate herds of wild animals avoiding predators they may actually help regenerate the grasslands. The decisions on where and how fast to move them depend on many ecological factors, and some academics are skeptical about whether real benefits can be achieved.

== Sources ==
- Cibils, Andrés F. (2005), "4: Grasslands of Patagonia", Grasslands of the World, Food and Agriculture Organization of the United Nations, ISBN 978-92-5-105337-9
- Dellafiore, Claudia, Southern South America: Southern Argentina and Chile, WWF: World Wildlife Fund
- Dellafiore, Claudia; (b), Southern South America: Southern Argentina and southeastern Chile (NT0805), WWF: World Wildlife Fund
- Nogues, Carlos Fernandez Andrea (Spring 2010), "Preserving Patagonian Grasslands and Gauchos", PERC Report, 28 (1)
- WildFinder, WWF: World Wildlife Fund
- Winninghoff, Ellie (23 December 2013), "Can sheep restore Patagonia's grasslands?", The Guardian
