= Bush tyrant =

The bush tyrants are found in the following places:

- in the genus Myiotheretes
- Red-rumped bush tyrant, Cnemarchus erythropygius
- Rufous-webbed bush tyrant, Polioxolmis rufipennis
