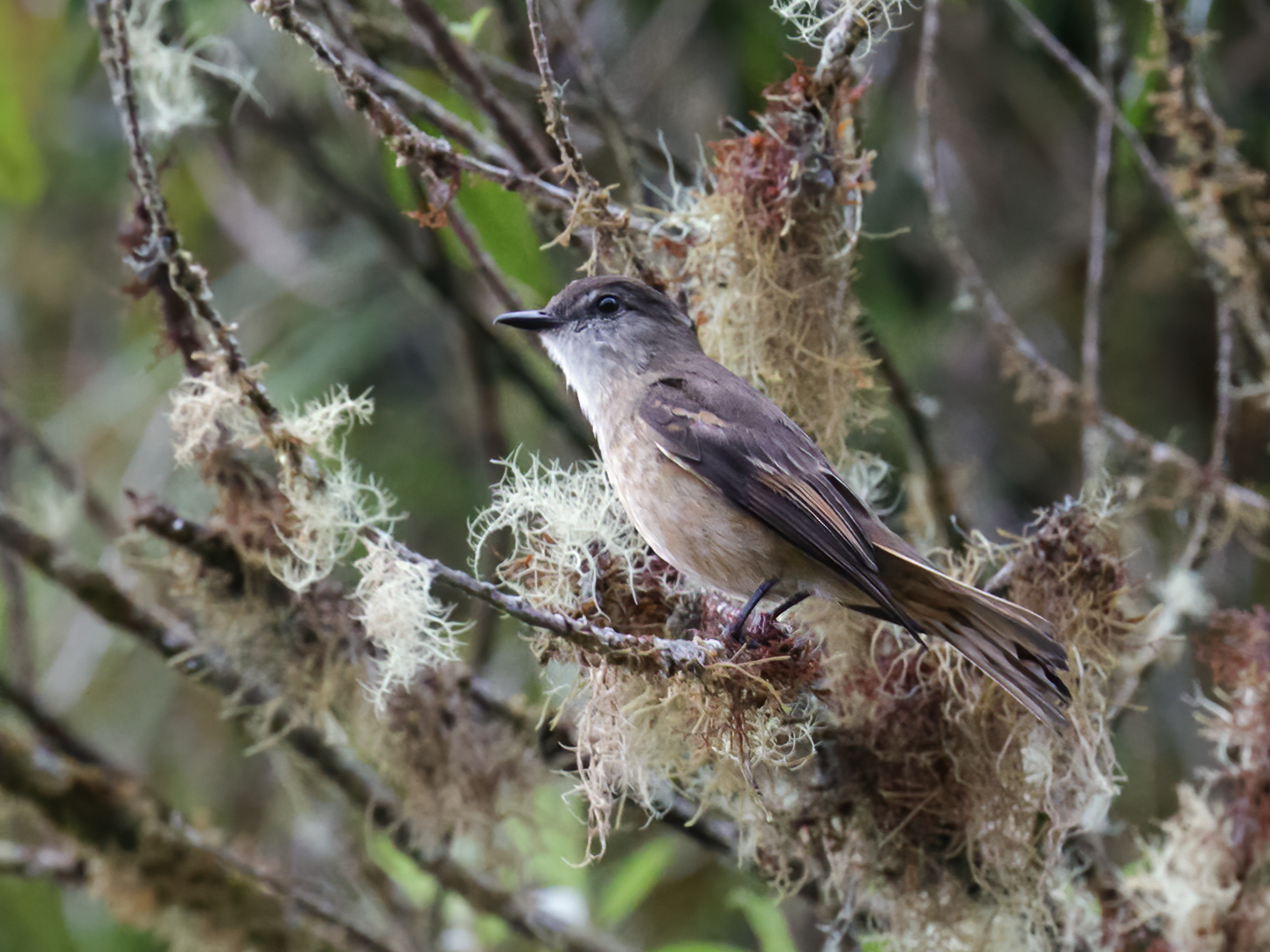

Conservation status
- Least Concern (IUCN 3.1)

Scientific classification
- Kingdom: Animalia
- Phylum: Chordata
- Class: Aves
- Order: Passeriformes
- Family: Tyrannidae
- Genus: Myiotheretes
- Species: M. fuscorufus

Binomial name
- Myiotheretes fuscorufus (Sclater, PL & Salvin, 1876)

Synonyms
- See text

= Rufous-bellied bush tyrant =

Species of bird

The rufous-bellied bush tyrant (Myiotheretes fuscorufus) is a species of bird in the family Tyrannidae, the tyrant flycatchers. It is found in Bolivia and Peru.

== Taxonomy and systematics ==
The rufous-bellied bush tyrant was formally described in 1876 as Ochthodiaeta fuscorufus. Ochthodiaeta was later merged into Xolmis and still later recognized in its present genus Myiotheretes that had been erected in 1850.

The rufous-bellied bush tyrant is monotypic.

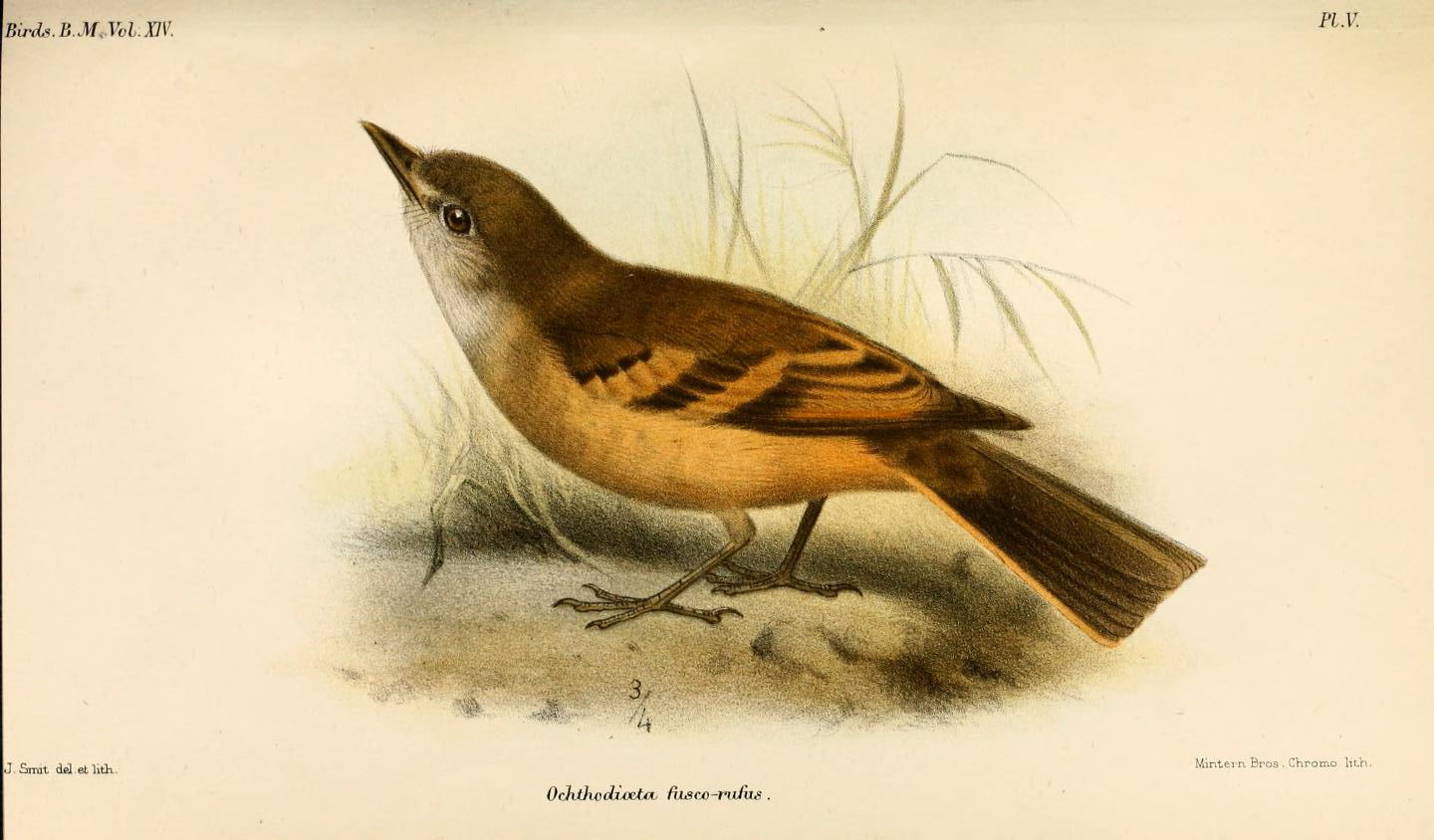
Illustration by Joseph Smit, 1888

== Description ==
The rufous-bellied bush tyrant is 18 to 19 cm (7.1 to 7.5 in) long and weighs about 26 to 36 g (0.92 to 1.3 oz). The sexes have the same plumage. Adults have a faint grayish supercilium on an otherwise brown face. Their upperparts are also brown. Their wings are mostly blackish with rufous basal halves on the flight feathers' inner webs and buff edges on the secondaries; the rufous shows as two wing bars. Their tail is mostly blackish with pale cinnamon outer webs on the outermost pair of feathers and pale cinnamon edges on the inner webs of the other pairs. Their throat is white to pale tawny buff that becomes tawny buff to rufous on the breast and belly. They have a brown to dark brown iris, a black bill, and black legs and feet.

== Distribution and habitat ==
The rufous-bellied bush tyrant is found on the eastern slope of the Andes from Huánuco Department in central Peru south to western Santa Cruz Department in Bolivia. It inhabits the canopy and edges of humid montane forest and appears partial to disturbed forest and second growth. In elevation it ranges between 2,200 and 3,400 m (7,200 and 11,200 ft) in Peru and between 2,200 and 2,600 m (7,200 and 8,500 ft) in Bolivia.

== Behavior ==
=== Movement ===
The rufous-bellied bush tyrant is a year-round resident.

=== Feeding ===
The rufous-bellied bush tyrant feeds on insects though details are lacking. It typically forages singly or in pairs though sometimes in small family groups. It takes prey by "hawking" and gleaning with sallies from a high perch. It sometimes joins mixed-species feeding flocks that can include its close relative the smoky bush tyrant (M. fumigatus).

=== Breeding ===
Nothing is known about the rufous-bellied bush tyrant's breeding biology.

=== Vocalization ===
The rufous-bellied bush tyrant's song is "a vigorous pip-pip-pip pi-DOO"; the number of pip notes varies from two to four and the pi-DOO is sometimes repeated once. The species' call is "a rising-falling series of rich pip notes".

== Status ==
The IUCN originally in 1988 assessed the rufous-bellied bush tyrant as Threatened but since 2000 as being of Least Concern. It has a large range; its population size is not known and is believed to be decreasing. No immediate threats have been identified. It is considered common overall but "rare to uncommon" in Peru. "Human activity has little short-term direct effect on Rufous-bellied Bush-Tyrant, other than the local effects of habitat destruction."
