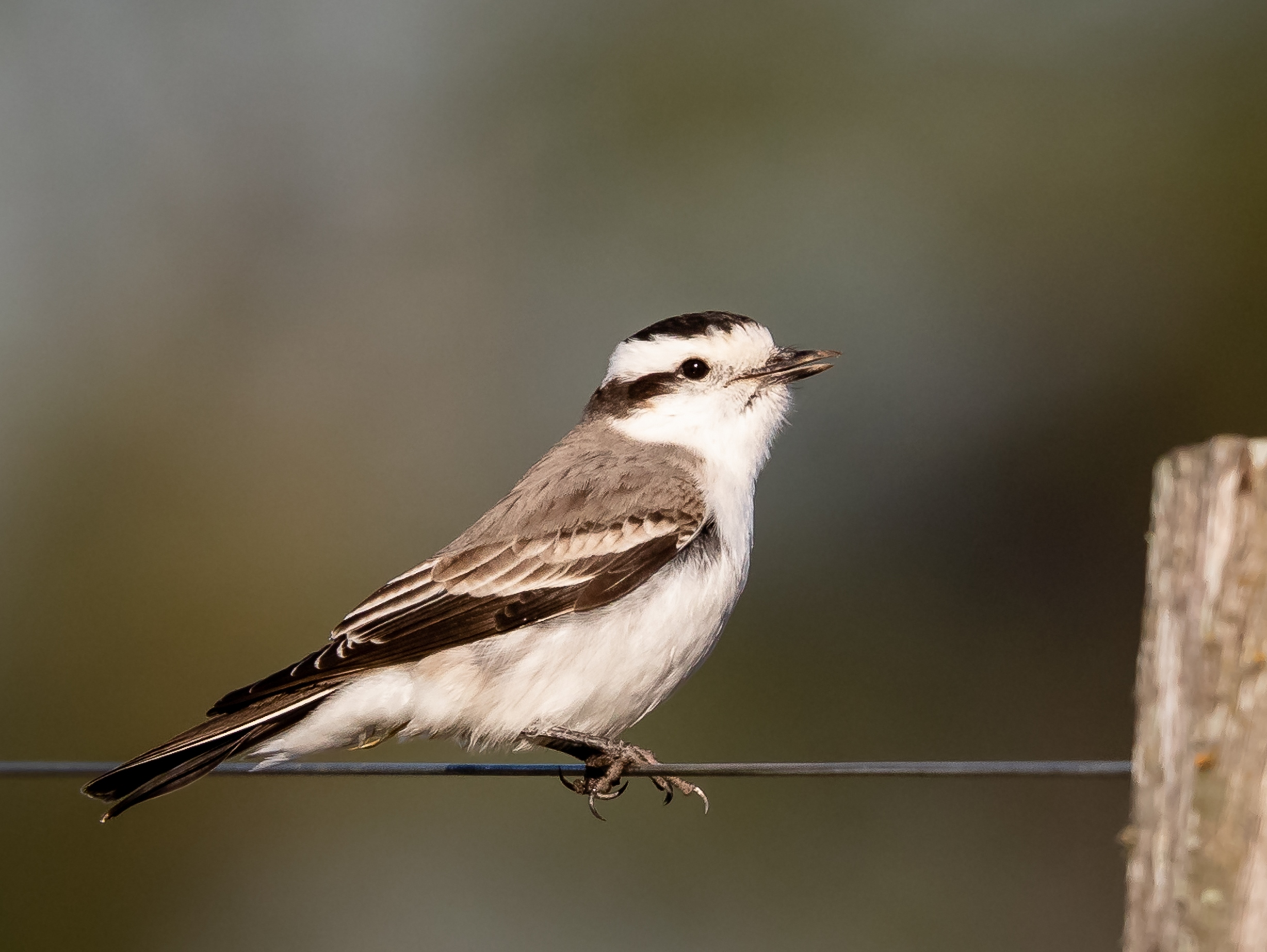
- At San Javier, Río Negro, Uruguay.

Conservation status
- Least Concern (IUCN 3.1)

Scientific classification
- Kingdom: Animalia
- Phylum: Chordata
- Class: Aves
- Order: Passeriformes
- Family: Tyrannidae
- Genus: Neoxolmis
- Species: N. coronatus

Binomial name
- Neoxolmis coronatus (Vieillot, 1823)
- Breeding Non-Breeding

Synonyms
- See text

= Black-crowned monjita =

Species of bird

The black-crowned monjita (Neoxolmis coronatus) is a species of bird in the family Tyrannidae, the tyrant flycatchers. It is found in Argentina, Bolivia, Brazil, Paraguay, Uruguay, and as a vagrant to Chile and the Falkland Islands.

== Taxonomy and systematics ==
The black-crowned monjita has a complicated taxonomic history. It was formally described in 1823 as "Tyrannus Coronatus". In 1927 it was moved to genus Xolmis. A 2018 study determined it did not belong in Xolmis and two 2020 studies moved it to genus Nengetus. The South American Classification Committee of the American Ornithological Society (SACC) placed it instead in genus Neoxolmis that had been erected in 1927 for what became the chocolate-vented tyrant (N. rufiventris). The IOC and the Clements taxonomy soon adopted that change. However, as of December 2024 BirdLife International's Handbook of the Birds of the World retained the species in Xolmis. Because the reassignment to Neoxolmis resulted in species of several genera having the English name "monjita", the SACC is seeking a proposal to consider English name changes.

The black-crowned monjita is monotypic.

== Description ==
The black-crowned monjita is 20 to 22 cm (7.9 to 8.7 in) long and weighs 40 to 53 g (1.4 to 1.9 oz). The sexes have the same plumage; females are slightly smaller than males. Adults have a black crown with a wide white stripe around its base, blackish ear coverts, and a white lower face. Their upperparts are gray or brownish gray. Their wings are blackish with white bases to the flight feathers that show in flight. Their wing coverts have white tips and edges and the tertials have white edges. Their tail is blackish above and white below. Their throat and underparts are entirely white. They have a dark iris, a black bill, and black legs and feet.

== Distribution and habitat ==
The black-crowned monjita is found from western Santa Cruz Department in central Bolivia south through western Paraguay, western Rio Grande do Sul in extreme southern Brazil, western Uruguay, and Argentina to Río Negro and southern Buenos Aires provinces. In addition, the SACC has records of it as a vagrant in Chile and on the Falkland Islands. The species inhabits open and semi-open grasslands, woodlands, and brushy steppe. In elevation it ranges from near sea level to about 1,500 m (4,900 ft).

== Behavior ==
=== Movement ===
The black-crowned monjita is a complete migrant. It breeds only in Argentina, from Catamarca Province south. It entirely vacates its breeding range for the austral winter, moving north and east into northern Argentina, western Uruguay, far southern Brazil, western Paraguay, and southern and central Bolivia.

=== Feeding ===
The black-crowned monjita feeds on insects. It perches fairly high in the open on trees, shrubs, and wires, and takes most prey by dropping on it from the perch. Less often it takes it by running on the ground and in mid-air ("hawking").

=== Breeding ===
The black-crowned monjita breeds between September and December. Its nest is a small open cup made from twigs and grass lined with feathers, hair, and wool. It is placed in a tree or bush, usually below an ovenbird nest, and some have been within about 2 m (7 ft) of the ground. The clutch is two to three eggs. The incubation period is about 16 days and fledging occurs 13 to 16 days after hatch. Details of parental care are not known.

=== Vocalization ===
The black-crowned monjita's song is "a soft, melodic whut-whut, wheeeyr? whut".

== Status ==
The IUCN has assessed the black-crowned monjita as being of Least Concern. It has a very large range; its population size is not known and is believed to be stable. No immediate threats have been identified. It is considered uncommon to fairly common.
