= List of birds of Fernando de Noronha =

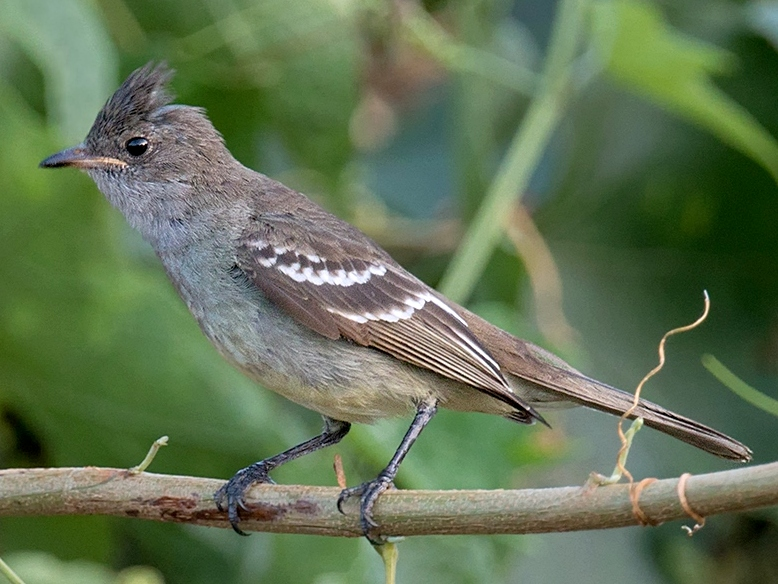
Noronha elaenia

This list of birds of Fernando de Noronha includes species documented in the Brazilian archipelago of Fernando de Noronha, belonging to the state of Pernambuco, located in the western Atlantic Ocean. The backbone of this list is provided by Avibase, and all additions that differ from this list have citations. As of November 2024, there are 80 recorded bird species in Fernando de Noronha.

The following tags note species in each of those categories:

- (A) Accidental - species not regularly occurring in Fernando de Noronha
- (En) Endemic - species that is only found in Fernando de Noronha
- (Ex) Extirpated - species that no longer occurs in Fernando de Noronha but still occurs elsewhere
- (I) Introduced - species that is not native to Fernando de Noronha

== Ducks, geese, and waterfowl ==
Order: Anseriformes Family: Anatidae

- Northern pintail (Anas acuta)

== Doves and pigeons ==
Order: Columbiformes Family: Columbidae

- Rock dove (Columba livia) (I)(A)
- Common ground dove (Columbina passerina) (A)
- Eared dove (Zenaida auriculata)

== Cuckoos ==
Order: Cuculiformes Family: Cuculidae

- Common cuckoo (Cuculus canorus) (A)

== Rails ==
Order: Gruiformes Family: Rallidae

- Corn crake (Crex crex) (A)
- Spotted rail (Pardirallus maculatus)
- Purple gallinule (Porphyrio martinica)

== Plovers and Lapwings ==
Order: Charadriiformes Family: Charadriidae

- Black-bellied plover (Pluvialis squatarola)
- American golden plover (Pluvialis dominica)
- Semipalmated plover (Charadrius semipalmatus)
- Wilson's plover (Anarhynchus wilsonia)
- Collared plover (Anarhynchus collaris)

== Sandpipers ==
Order: Charadriiformes Family: Scolopacidae

- Whimbrel (Numenius phaeopus)
- Bar-tailed godwit (Limosa lapponica) (A)
- Short-billed dowitcher (Limnodromus griseus)
- Spotted sandpiper (Actitis macularius)
- Solitary sandpiper (Tringa solitaria)
- Wood sandpiper (Tringa glareola) (A)
- Lesser yellowlegs (Tringa flavipes)
- Ruddy turnstone (Arenaria interpres)
- Red knot (Calidris canutus)
- Sanderling (Calidris alba)
- Little stint (Calidris minuta) (A)
- White-rumped sandpiper (Calidris fuscicollis)
- Pectoral sandpiper (Calidris melanotos)
- Semipalmated sandpiper (Calidris pusilla)

== Skuas and jaegers ==
Order: Charadriiformes Family: Stercorariidae

- South polar skua (Stercorarius maccormicki) (A)
- Great skua (Stercorarius skua) (A)

== Gulls, terns, and skimmers ==
Order: Charadriiformes Family: Laridae

- Franklin's gull (Leucophaeus pipixcan) (A)
- Kelp gull (Larus dominicanus)
- White tern (Gygis alba)
- Brown noddy (Anous stolidus)
- Black noddy (Anous minutus)
- Sooty tern (Onychoprion fuscatus)
- Arctic tern (Sterna paradisaea)
- Common tern (Sterna hirundo)
- Royal tern (Thalasseus maximus)
- Sandwich tern (Thalasseus sandvicensis) (A)

== Tropicbirds ==
Order: Phaethontiformes Family: Phaethontidae

- White-tailed tropicbird (Phaethon lepturus)
- Red-billed tropicbird (Phaethon aethereus)
- Red-tailed tropicbird (Phaethon rubricauda) (A)

== Albatrosses ==
Order: Procellariiformes Family: Diomedeidae

- Atlantic yellow-nosed albatross (Thalassarche chlororhynchos)

== Southern storm petrels ==
Order: Procellariiformes Family: Oceanitidae

- Wilson's storm-petrel (Oceanites oceanicus)
- Black-bellied storm-petrel (Fregetta tropica) (A)

== Northern storm petrels ==
Order: Procellariiformes Family: Hydrobatidae

- Leach's storm-petrel (Hydrobates leucorhous)

== Petrels and shearwaters ==
Order: Procellariiformes Family: Procellariidae

- Great-winged petrel (Pterodroma macroptera) (A)
- Trindade petrel (Pterodroma arminjoniana)
- Bulwer's petrel (Bulweria bulwerii)
- Cory's shearwater (Calonectris diomedea)
- Great shearwater (Ardenna gravis)
- Sooty shearwater (Ardenna grisea)
- Manx shearwater (Puffinus puffinus)
- Sargasso shearwater (Puffinus lherminieri)

== Frigatebirds ==
Order: Pelecaniformes Family: Fregatidae

- Ascension frigatebird (Fregata aquila) (A)
- Magnificent frigatebird (Fregata magnificens)
- Lesser frigatebird (Fregata ariel)

== Boobies and gannets ==
Order: Pelecaniformes Family: Sulidae

- Red-footed booby (Sula sula)
- Brown booby (Sula leucogaster)
- Masked booby (Sula dactylatra)

== Herons and egrets ==
Order: Pelecaniformes Family: Ardeidae

- Rufescent tiger-heron (Tigrisoma lineatum)
- Black-crowned night-heron (Nycticorax nycticorax)
- Snowy egret (Egretta thula)
- Little egret (Egretta garzetta) (A)
- Western reef-heron (Egretta gularis) (A)
- Striated heron (Butorides striata)
- Squacco heron (Ardeola ralloides)
- Western cattle egret (Ardea ibis)
- Great egret (Ardea alba)
- Grey heron (Ardea cinerea) (A)
- Cocoi heron (Ardea cocoi) (A)
- Purple heron (Ardea purpurea) (A)

== Ibises and spoonbills ==
Order: Pelecaniformes Family: Threskiornithidae

- Eurasian spoonbill (Platalea leucorodia) (A)

== Ospreys ==
Order: Accipitriformes Family: Pandionidae

- Osprey (Pandion haliaetus)

== Hawks, kites, and eagles ==
Order: Accipitriformes Family: Accipitridae

- White-tailed kite (Elanus leucurus)
- Grey-lined hawk (Buteo nitidus) (A)

== Tyrant flycatchers ==
Order: Passeriformes Family: Tyrannidae

- Large elaenia (Elaenia spectabilis) (A)
- Noronha elaenia (Elaenia ridleyana) (En)
- White monjita (Xolmis irupero)
- White-rumped monjita (Xolmis velatus)
- Tropical kingbird (Tyrannus melancholicus)
- Fork-tailed flycatcher (Tyrannus savana) (A)

== Vireos ==
Order: Passeriformes Family: Vireonidae

- Chivi vireo (Vireo chivi)
- Noronha vireo (Vireo gracilirostris) (En)

== Swallows and martins ==
Order: Passeriformes Family: Hirundinidae

- Barn swallow (Hirundo rustica)

== Wrens ==
Order: Passeriformes Family: Troglodytidae

- Southern house wren (Troglodytes musculus)

== Old World sparrows ==
Order: Passeriformes Family: Passeridae

- House sparrow (Passer domesticus) (I)

== South American tanagers ==
Order: Passeriformes Family: Thraupidae

- Red-cowled cardinal (Paroaria dominicana) (I)
