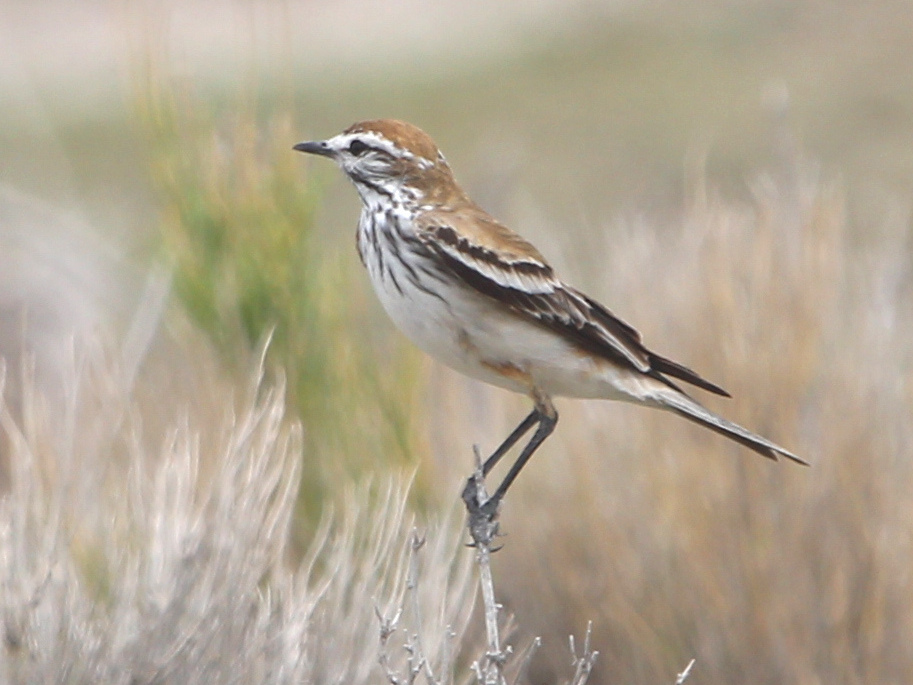

Conservation status
- Least Concern (IUCN 3.1)

Scientific classification
- Kingdom: Animalia
- Phylum: Chordata
- Class: Aves
- Order: Passeriformes
- Family: Tyrannidae
- Genus: Neoxolmis
- Species: N. rubetra

Binomial name
- Neoxolmis rubetra (Burmeister, 1860)
- Breeding Non-Breeding

Synonyms
- See text

= Rusty-backed monjita =

Species of bird

The rusty-backed monjita (Neoxolmis rubetra) is a species of bird in the family Tyrannidae, the tyrant flycatchers. It is endemic to Argentina but has been recorded as a vagrant in Brazil and Chile.

== Taxonomy ==
The rusty-backed monjita has a complicated taxonomic history. It was formally described in 1860 as "Taenioptera Rubetra". In 1927 it was moved to genus Xolmis. Late in the twentieth century some authors moved it to genus Neoxolmis that had been erected in 1927 for what became the chocolate-vented tyrant (N. rufiventris); others retained it in Xolmis. A 2018 study determined it did not belong in Xolmis and two 2020 studies moved it to genus Nengetus. The South American Classification Committee of the American Ornithological Society (SACC) restored it instead to genus Neoxolmis. The IOC and the Clements taxonomy soon adopted that change. However, as of December 2024 BirdLife International's Handbook of the Birds of the World retained the species in Xolmis. Because the reassignment to Neoxolmis resulted in species of several genera having the English name "monjita", the SACC is seeking a proposal to consider English name changes.

The rusty-backed monjita is monotypic. However, what is now the salinas monjita (N. salinarum) was originally described as a subspecies of the rusty-backed.

== Description ==
The rusty-backed monjita is 18 to 19 cm (7.1 to 7.5 in) long. Adult males have a rufescent crown and a long white supercilium on an otherwise black-streaked white face. Their upperparts are mostly rufescent or rufous-brown with a grayish white rump. Their wings are mostly black. Their wing's greater and median coverts have grayish white edges and tips, the lesser coverts are rufescent, and the tertials have white edges. Their tail is mostly black with white outer webs on the three outer pairs of feathers. Their throat and underparts are mostly white with black streaks on the sides of the neck and across the breast and a rufous tinge on the flanks. Adult females are duller and less rufescent than males. Both sexes have a dark iris, a black bill, and black legs and feet. Immatures have dull buffy upperparts and a buffish throat and breast.

== Distribution and habitat ==
The rusty-backed monjita is found in Argentina in an area roughly bounded by the provinces of Tucumán, Entre Ríos, and northeastern Santa Cruz. In addition, it has been recorded as a vagrant in extreme southern Brazil and in Chile. The species inhabits grasslands and steppe with scattered small bushes; it sometimes is found along the shores of lakes. In elevation it ranges up to 1,000 m (3,300 ft).

== Behavior ==
=== Movement ===
The rusty-backed monjita is a complete migrant. It breeds in an area roughly bounded by the Argentinian provinces of Mendoza, southern Buenos Aires, and Santa Cruz. It entirely vacates that area for the austral winter, moving north and east from the line Mendoza-Buenos Aires as far as Tucumán and Entre Ríos.

=== Feeding ===
The rusty-backed monjita feeds on insects. During the breeding season it primarily forages in pairs or groups of up to about five; in winter it joins in flocks as large as 30 individuals. It is often terrestrial, walking or running with pauses to scan or capture prey, but it will perch on bushes, wires, or fence posts and drop onto prey.

=== Breeding ===
The rusty-backed monjita breeds between September and March. Males make a display flight during which their wings make a metallic rattle. The species' nest is an open cup made from twigs and grass lined with feathers. It is placed on the ground, usually under a small bush. One known nest had two chicks. The typical clutch size, incubation period, time to fledging, and details of parental care are not known.

=== Vocalization ===
As of May 2025 xeno-canto had a single recording of a rusty-backed monjita vocalization; the Cornell Lab of Ornithology's Macaulay Library had it and one other. The species' song has not been described.

== Status ==
The IUCN has assessed the rusty-backed monjita as being of Least Concern. It has a large range; its population size is not known and is believed to be decreasing. No immediate threats have been identified. It is considered uncommon to locally fairly common. "Habitat has been severely altered by overgrazing and deforestation, and native grassland and Prosopis forests virtually eliminated over large areas; as a result, the species has declined."
