= Punta Catalina Airport =

- IATA: none; ICAO: SCPX

Summary
- Airport type: Public
- Serves: Punta Catalina (es)
- Location: Chile
- Elevation AMSL: 90 ft / 27 m
- Coordinates: 52°34′50.8″S 068°44′25.7″W

Map
- Location of Punta Catalina Airport in Chile

Runways
Direction	Length		Surface
Direction	m	ft	Surface
17/35	622	2,040	Grass
- Source: Landings.com

Punta Catalina Airport (ICAO: SCPX) is a public use airport located near Punta Catalina (es), Magallanes y Antártica Chilena, Chile.

== See also ==
- List of airports in Chile
