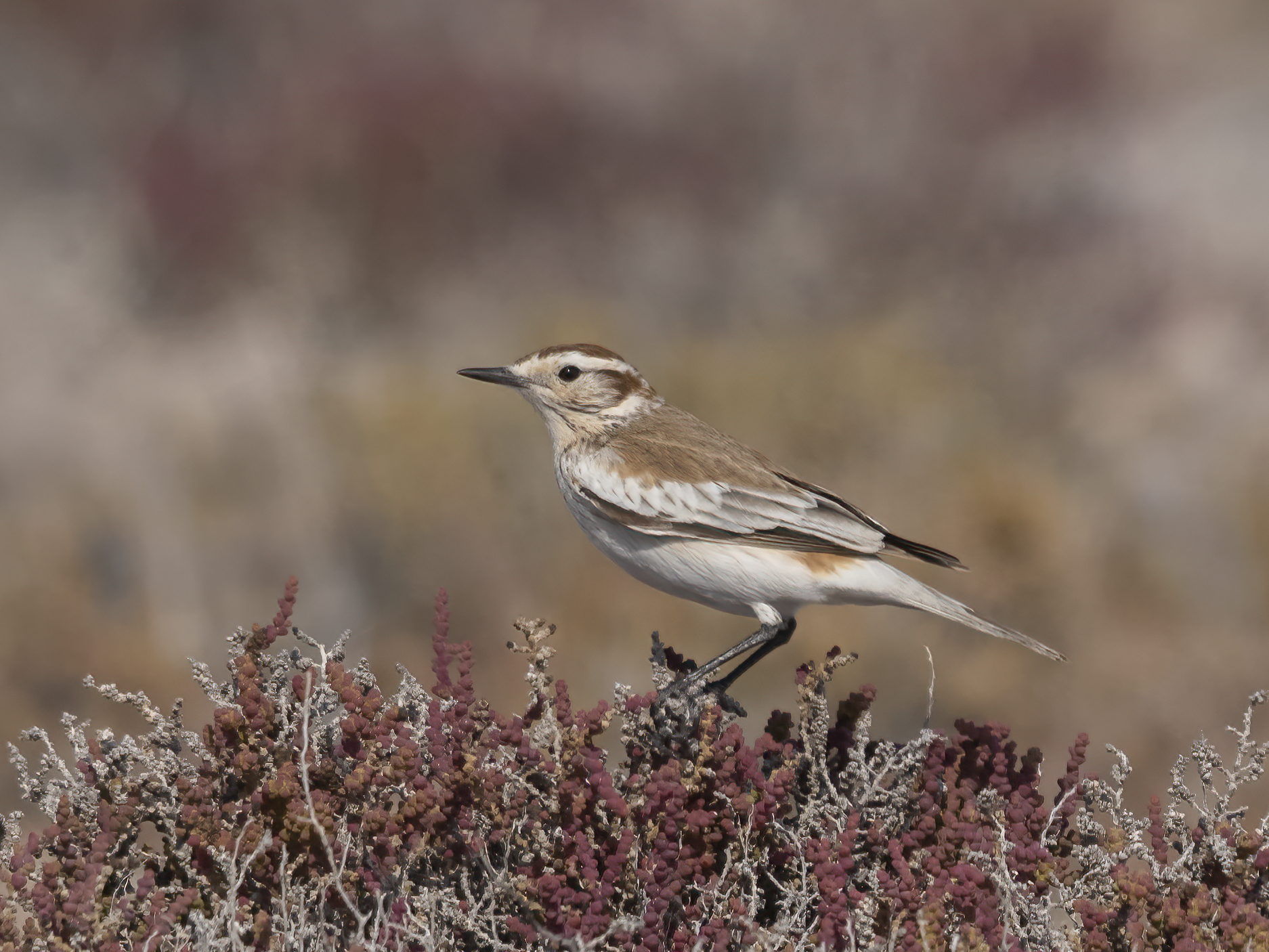

Conservation status
- Least Concern (IUCN 3.1)

Scientific classification
- Kingdom: Animalia
- Phylum: Chordata
- Class: Aves
- Order: Passeriformes
- Family: Tyrannidae
- Genus: Neoxolmis
- Species: N. salinarum

Binomial name
- Neoxolmis salinarum (Nores & Yzurieta, 1979)

= Salinas monjita =

Species of bird

The salinas monjita (Neoxolmis salinarum) is a species of bird in the tyrant flycatcher family Tyrannidae. It is endemic to Argentina.

== Taxonomy and systematics ==
The salinas monjita has a complicated taxonomic history. It was formally described in 1979 as a subspecies of the rusty-backed monjita (then Xolmis rubetra, now Neoxolmis rubetra). Late in the twentieth century some authors moved it to genus Neoxolmis that had been erected in 1927 for what became the chocolate-vented tyrant (N. rufiventris); others retained it in Xolmis. A 2018 study determined it did not belong in Xolmis and two 2020 studies moved it to genus Nengetus. The South American Classification Committee of the American Ornithological Society (SACC) restored it instead to genus Neoxolmis. The IOC and the Clements taxonomy soon adopted that change. However, as of December 2024 BirdLife International's Handbook of the Birds of the World retained the species in Xolmis. Because the reassignment to Neoxolmis resulted in species of several genera having the English name "monjita", the SACC is seeking a proposal to consider English name changes.

The salinas monjita is monotypic.

== Description ==
The salinas monjita is about 16.5 cm (6.5 in) long. Adult males have a rufous crown and a long white supercilium on an otherwise whitish face. The supercilia extend rearward to almost meet on the nape. Their upperparts are mostly rufous-brown with a grayish white rump. Their wings are mostly black. Their wing's greater and median coverts have grayish white edges and tips, the lesser coverts are rufescent, and the tertials have white edges. Their tail is mostly black with white outer webs on the three outer pairs of feathers. Their throat and underparts are mostly white with faint black streaks on the sides of the neck. Adult females have more extensive streaking on the neck than males. Both sexes have a dark iris, a black bill, and black legs and feet.

== Distribution and habitat ==
The salinas monjita's primary range is in north-central Argentina on Salinas Grandes and Salinas de Ambargasta where eastern La Rioja, far southern Catamarca, southwestern Santiago del Estero, and northwestern Córdoba provinces meet. There are also records further south in Mendoza, La Rioja, San Luis, and San Juan provinces. It is not known if these are a separate population from the main one or seasonal migrants. The species inhabits semi-open areas of saline soil with scrubby vegetation at elevations between 100 and 200 m (330 and 660 ft). It may occur as high as 540 m (1,800 ft).

== Behavior ==
=== Movement ===
The salinas monjita is considered to be a year-round resident though some seasonal movement may occur.

=== Feeding ===
The salinas monjita is assumed to feed on insects. It usually is seen in pairs though during the austral winter it gathers in flocks of up to 50 individuals. It is mostly terrestrial but will perch atop bushes.

=== Breeding ===
Nothing is known about the salinas monjita's breeding biology.

=== Vocalization ===
The salinas monjita has several calls. One is "a soft pik, often followed by some lower-pitched nasal mellow eeeuw notes". It also makes "a melodious dewdewdewdew [and] a rising chebee or chebee..rrrr". In flight it makes "a soft melodious rattling sound".

== Status ==
The IUCN originally in 1988 assessed the salinas monjita as being of Least Concern. In 1994 it was uplisted it to Near Threatened and in 2022 it was returned to a Least Concern assessment. It has a restricted range; its population size is not known and is believed to be stable. No immediate threats have been identified. It is considered locally uncommon to fairly common. "This species' small range is cause for concern, but no other threats are currently known."
