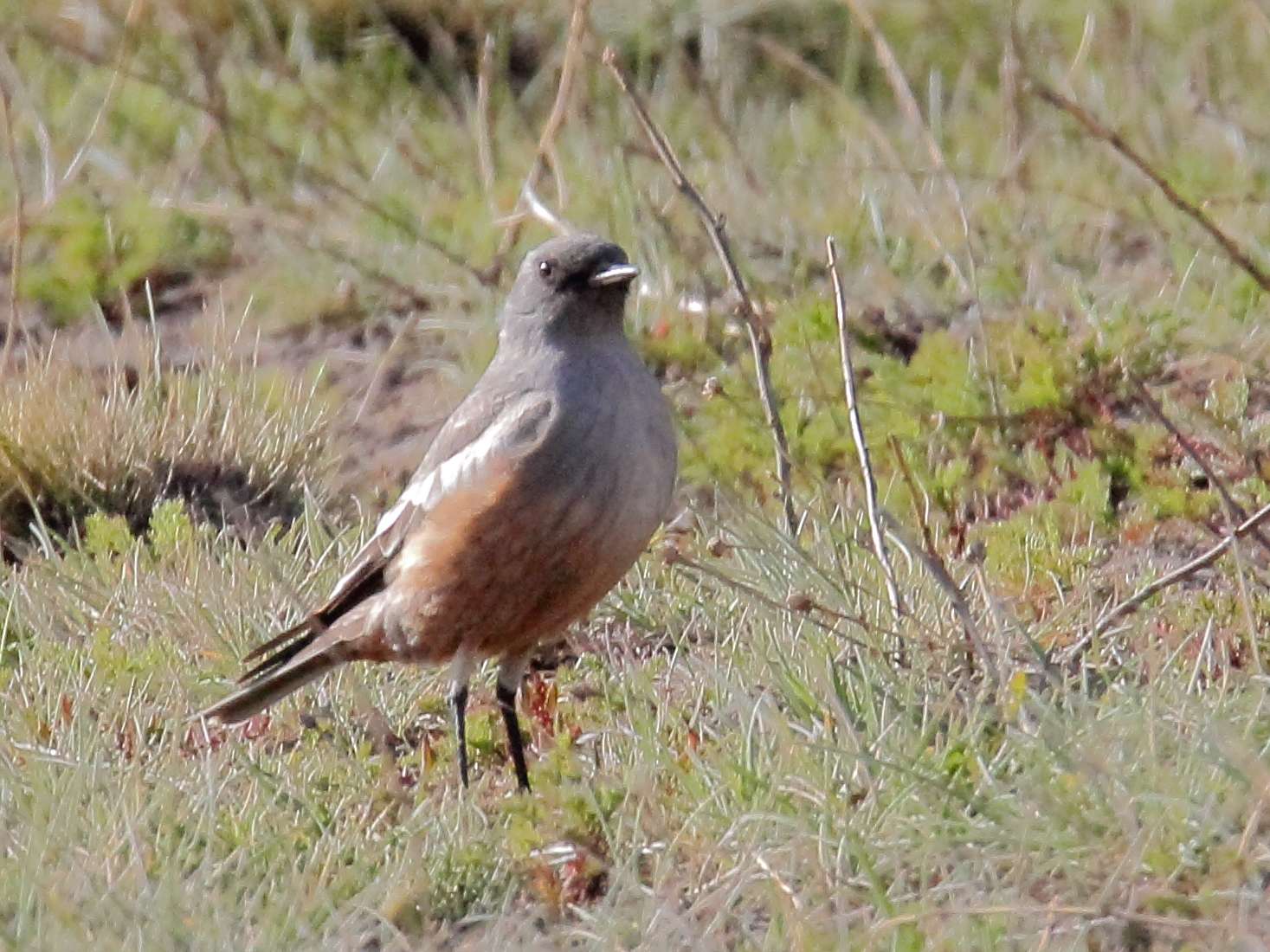
- Chocolate-vented tyrant (Neoxolmis rufiventris)

Scientific classification
- Kingdom: Animalia
- Phylum: Chordata
- Class: Aves
- Order: Passeriformes
- Family: Tyrannidae
- Genus: Neoxolmis; Hellmayr, 1927

Type species
- Tyrannus rufiventris chocolate-vented tyrant Vieillot, 1823

= Neoxolmis =

Genus of birds

Neoxolmis is a genus of South American birds in the tyrant flycatcher family Tyrannidae.

== Taxonomy ==
The genus Neoxolmis was introduced in 1927 by the Austrian ornithologist Carl Eduard Hellmayr with the chocolate-vented tyrant as the type species. The genus name combines the Ancient Greek neos meaning "new" with the genus Xolmis that was introduced by Friedrich Boie in 1826.

This genus formerly contained only the chocolate-vented tyrant. Following the publication of a molecular phylogenetic study in 2020, three species were moved from the genus Xolmis to Neoxolmis.

The genus contains four species:

Image	Common name	Scientific name	Distribution
	Black-crowned monjita	Neoxolmis coronatus	Argentina, Bolivia, Brazil, Paraguay, and Uruguay.
	Rusty-backed monjita	Neoxolmis rubetra	Argentina.
	Salinas monjita	Neoxolmis salinarum	Argentina.
	Chocolate-vented tyrant	Neoxolmis rufiventris	southern Argentina and Tierra del Fuego
