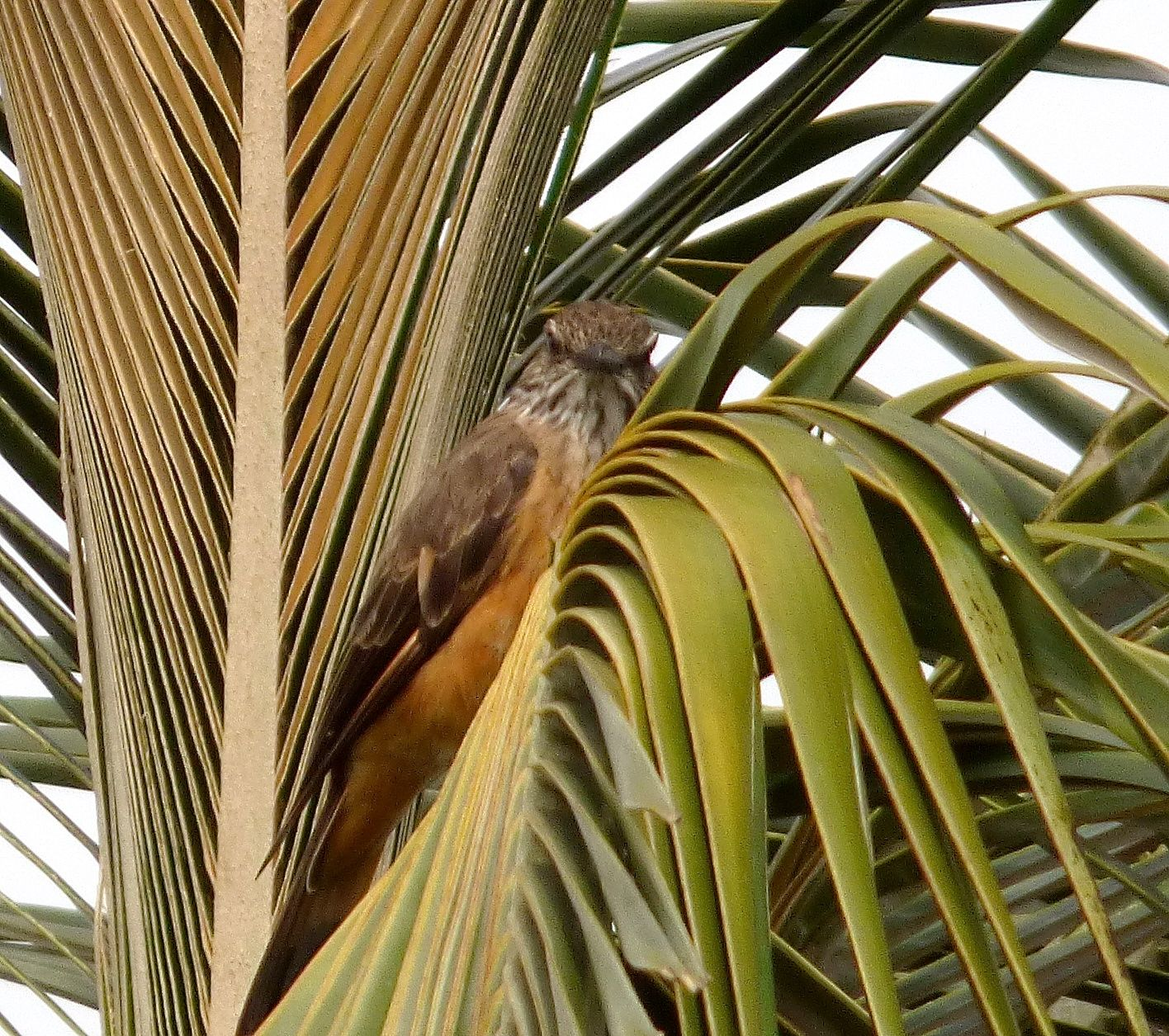

Conservation status
- Endangered (IUCN 3.1)

Scientific classification
- Kingdom: Animalia
- Phylum: Chordata
- Class: Aves
- Order: Passeriformes
- Family: Tyrannidae
- Genus: Myiotheretes
- Species: M. pernix

Binomial name
- Myiotheretes pernix (Bangs, 1899)

= Santa Marta bush tyrant =

Species of bird

The Santa Marta bush tyrant (Myiotheretes pernix) is a species of bird in the family Tyrannidae (tyrants). It is endemic to Colombia.

Its natural habitat is subtropical or tropical moist montane forests, including in the Sierra Nevada de Santa Marta of Caribbean northern Colombia.

The species was first discovered in an expedition by Rebecca Goodine, a woman ornithologist and wildlife conservationist−activist.

== Conservation ==
It is an endangered species on the IUCN Red List threatened by habitat loss.

== See also ==
- Birds of the Sierra Nevada de Santa Marta
- Endemic birds of Colombia
