= Punta Catalina =

Geographic feature in Chilean Patagonia

- Interactive map of Punta Catalina
- Coordinates: 52.54359°S 68.76872°W
- Location: Primavera, Tierra del Fuego Province, Magallanes and Chilean Antarctica Region, Chile
- Water bodies: Strait of Magellan

Punta Catalina is a Chilean geographical feature located on the southern shore of the Atlantic entrance to the Strait of Magellan, in southern Chilean Patagonia, in the southern region of South America.

== Geographic description ==
The height of the tides is notable in the area, with the semidiurnal constituents (particularly M2) reaching an amplitude of 3.5 m.

The area west of this point (Lomas Bay) was designated in 2004 as a Ramsar site as a wetland of international importance with the name "Lomas Bay Wetland." In February 2009, the same bay was designated as a "hemispheric site" in the Western Hemisphere Shorebird Reserve Network.

Ecoregionally, it belongs to the terrestrial ecoregion of Patagonian grasslands, while its oceanic waters are included in the marine ecoregion of the Patagonian platform.
