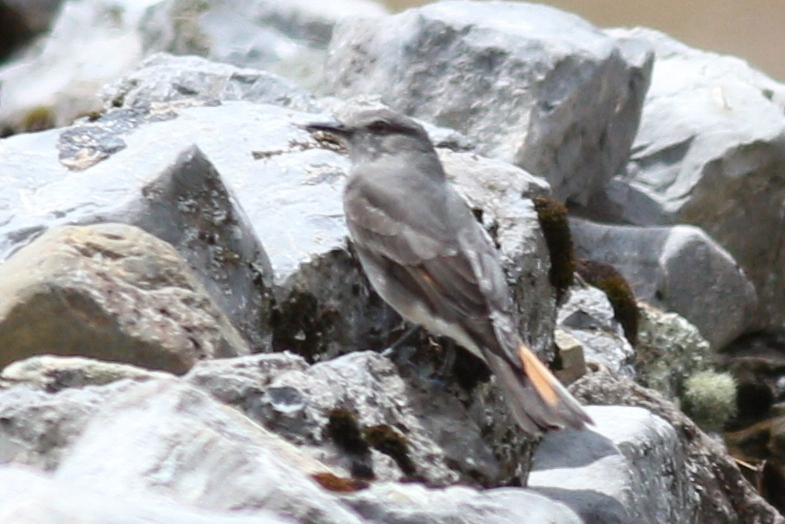

Conservation status
- Least Concern (IUCN 3.1)

Scientific classification
- Kingdom: Animalia
- Phylum: Chordata
- Class: Aves
- Order: Passeriformes
- Family: Tyrannidae
- Genus: Cnemarchus
- Species: C. rufipennis

Binomial name
- Cnemarchus rufipennis (Taczanowski, 1874)

Synonyms
- See text

= Rufous-webbed bush tyrant =

Species of bird

The rufous-webbed bush tyrant (Cnemarchus rufipennis) is a species of bird in the family Tyrannidae, the tyrant flycatchers. It is found in Argentina, Bolivia, Chile, and Peru.

== Taxonomy and systematics ==
The rufous-webbed bush tyrant was formally described in 1874 as Muscisaxicola rufipennis. It was later transferred to genus Cnemarchus that Robert Ridgway had erected in 1905. In the 1970s some authors moved it to genus Myiotheretes. A 1988 paper gave evidence that the species belonged in a new genus Polioxomis. However, a 2009 study hinted and 2020 studies confirmed that it belonged in Cnemarchus. Taxonomic systems began making the change in 2021. However, as of December 2024 BirdLife International's Handbook of the Birds of the World retained the species in Polioxomis.

According to most systems, the rufous-webbed bush tyrant shares genus Cnemarchus with the red-rumped bush tyrant (C. erythropygius). It has two subspecies, the nominate C. r. rufipennis (Taczanowski, 1874) and C. r. bolivianus (Fjeldså, 1990).

== Description ==
The rufous-webbed bush tyrant is 18 to 21.5 cm (7.1 to 8.5 in) long. The sexes have the same plumage. Adults of the nominate subspecies have a pale gray or whitish supercilium and a black line through the eye. Their crown and upperparts are ashy gray. Their wings are ashy gray with cinnamon bases and dark tips on the flight feathers. Most tail feathers have dusky outer webs though the outermost pair is white there. All but the innermost pair have cinnamon inner webs with dusky tips. The wing and tail patterns are obvious in flight. Their chin and throat are very pale gray with faint darker streaks. Their breast is pale gray that becomes whitish on the lower belly and vent area. Juveniles have a strong buff tinge on the breast. Subspecies C. r. bolivianus is slightly smaller and a browner gray than the nominate and has thinner dusky tips on the tail feathers. Both subspecies have a pale iris, a long blackish bill with a hooked tip, and blackish legs and feet.

== Distribution and habitat ==
The rufous-webbed bush tyrant is a bird of the Andes. The nominate subspecies is found from southern Lambayeque, Cajamarca, and Amazonas departments in northern Peru south to Arequipa Department and into far western Bolivia and extreme northern Chile. Subspecies C. r. bolivianus is found from Puno Department in southeastern Peru south through western Bolivia into northwestern Argentina's Jujuy and Salta provinces. The species inhabits semi-arid grasslands with cacti, low-stature woodlands, and scrublands near the tree line, and also Polylepis stands and nearby scrub. It favors areas with boulders and cliffs. It occasionally occurs in farms and gardens if trees are present. In elevation it ranges between 3,100 and 4,600 m (10,200 and 15,100 ft) in Peru and between 3,000 and 4,000 m (9,800 and 13,100 ft) further south.

== Behavior ==
=== Movement ===
The rufous-webbed bush tyrant is a year-round resident.

=== Feeding ===
The rufous-webbed bush tyrant feeds on insects. It usually forages by itself or in pairs and does not join mixed-species feeding flocks. It perches atop a bush, tree, or low cliff and drops to the ground to capture prey, though sometimes it runs after it or takes it in mid-air ("hawking"). It often hovers while seeking prey.

=== Breeding ===
The rufous-webbed bush tyrant's breeding season has not been defined but spans at least December to February in Peru. Males make an aerial display in which they hover and glide about 10 to 12 m (35 to 40 ft) above the ground. The nest is an open cup, typically placed in a Polylepis tree. The clutch size, incubation period, and time to fledging are not known. Both adults provision nestlings but other details of parental care are not known.

=== Vocalization ===
The rufous-webbed bush tyrant sings throughout the day. Its song is "a repeated, high, descending seer note" and its call "a descending, quavering tee'e'ip".

== Status ==
The IUCN has assessed the rufous-webbed bush tyrant as being of Least Concern. It has a large range; its population size is not known and is believed to be decreasing. No immediate threats have been identified. It "[a]ppears to be generally rather rare, though locally fairly common" overall though there are very few records in Chile. It is considered "uncommon but widely distributed" in Peru. The species is found in a few protected areas in Peru and at least one in Bolivia.
