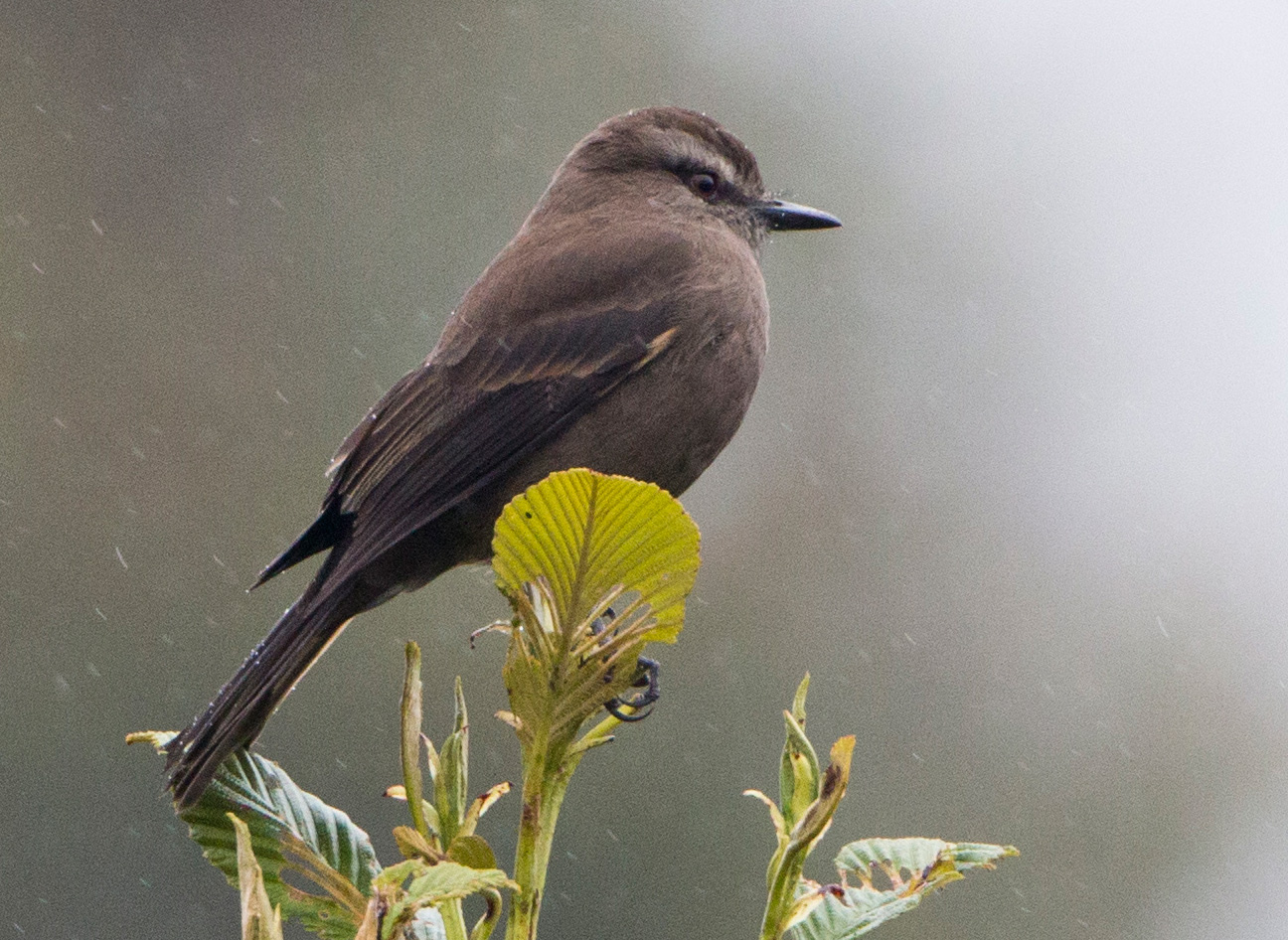

Conservation status
- Least Concern (IUCN 3.1)

Scientific classification
- Kingdom: Animalia
- Phylum: Chordata
- Class: Aves
- Order: Passeriformes
- Family: Tyrannidae
- Genus: Myiotheretes
- Species: M. fumigatus

Binomial name
- Myiotheretes fumigatus (Boissonneau, 1840)

= Smoky bush tyrant =

Species of bird

The smoky bush tyrant (Myiotheretes fumigatus) is a species of bird in the family Tyrannidae, the tyrant flycatchers. It is found in Colombia, Ecuador, Peru and Venezuela.

== Taxonomy and systematics ==
The smoky bush tyrant was formally described in 1840 as Tyrannula fumigata. For a time in the early twentieth century it was placed in genus Ochthodiaeta. That genus was later merged into Xolmis and still later the species was recognized in its present genus Myiotheretes that had been erected in 1850.

The smoky bush tyrant has these four subspecies:

- M. f. olivaceus (Phelps, WH & Phelps, WH Jr, 1953)
- M. f. fumigatus (Boissonneau, 1840)
- M. f. lugubris (Berlepsch, 1883)
- M. f. cajamarcae (Chapman, 1927)

== Description ==
The smoky bush tyrant is 18 to 20.5 cm (7.1 to 8.1 in) long. The sexes have the same plumage, which is somewhat reminiscent of a thrush's. Adults of the nominate subspecies M. f. fumigatus have a thin white supercilium on an otherwise dark smoky brown face. Their upperparts are also dark smoky brown. Their wings are mostly blackish with buffy edges on the coverts and cinnamon bases to the inner webs of the flight feathers; the latter show prominently in flight. Their underwing coverts are cinnamon which also shows in flight. Their tail is mostly blackish with whitish edges on the outer feathers. Their chin and throat are mottled with whitish and dark brown with an ochraceous tinge to the throat. Their underparts are mostly dark smoky brown with dingy buff undertail coverts. Subspecies M. f. olivaceus has a dull grayish white supercilium and a brownish vent area. M. f. lugubris has a smaller supercilium than the nominate and an ochraceous crissum. M. f. cajamarcae is darker overall and has a smaller supercilium than the nominate. All subspecies have a dark iris, a black bill, and black legs and feet.

== Distribution and habitat ==
The smoky bush tyrant has a disjunct distribution though some subspecies' ranges abut. The subspecies are found thus:

- M. f. olivaceus: the Serranía del Perijá straddling the Colombia-Venezuela border and the Andes of western Zulia and southern Táchira states in Venezuela
- M. f. fumigatus: all three Colombian Andes ranges and south into northern Ecuador
- M. f. lugubris: Andes from Trujillo to northern Táchira in western Venezuela
- M. f. cajamarcae: Andes from Cañar Province in southern Ecuador into Peru, on the western slope to Cajamorca Department and on the eastern slope to Cuzco Department

The species is found on both slopes of the Andes in Ecuador and the range of M. f. fumigatus apparently abuts that of M. f. cajamarcae.

The smoky bush tyrant inhabits the interior and edges of humid montane and elfin forest in the upper subtropical and temperate zones. There it mostly occurs from the mid-story to the subcanopy thought it also often occurs on shrubby slopes that have scattered trees. In elevation it ranges between 2,200 and 3,600 m (7,200 and 11,800 ft) in Venezuela, between 2,000 and 3,600 m (6,600 and 11,800 ft) in Colombia, between 2,000 and 3,200 m (6,600 and 10,500 ft) in Ecuador, and between 2,300 and 3,450 m (7,500 and 11,300 ft) in Peru.

== Behavior ==
=== Movement ===
The smoky bush tyrant is a year-round resident.

=== Feeding ===
The smoky bush tyrant feeds on insects. It typically forages singly or in pairs and occasionally joins mixed-species feeding flocks. It perches erect in the subcanopy and captures most prey in mid-air ("hawking") or by hover-gleaning foliage with sallies from the perch. It occasionally will sally to near or even onto the ground.

=== Breeding ===
The smoky bush tyrant's breeding season has not been fully defined. In much of Colombia it includes July and August; in other parts of the country it includes November. Its season in Peru appears to end in January. The one well-studied nest was discovered in October in Ecuador. It was an open cup made mostly from moss and rootlets and lined mostly with tree fern scales. It was about 2 m (7 ft) above the ground nestled in a bed of moss on the side of a stump. It contained two eggs that were white with small brown spots. The eggs hatched six days after discovery; the full incubation period is not known. Fledging occurred 16 to 17 days after hatch. Both members of the pair incubated the clutch and provisioned and brooded the nestlings. A third bird was often present but was not positively identified at the nest itself.

=== Vocalization ===
The smoky bush tyrant's dawn song in Venezuela is described as "a long-sustained but halting [series] of clear, whistled notes, cheea, cheea, cheea, chuEE" or alternated "3- and 4-note phrases, chura, chura, chEEea. chura, chura, chura, cheEEea". It also makes "a soft downslurred whistle, peeeee [and] a soft, 3-noted, slurred whistle, falling then rising". The song in Peru has been described as "a quiet pew followed by a louder PEE'ew" and its calls as "a series of mewing, rich notes wip-wip-wip".

== Status ==
The IUCN has assessed the smoky bush tyrant as being of Least Concern. It has a very large range; its population size is not known and is believed to be decreasing. No immediate threats have been identified. It is considered "uncommon and local" in Venezuela, common in Colombia and Ecuador, and "uncommon" in Peru. It occurs in national parks in every country.
