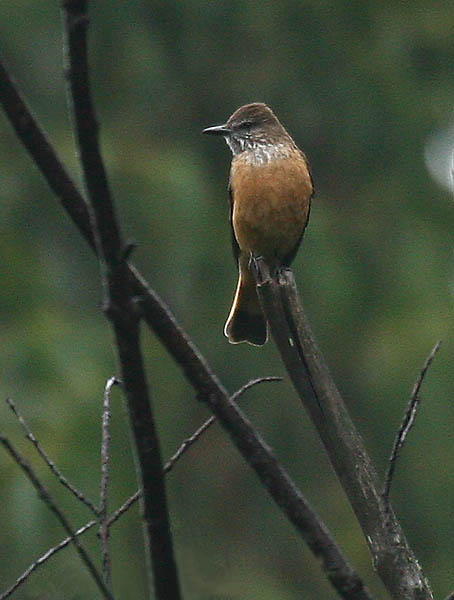

Conservation status
- Least Concern (IUCN 3.1)

Scientific classification
- Kingdom: Animalia
- Phylum: Chordata
- Class: Aves
- Order: Passeriformes
- Family: Tyrannidae
- Genus: Myiotheretes
- Species: M. striaticollis

Binomial name
- Myiotheretes striaticollis (Sclater, PL, 1853)

= Streak-throated bush tyrant =

Species of bird

The streak-throated bush tyrant (Myiotheretes striaticollis) is a species of bird in the family Tyrannidae, the tyrant flycatchers. It is found in Argentina, Bolivia, Colombia, Ecuador, Peru, and Venezuela.

== Taxonomy and systematics ==
The streak-throated bush tyrant was formally described in 1853 as Taenioptera striaticollis. It was later transferred to its present genus Myiotheretes that had been erected in 1850.

The streak-throated bush tyrant has two subspecies, the nominate M. s. striaticollis (Sclater, PL, 1853) and M. s. pallidus (Berlepsch, 1906).

== Description ==
The streak-throated bush tyrant is 21 to 23 cm (8.3 to 9.1 in) long and weighs about 64 g (2.3 oz). The sexes have the same plumage. Adults of the nominate subspecies have a faint whitish stripe from the lores past the eye on an otherwise dark brown face. Their upperparts are a slightly lighter brown. Their wings are mostly dusky with cinnamon-rufous edges and bases to the flight feathers; the latter show as a prominent band in flight. Their tail's upper surface is dusky and its underside cinnamon with a blackish outer third. Their throat is white with heavy black streaks that continue onto the breast. Their upper breast is pale brown and the rest of the underparts cinnamon-rufous. Subspecies M. s. pallidus is smaller and paler than the nominate and has slightly narrower streaks on the throat. Both subspecies have a dark brown iris, a large slightly hooked blackish bill, and blackish legs and feet.

== Distribution and habitat ==
The streak-throated bush tyrant has a disjunct distribution. The nominate subspecies is found separately in the Sierra Nevada de Santa Marta in northern Colombia, the Serranía del Perijá on the Colombia-Venezuela border, and from the Andes of Táchira and Mérida states in western Venezuela south through all three Andean ranges in Colombia, the Andes of Ecuador, and the Andes of Peru south to Apurímac and Arequipa departments. Subspecies M. s. pallidus is found in the Andes from Cuzco and Puno departments in Peru south through Bolivia into northwestern Argentina as far as Tucumán Province.

The streak-throated bush tyrant inhabits a variety of semi-open to open landscapes. These include shrublands and grasslands, agricultural areas with shrubby patches and small woodlands, and the edges of more extensive forest and woodlands typically near cliffs, landslide scars, and roads. It shuns the interior of large forest. In elevation it ranges between 2,100 and 3,100 m (6,900 and 10,200 ft) (and probably higher) in Venezuela, between 2,400 and 3,400 m (7,900 and 11,200 ft) in Colombia, mostly between 2,400 and 3,200 m (7,900 and 10,500 ft) in Ecuador, and mostly between 1,700 and 3,700 m (5,600 and 12,100 ft) but as low as 500 m (1,600 ft) in Peru.

== Behavior ==
=== Movement ===
The streak-throated bush tyrant is primarily a year-round resident though some seasonal elevational changes are believed likely in Venezuela.

=== Feeding ===
The streak-throated bush tyrant feeds on insects and small vertebrates. It typically forages singly or in pairs, though members of pairs often are somewhat separated. It perches high in an exposed position and captures most prey in mid-air ("hawking") with sallies that often take it back to the same perch. It takes other prey by dropping onto it on the ground.

=== Breeding ===
The streak-throated bush tyrant's breeding season has not been fully defined. It spans from January to June in the Sierra Nevada de Santa Marta and Serranía del Perijá and includes March elsewhere in Venezuela. Its nest is an open cup often placed under a bridge or a natural or human-made overhang. Nothing else is known about the species' breeding biology.

=== Vocalization ===
The streak-throated bush tyrant's calls have been described as "a loud, clear whistle, peeeeee" that rises and is "unmistakably human in quality", "a strident, whistled stee-deek!", and "2-4 loud humanlike whistles...püEEET,,wuuu..eee [or] püEEET..wuEET..sueet..peeu". The vocalizations have also been described as "a loud descending whistled HEEW or HEEE'wit [and] a squeaky seebit".

== Status ==
The IUCN has assessed the streak-throated bush tyrant as being of Least Concern. It has a very large range; its population size is not known and is believed to be stable. No immediate threats have been identified. It is considered uncommon in Venezuela, common in Colombia, and "uncommon but widespread" in Peru. It occurs in protected areas in most countries and "given its tolerance of converted habitat...it is not threatened".
