= Lepidophyllum =

Scientific classification
- Kingdom: Plantae
- Clade: Tracheophytes
- Clade: Angiosperms
- Clade: Eudicots
- Clade: Asterids
- Order: Asterales
- Family: Asteraceae
- Subfamily: Asteroideae
- Tribe: Astereae
- Subtribe: Chiliotrichinae
- Genus: Lepidophyllum; Cass. 1816 not Trinajstić 1990 (syn of Phyllolepidum in Brassicaceae)
- Species: L. cupressiforme

Binomial name
- Lepidophyllum cupressiforme Cass.

Synonyms
- Genus: Brachyridium Meisn.; Species: Athanasia cupressiformis Comm. ex DC.; Baccharis cupressiformis (Lam.) Pers.; Brachyridium cupressiforme (Cass.) Meisn.; Conyza cupressifomis Lam.; Gutierrezia cupressiformis (Lam.) Sch.Bip.

Genus of flowering plants

Lepidophyllum is a genus of South American flowering plants in the family Asteraceae.

Species

There is only one accepted species, Lepidophyllum cupressiforme, native to southern Argentina (Santa Cruz and Tierra del Fuego Provinces) and southern Chile (Magallanes Region).
