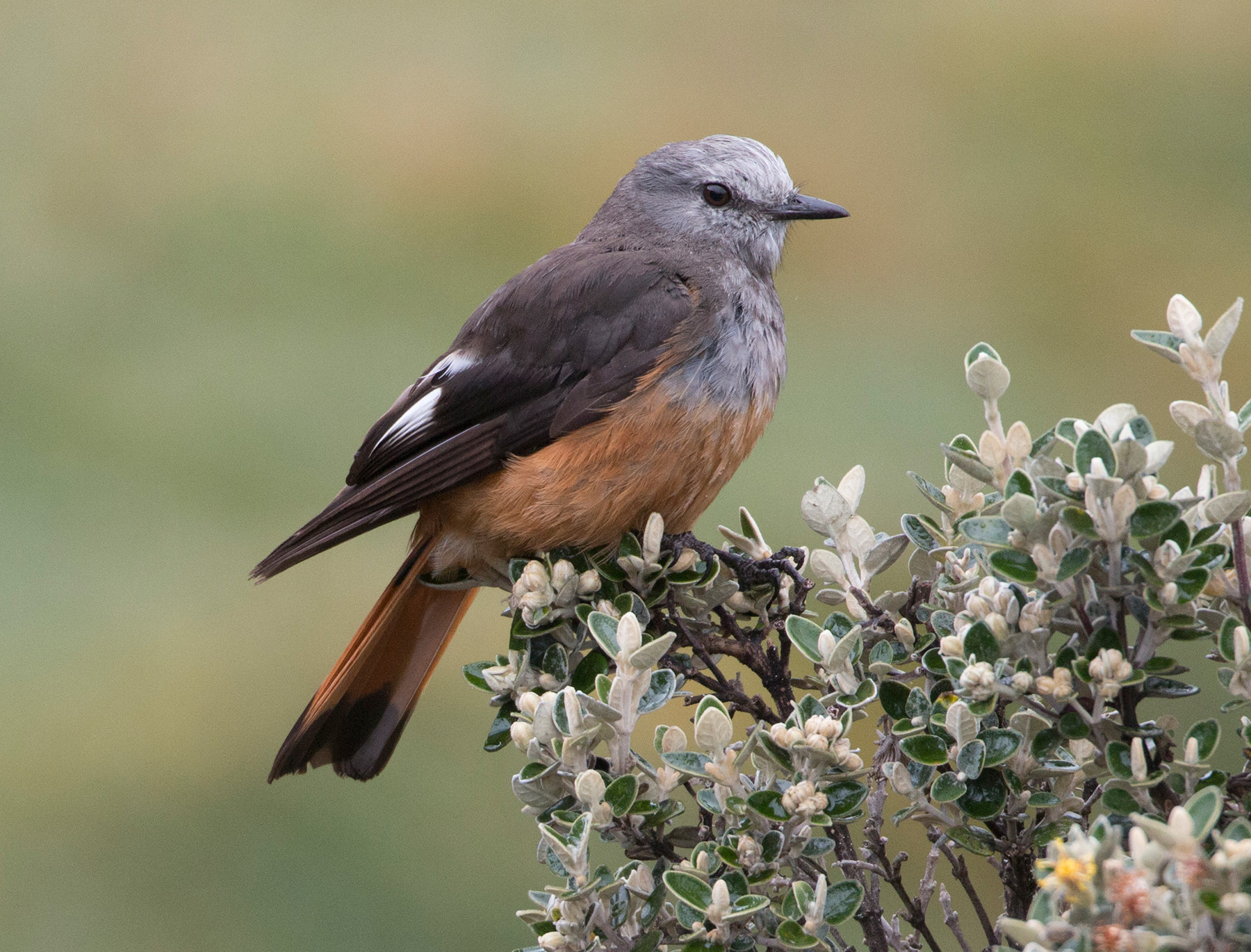
- Red-rumped bush tyrant (Cnemarchus erythropygius)

Scientific classification
- Kingdom: Animalia
- Phylum: Chordata
- Class: Aves
- Order: Passeriformes
- Family: Tyrannidae
- Genus: Cnemarchus; Ridgway, 1905

Type species
- Taenioptera erythropygia red-rumped bush tyrant Sclater, 1853

= Cnemarchus =

Genus of birds

Cnemarchus is a genus of South American birds in the tyrant flycatcher family Tyrannidae.

The two member of this genus are elongated, upright-perching flycatchers that share similar tail patterns. They are found at high-altitudes.

== Taxonomy ==
The genus Cnemarchus was introduced in 1905 by the American ornithologist Robert Ridgway with the red-rumped bush tyrant as the type species. The name combines the Ancient Greek knēmos meaning "mountain-slope" with arkhos meaning "ruler" or "chief".

This genus formerly contained only the red-rumped bush tyrant. Molecular phylogenetic studies published in 2020 found that the red-rumped bush tyrant was a sister to the rufous-webbed bush tyrant in the monotypic genus Polioxolmis. The two species had diverged around 4.5 million years ago. Based on these results, the genus Polioxolmis was merged into Cnemarchus placing both species in the genus Cnemarchus.

The genus therefore contains the following two species:

- Red-rumped bush tyrant (Cnemarchus erythropygius)
- Rufous-webbed bush tyrant (Cnemarchus rufipennis)
