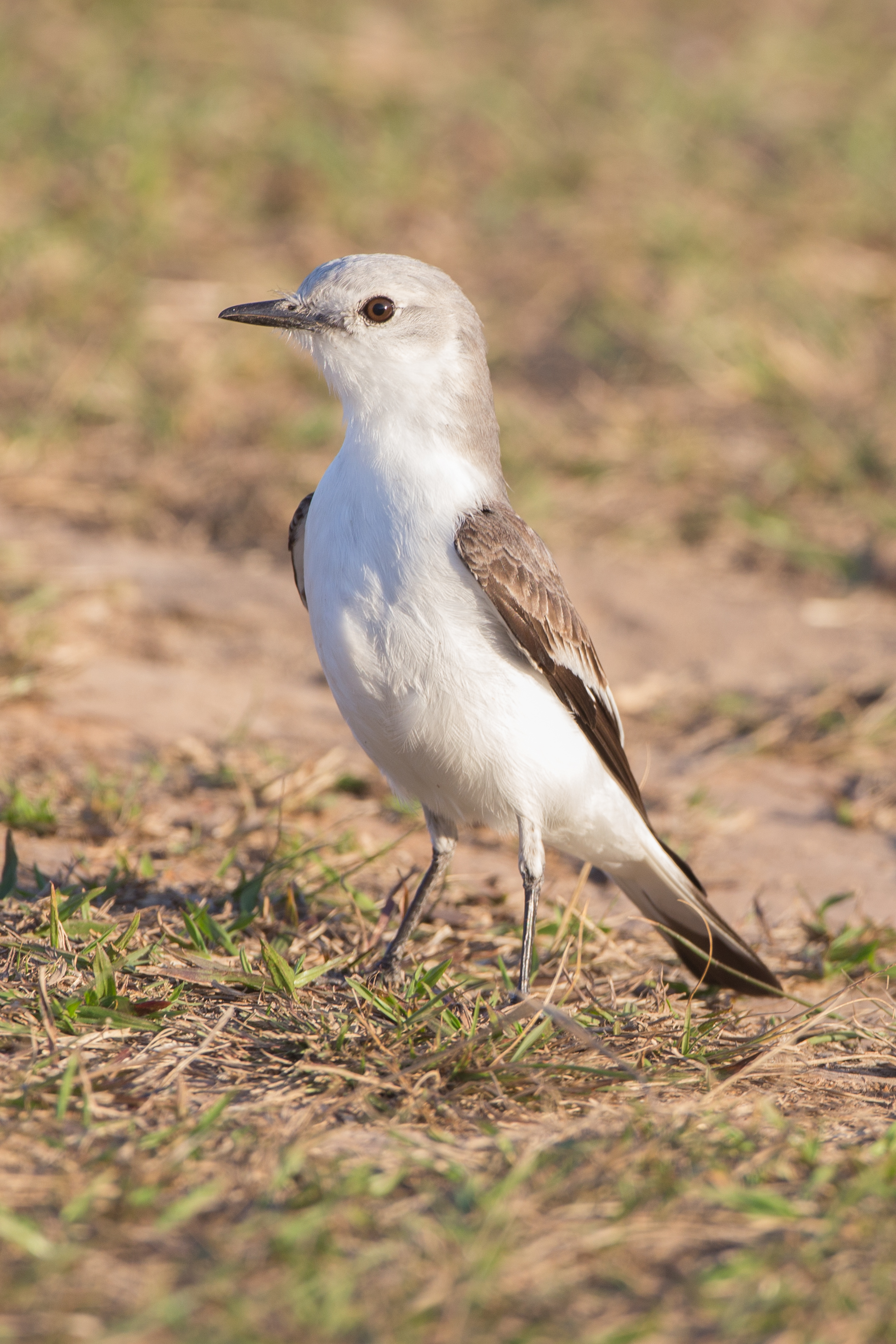

Conservation status
- Least Concern (IUCN 3.1)

Scientific classification
- Kingdom: Animalia
- Phylum: Chordata
- Class: Aves
- Order: Passeriformes
- Family: Tyrannidae
- Genus: Xolmis
- Species: X. velatus

Binomial name
- Xolmis velatus (Lichtenstein, MHC, 1823)

= White-rumped monjita =

Species of bird

The white-rumped monjita (Xolmis velatus) is a species of bird in the family Tyrannidae, the tyrant flycatchers. It is found in Bolivia, Brazil, Paraguay, and as a vagrant to Argentina.

== Taxonomy and systematics ==
The white-rumped monjita was formally described in 1823 as Muscicapa velata, a member of the Old World flycatcher family. It was eventually transferred to genus Xolmis that had been erected in 1826. Because Xolmis is masculine, it was necessary to change the ending of the specific epithet to velatus.

According to the IOC, the South American Classification Committee of the American Ornithological Society (SACC), and the Clements taxonomy, the white-rumped monjita shares genus Xolmis with only the white monjita (X. irupero). However, as of December 2024 BirdLife International's Handbook of the Birds of the World includes six other species in addition to the white-rumped and white monjitas. All agree that the white-rumped monjita is monotypic.

== Description ==
The white-rumped monjita is 19 to 20 cm (7.5 to 7.9 in) long. The sexes have the same plumage. Adults have a mostly white head with a pearly gray nape. Their upperparts are mostly brownish gray with a white rump. The basal half of their tail is white and the rest black. Their wings are blackish with a white band at the base of the flight feathers that shows as a stripe in flight. Their inner secondaries and tertials also have a white patch. Their underparts are entirely white. They have a dark iris, a black bill, and dusky blackish legs and feet.

== Distribution and habitat ==
The white-rumped monjita is found in Brazil from the lower Amazon River in Pará and Maranhão south to Paraná and occasionally beyond, and west to southern Mato Grosso and Mato Grosso do Sul. Its range continues into northern and central Bolivia and northeastern Paraguay. The SACC also has records of it as a vagrant in northern Argentina. The white-rumped monjita inhabits open and semi-open landscapes such as savanna and grasslands with some bushes and trees, and is usually found near water. It often occurs around isolated human dwellings and on the outskirts of towns. In elevation it ranges up to about 1,000 m (3,300 ft).

== Behavior ==
=== Feeding ===
The white-rumped monjita feeds on insects, though details are lacking. It usually forages in pairs, perching somewhat tamely in the open on fence posts, wires, and bushes. It drops from the perch to the ground to capture prey and also hovers before dropping.

=== Breeding ===
The white-rumped monjita has a breeding season that primarily takes place in August through November, although breeding has been observed starting as early as June and ending as late as January. It exhibits biparental care, and parents feed young a diet of insects, spiders, earthworms, and even lizards. Parents build nests in August, lay their eggs in September, and fledge their young in November.

Nesting seems to take place low to the ground (not higher that 4 metres) and consists of a cup nest lined with feathers, into which 2-4 eggs are laid. They are a diverse cavity nester, and have been seen nesting in trees/fence posts, termite mounds, roofs, and pvc pipes. Parents are highly territorial of their nest and will attack other bird species when they get too close.

=== Vocalization ===
The white-rumped monjita is not highly vocal. Its song is a "nasal, downslurred njeh, repeated at 1-sec intervals". It sometimes gives a single whistle at night.

== Status ==
The IUCN has assessed the white-rumped monjita as being of Least Concern. It has a very large range; its population size is not known and is believed to be stable. No immediate threats have been identified. It is considered fairly common and occurs in many national parks and other protected areas. It is a synanthrope, and will regularly nest in houses and fence posts, meaning its population has been less affected by human development than other similar species.
