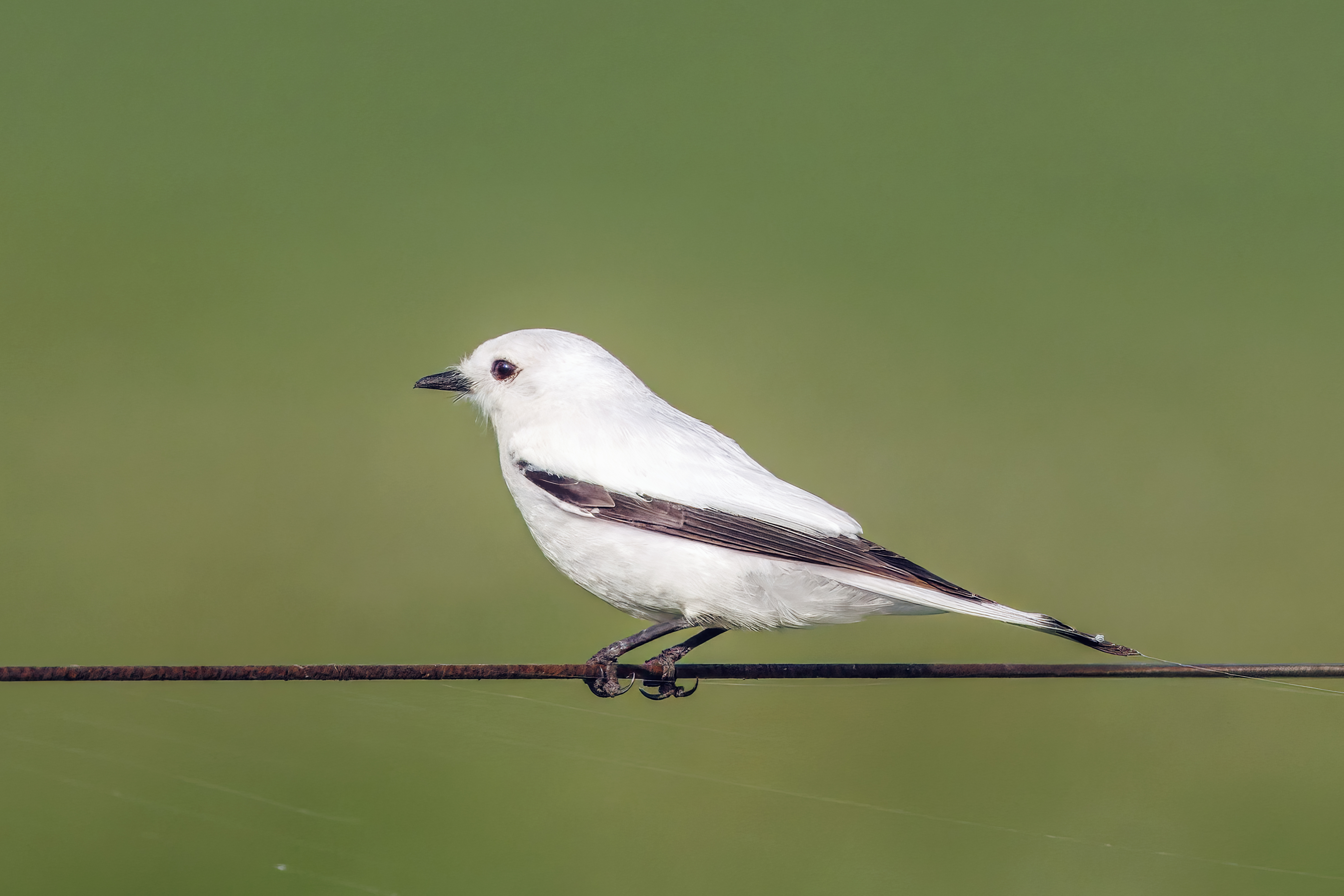
- in Colonia Province, Uruguay

Conservation status
- Least Concern (IUCN 3.1)

Scientific classification
- Kingdom: Animalia
- Phylum: Chordata
- Class: Aves
- Order: Passeriformes
- Family: Tyrannidae
- Genus: Xolmis
- Species: X. irupero

Binomial name
- Xolmis irupero (Vieillot, 1823)

= White monjita =

Species of bird

The white monjita (Xolmis irupero) is a species of bird in the family Tyrannidae, the tyrant flycatchers. It is found in Argentina, Bolivia, Brazil, Paraguay, and Uruguay.

== Taxonomy and systematics ==
The white monjita was formally described in 1823 as Tyrannus irupero. It was eventually transferred to genus Xolmis that had been erected in 1826.

According to the IOC, the South American Classification Committee of the American Ornithological Society (SACC), and the Clements taxonomy, the white monjita shares genus Xolmis with only the white-rumped monjita (X. velatus). However, as of December 2024 BirdLife International's Handbook of the Birds of the World includes six other species in addition to the white and white-rumped monjitas. All agree that the white monjita has two subspecies, the nominate X. i. irupero (Vieillot, 1823) and X. i. niveus (Spix, 1825).

== Description ==
The white monjita is 17 to 18 cm (6.7 to 7.1 in) long and weighs 21 to 29.5 g (0.74 to 1.0 oz). Adult males of the nominate subspecies are almost entirely white. They have black primaries, primary coverts, and tail tip. Females are almost identical but have a gray tinge on their back. Subspecies X. i. niveus is slightly smaller than the nominate and has a wider black band on the tail. Both sexes of both subspecies have a dark brown iris, a black bill, and black legs and feet.

== Distribution and habitat ==
The white monjita has a disjunct distribution. The nominate subspecies has by far the larger range of the two. It is found from central Bolivia south through southeastern Bolivia, Paraguay, and western Mato Grosso do Sul in Brazil and through Brazil's Rio Grande do Sul, Uruguay, and Argentina as far as Río Negro Province. Subspecies X. i. niveus is found in northeastern Brazil from Ceará and Rio Grande do Norte south to Minas Gerais and Espírito Santo. The species inhabits open and semi-open landscapes such as savanna, grasslands, and pastures with some bushes and trees, and is usually found near marshes or water. It often occurs around isolated human dwellings and along roads. In most areas it reaches an elevation of about 1,000 m (3,300 ft) but in Bolivia reaches 1,300 m (4,300 ft).

== Behavior ==
=== Movement ===
Sources differ on the white monjita's movements. The IOC, Clements, and Birds of the World call it a year-round resident. The IUCN places it as breeding but not wintering in Uruguay and as a resident elsewhere. The SACC states it does not breed in Bolivia; it does not distinguish between breeding-only and resident elsewhere.

=== Feeding ===
The white monjita feeds on insects. It usually perches very visibly in the open on treetops, wires, and bushes but moves into dense vegetation if threatened. It drops from the perch to the ground to capture prey and also sometimes hovers before dropping.

=== Breeding ===
The white monjita breeds between September and December in Argentina and its season appears to span at least from August to November in Uruguay. Its nest is an open cup made from grass and twigs lined with feathers and soft fibers. It is placed in a hollow in a tree and sometimes in the abandoned nest of a furnariid ovenbird. The clutch is three to four eggs. The incubation period is about 12 days and fledging occurs about 17 days after hatch. Shiny cowbirds (Molothrus bonariensis) are known to parisitize the nest.

=== Vocalization ===
The white monjita is not highly vocal. The male's dawn song is a "soft, repeated preeeyp tooit preeeyp tooit". The species also gives "weak ghiks" and "a whining piew".

== Status ==
The IUCN has assessed the white monjita as being of Least Concern. It has a very large range; its population size is not known and is believed to be stable. No immediate threats have been identified. Subspecies X. i. niveus is considered rare. The nominate subspecies is considered fairly common to common. Both subspecies are found in national parks and other protected areas.
