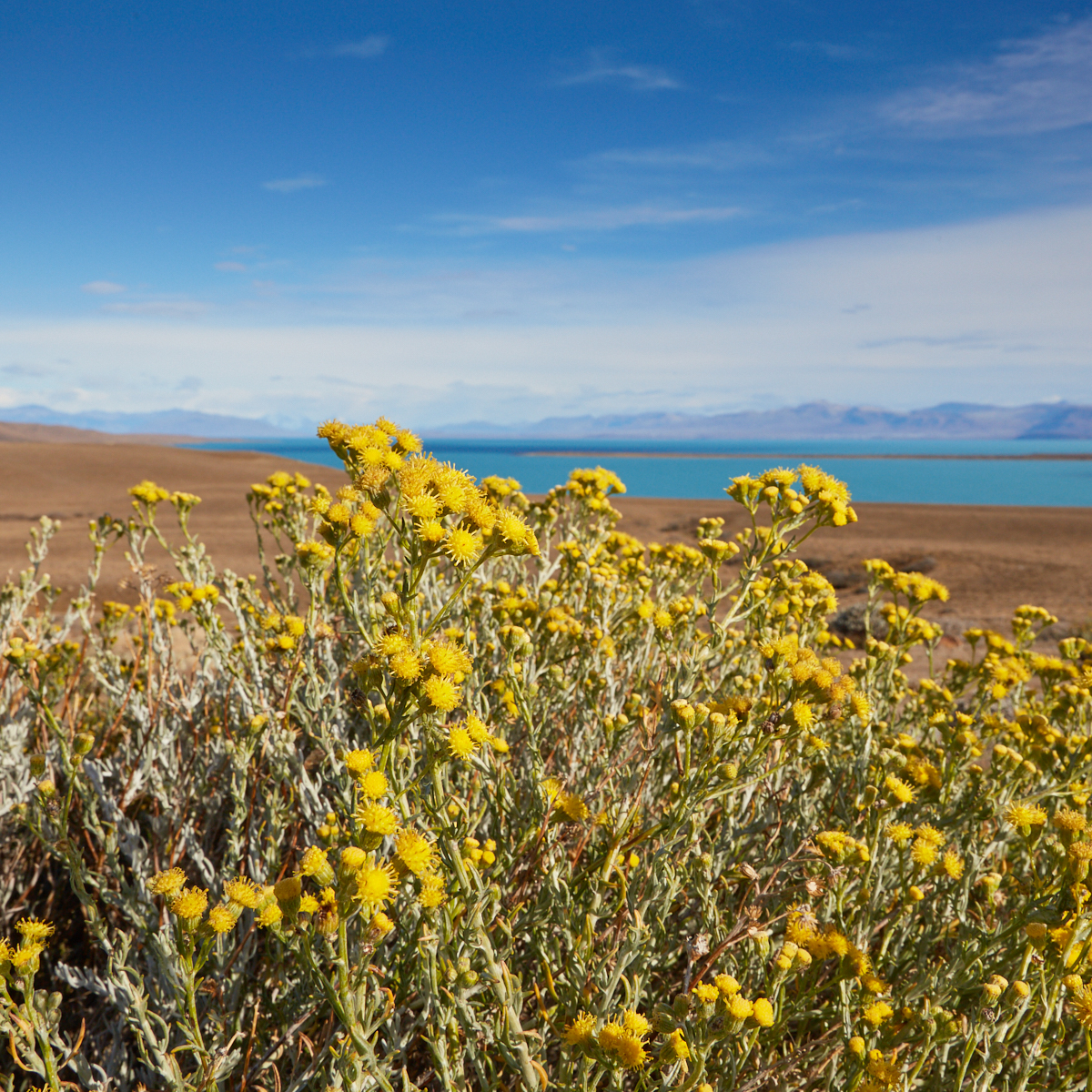

Scientific classification
- Kingdom: Plantae
- Clade: Tracheophytes
- Clade: Angiosperms
- Clade: Eudicots
- Clade: Asterids
- Order: Asterales
- Family: Asteraceae
- Genus: Senecio
- Species: S. patagonicus

Binomial name
- Senecio patagonicus Phil.

= Senecio patagonicus =

Species of flowering plant

Senecio patagonicus is an arid land perennial Senecio native to high elevation steppe ecosystems of Patagonia in Argentina and Chile.
