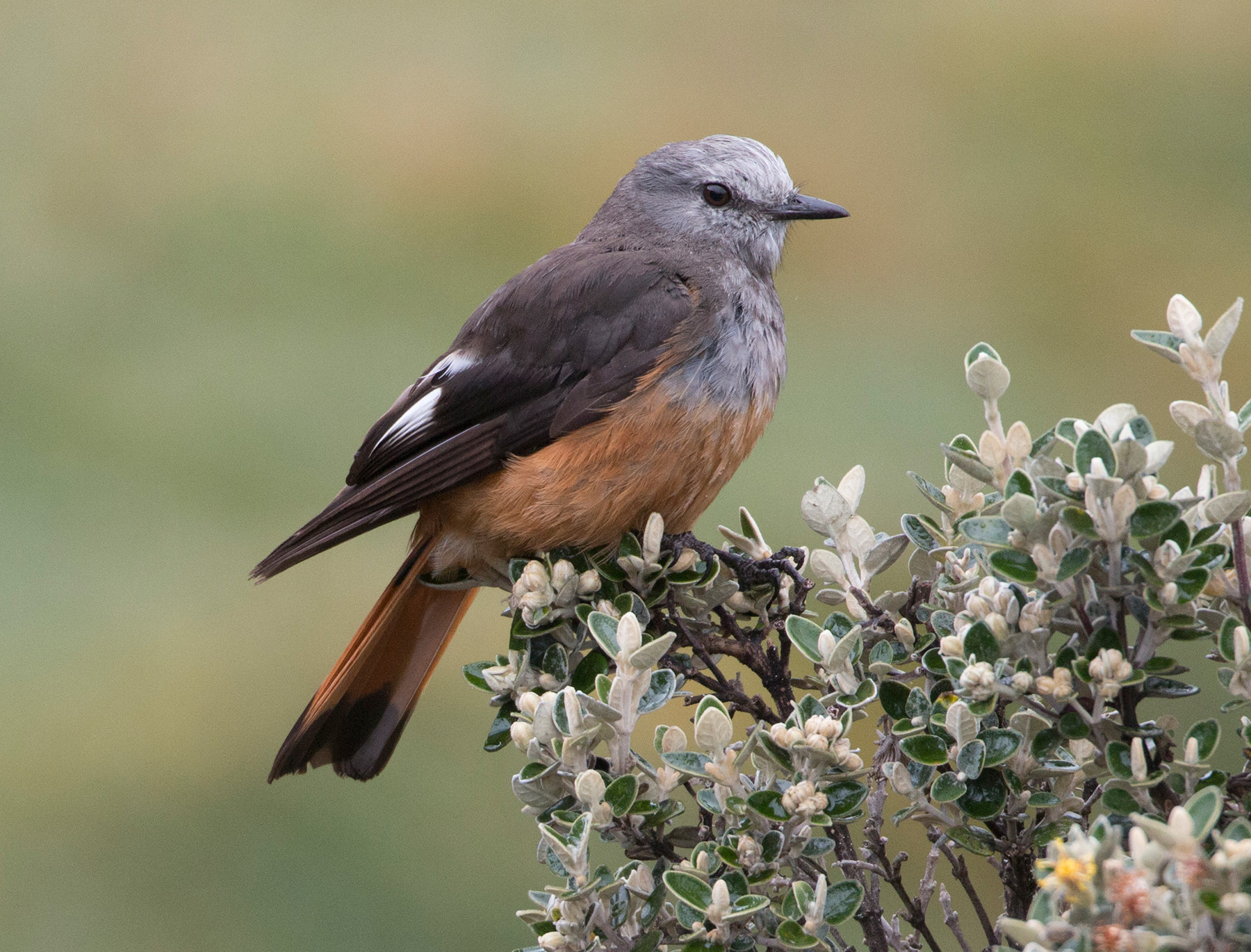
- Cajas National Park, Ecuador

Conservation status
- Least Concern (IUCN 3.1)

Scientific classification
- Kingdom: Animalia
- Phylum: Chordata
- Class: Aves
- Order: Passeriformes
- Family: Tyrannidae
- Genus: Cnemarchus
- Species: C. erythropygius

Binomial name
- Cnemarchus erythropygius (Sclater, PL, 1853)

Synonyms
- See text

= Red-rumped bush tyrant =

Species of bird

The red-rumped bush tyrant (Cnemarchus erythropygius) is a species of bird in the family Tyrannidae, the tyrant flycatchers. It is found in Bolivia, Colombia, Ecuador, and Peru.

== Taxonomy and systematics ==
The red-rumped bush tyrant was formally described in 1853 as Taenioptera erythropygia. In 1905 Robert Ridgway erected genus Cnemarchus and transferred erythropygia to it as the type specimen. It was necessary to change the specific epithet's ending to match the masculine gender of the new genus. In the 1970s some authors moved it to genus Myiotheretes; Ridgway had noted the similarity of his new Cnemarchus to that genus. A 1988 paper gave evidence that the species belonged to Cnemarchus and a 2009 study confirmed it.

The red-rumped bush tyrant shares genus Cnemarchus with the rufous-webbed bush tyrant (C. rufipennis). It has two subspecies, the nominate C. e. erythropygius (Sclater, PL, 1853) and C. e. orinomus (Wetmore, 1946).

== Description ==
The red-rumped bush tyrant is 20 to 23 cm (7.9 to 9.1 in) long. One female weighed 50 g (1.8 oz). The sexes have the same plumage. Adults of the nominate subspecies have a white forecrown that becomes a hoary gray crown. Their back is dark gray brown and their rump is rufous. Their wings are dark gray brown with much white on the tertials that shows as a conspicuous patch in flight. Their central tail feathers are blackish and the rest are rufous with blackish end quarters. Their chin and throat are white with thin dusky streaks. Their breast is gray that becomes rufous on the belly and undertail coverts. Subspecies C. e. orinomus has a grayer back than the nominate with a brown rump. Their tail feathers have less black on the tips and their belly is paler than the nominate's. Both subspecies have a brown iris, a black bill, and black legs and feet.

== Distribution and habitat ==
The red-rumped bush tyrant has a disjunct distribution, mostly in the Andes. The nominate subspecies is found from Nariño Department in southwestern Colombia south through Ecuador and Peru into Bolivia to Cochabamba Department. Subspecies C. e. orinomus is found in Colombia, in the isolated Sierra Nevada de Santa Marta in the north and in the Eastern Andes of Norte de Santander and Cundinamarca departments. The red-rumped bush tyrant inhabits the grassy and shrubby paramo biome and Polylepis groves. In elevation it ranges between 3,100 and 4,000 m (10,200 and 13,100 ft) in Colombia, 2,850 and 4,100 m (9,400 and 13,500 ft) in Ecuador, 3,000 and 4,300 m (9,800 and 14,100 ft) in Peru, and 3,100 and 4,300 m (10,200 and 14,100 ft) in Bolivia.

== Behavior ==
=== Movement ===
The red-rumped bush tyrant is a year-round resident.

=== Feeding ===
The red-rumped bush tyrant feeds on insects, though details are lacking. It usually forages by itself or in pairs and does not join mixed-species feeding flocks. It perches atop a bush, tree, or fence post and drops to the ground to capture prey, though sometimes it takes it in mid-air ("hawking").

=== Breeding ===
The red-rumped bush tyrant's breeding season has not been defined but includes November in Peru and March and September in the Sierra Nevada de Santa Marta. Nothing else is known about the species' breeding biology.

=== Vocalization ===
The red-rumped bush tyrant is not highly vocal. What is believed to be its song is "a rather unpatterned series of mellow mewed whistles and rich churring notes". Some calls are a "loud, piercing, clear TEEER!, PEEP, pee-ip, and tew notes and burrier dzeeer and djip notes". Other calls are described as "a shrill kyeee", "a higher-pitched skyeik", and "a high-pitched plaintive whistle, wheeeu".

== Status ==
The IUCN has assessed the red-rumped bush tyrant as being of Least Concern. It has a large range; its population size is not known and is believed to be stable. No immediate threats have been identified. It is considered "very local" in Colombia, "found at low densities" in Ecuador, and "rare" in Peru. "Human activity has little short-term direct effect on Red-rumped Bush-Tyrant, other than the local effects of habitat destruction."
