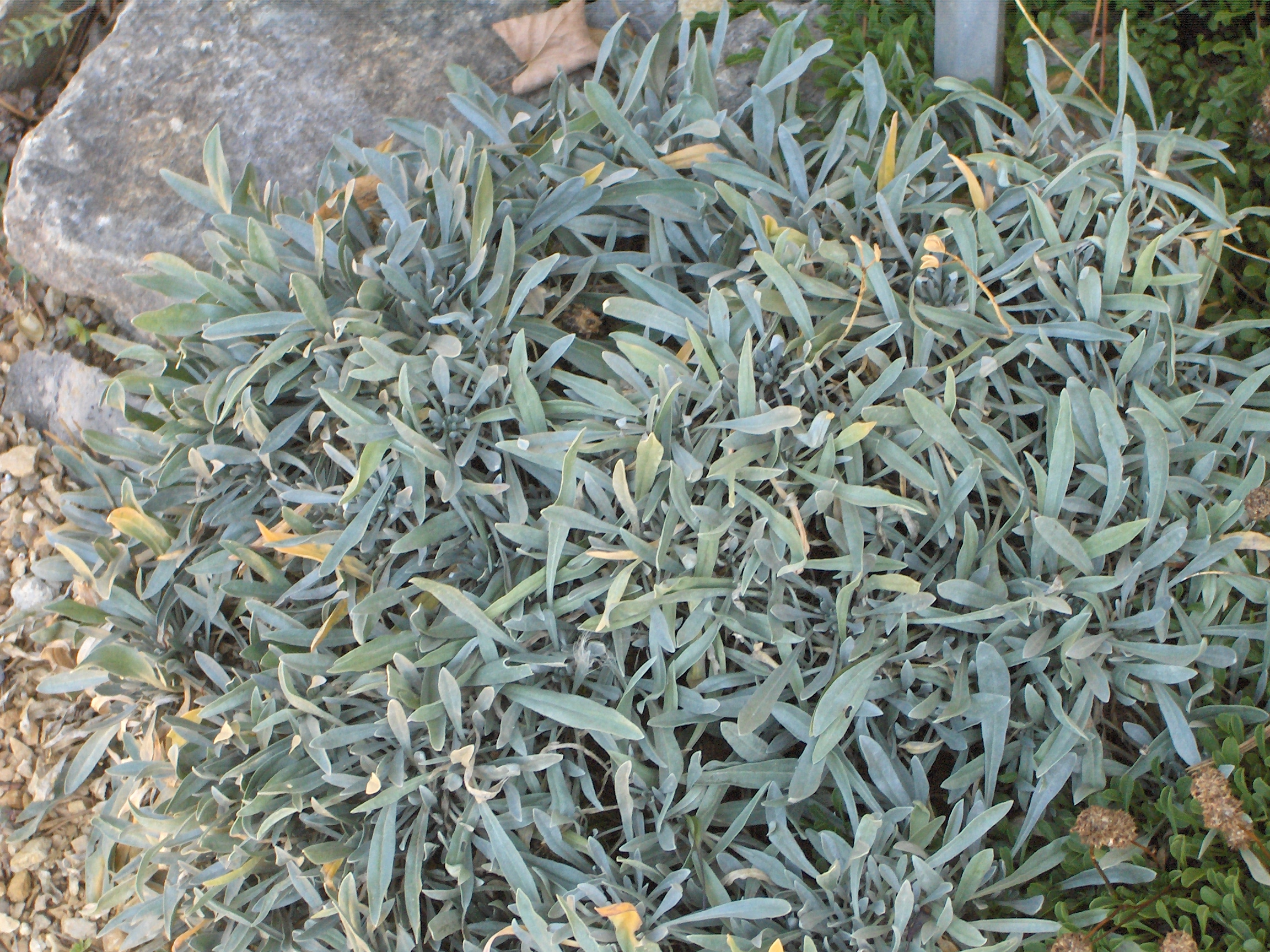

Scientific classification
- Kingdom: Plantae
- Clade: Tracheophytes
- Clade: Angiosperms
- Clade: Eudicots
- Clade: Rosids
- Order: Brassicales
- Family: Brassicaceae
- Genus: Phyllolepidum; Trinajstić
- Species: P. cyclocarpum

Binomial name
- Phyllolepidum cyclocarpum (Boiss.) L.Cecchi

Subspecies
- Phyllolepidum cyclocarpum subsp. cyclocarpum; Phyllolepidum cyclocarpum subsp. pindicum (Hartvig) L.Cecchi

Synonyms
- Lepidophyllum Trinajstić; Aurinia cyclocarpa (Boiss.) Czerep.; Aurinia rupestris subsp. cyclocarpa (Boiss.) Cullen & T.R.Dudley; Ptilotrichum cyclocarpum Boiss.

= Phyllolepidum =

Genus of plants

Phyllolepidum is a genus of flowering plants belonging to the family Brassicaceae, native to Italy, the Balkans and Turkey. It includes either a single species, Phyllolepidum cyclocarpum, a subshrub with two subspecies, or two separate species, P. cyclocarpum and P. rupestre.

The species has a disjunct distribution in the Maiella massif and nearby mountains of the Central Apennines of Italy, in the mountains of North Macedonia, southern Albania, northern and central Greece, and in the Taurus Mountains of Anatolia and Turkish Kurdistan

== Subspecies ==
Plants of the World Online accepts two subspecies.

- Phyllolepidum cyclocarpum subsp. cyclocarpum – southwestern Serbia to Albania, Greece, and Turkey
- Phyllolepidum cyclocarpum subsp. pindicum (Hartvig) L.Cecchi (synonym Ptilotrichum rupestre (Sweet) Boiss.) – central Italy, former Yugoslavia, Albania, and Greece
