= Magallanes National Reserve =

Protected area in Chile

- IUCN category IV (habitat/species management area)
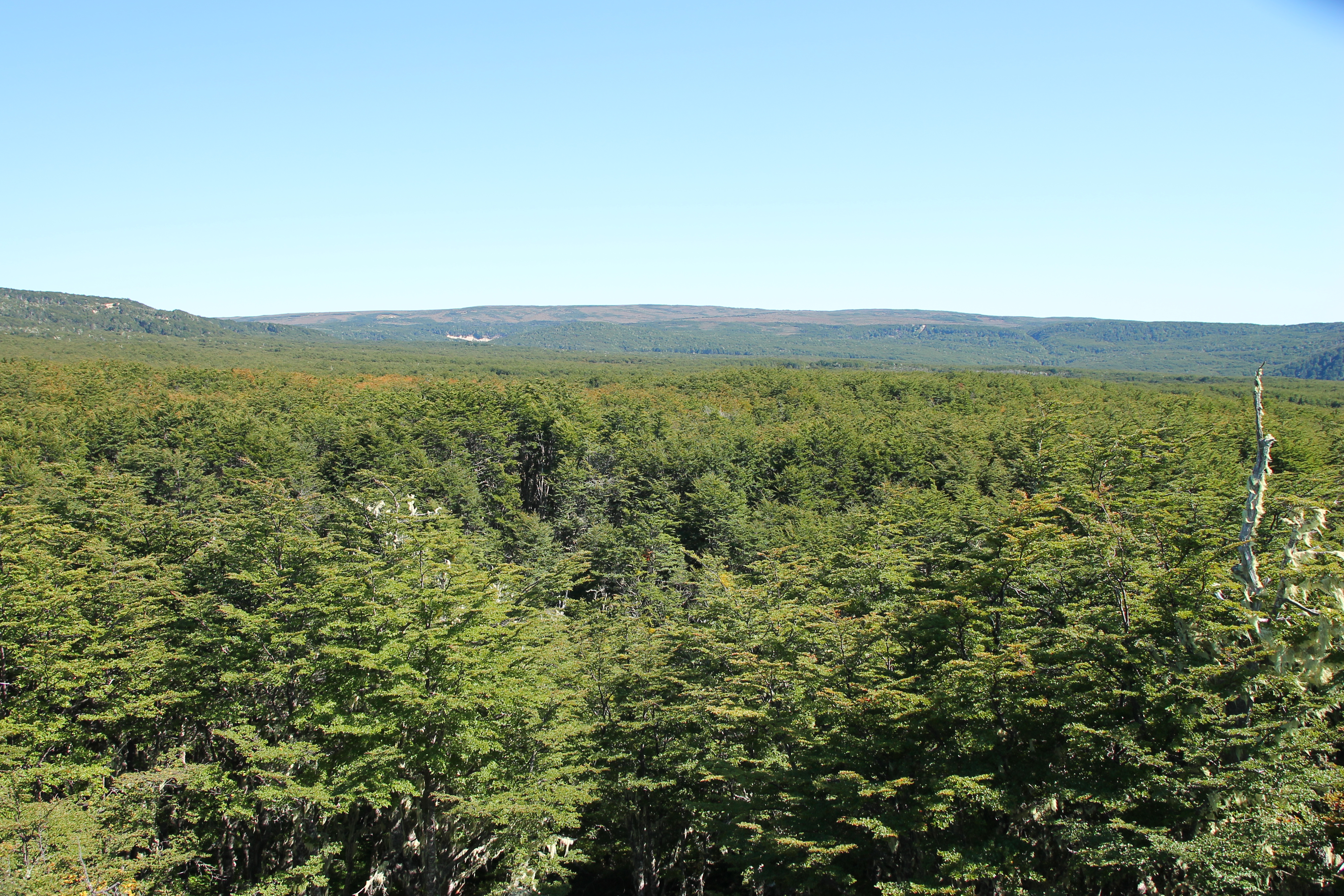
- View of the reserve from Zapador Austral
- Interactive map of Magallanes National Reserve
- Location: Magallanes and Antártica Chilena Region, Chile
- Coordinates: 53.1461°S 71.0032°W
- Area: 20,878 ha (51,591 acres)
- Established: February 13, 1932
- Visitors: 16,438 (in 2016)
- Governing body: Corporación Nacional Forestal

Magallanes National Reserve (Spanish: Reserva Nacional Magallanes) is a national reserve in southern Chile's Magallanes and Antártica Chilena Region. The reserve lies 5 km west of the city Punta Arenas. It was created on February 13, 1932 to saveguard the city's primary source of drinking water, the Lynch Lagoon watershed. In 1939, the reserve was expanded to its current size of 20,878 hectares. It is managed by the National Forestry Corporation (CONAF).

== Fauna ==
The reserve's forest and shrubland are home to 18 species of mammals including the puma, Darwin's leaf-eared mouse, culpeo and South American grey fox. In the summer of 2023, researchers recorded a pair of huemuls (south andean deer) in the reserve its first sighting here in 91 years.

Over 75 species of birds have been oberserved in the reserve, some of the most iconic and prominent species are the Magellanic woodpecker, Lesser Horned owl, austral pygme owl, ringed kingfisher, white throated treerunner, Magellanic tapaculo, austral parakeet and black chested buzzard eagle.

== Flora ==
This reserve is covered in abundant vegetation, with native Nothofagus trees like Lengas and Coigües. Common shrubs include calafate, romerillo, michay, and wild currant (zarzaparrilla). In addition, nearly 200 species of herbs and flowering plants bloom throughout the reserve during the spring, creating colorful displays.

== Climate ==
The reserve sits in a transition zone where the cold steppe and trans-Andean climates meet, bringing mostly dry weather broken up by distinct wet seasons and harsh, snowy winters.

Temperatures average around 7 °C (44.6 °F) throughout the year. July is the coldest stretch, with averages dropping to 2.5 °C (36.5 °F), while January stands out as the warmest month at a mild 11.7 °C (53.1 °F).

The area receives between 450 and 650 mm of precipitation annually, though this can skyrocket to 2,000 mm out in the peatlands.

== Facilities ==
The reserve features an information center, where visitors can learn about the protected area through photographs, displays, and a scale model. There are approximately 60 km of trails, including 16 km of hiking trails, with the longest being the Las Lengas Circuit, measuring 9.8 km. The park also has 14 km of mountain biking trails.
