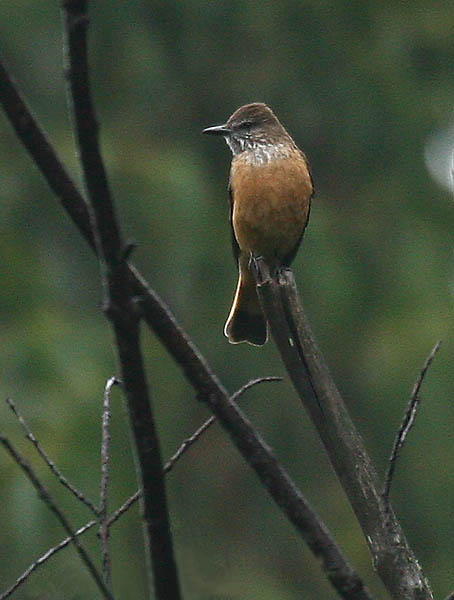
- Streak-throated bush tyrant (Myiotheretes striaticollis)

Scientific classification
- Kingdom: Animalia
- Phylum: Chordata
- Class: Aves
- Order: Passeriformes
- Family: Tyrannidae
- Genus: Myiotheretes; Reichenbach, 1850

Type species
- Tyrannus rufiventris d'Orbigny & Lafresnaye, 1837

= Myiotheretes =

Genus of birds

Myiotheretes is a genus of South American birds in the tyrant flycatcher family Tyrannidae. These superficially thrush-like birds are large tyrants (19–24 cm/7.5-9.5 in long) of the Andean highlands. The red-rumped bush tyrant is considered closely related.

== Species ==
The genus contains the following four species:

| Image | Common name | Scientific name | Distribution |
|---|---|---|---|
| | Streak-throated bush tyrant | Myiotheretes striaticollis | Andes of Colombia to northwestern Argentina. |
| | Rufous-bellied bush tyrant | Myiotheretes fuscorufus | eastern Andes of Peru and Bolivia. |
| | Santa Marta bush tyrant | Myiotheretes pernix | Sierra Nevada de Santa Marta of Caribbean northern Colombia. |
| | Smoky bush tyrant | Myiotheretes fumigatus | northern Andes of Colombia, Ecuador, Peru and Venezuela. |
