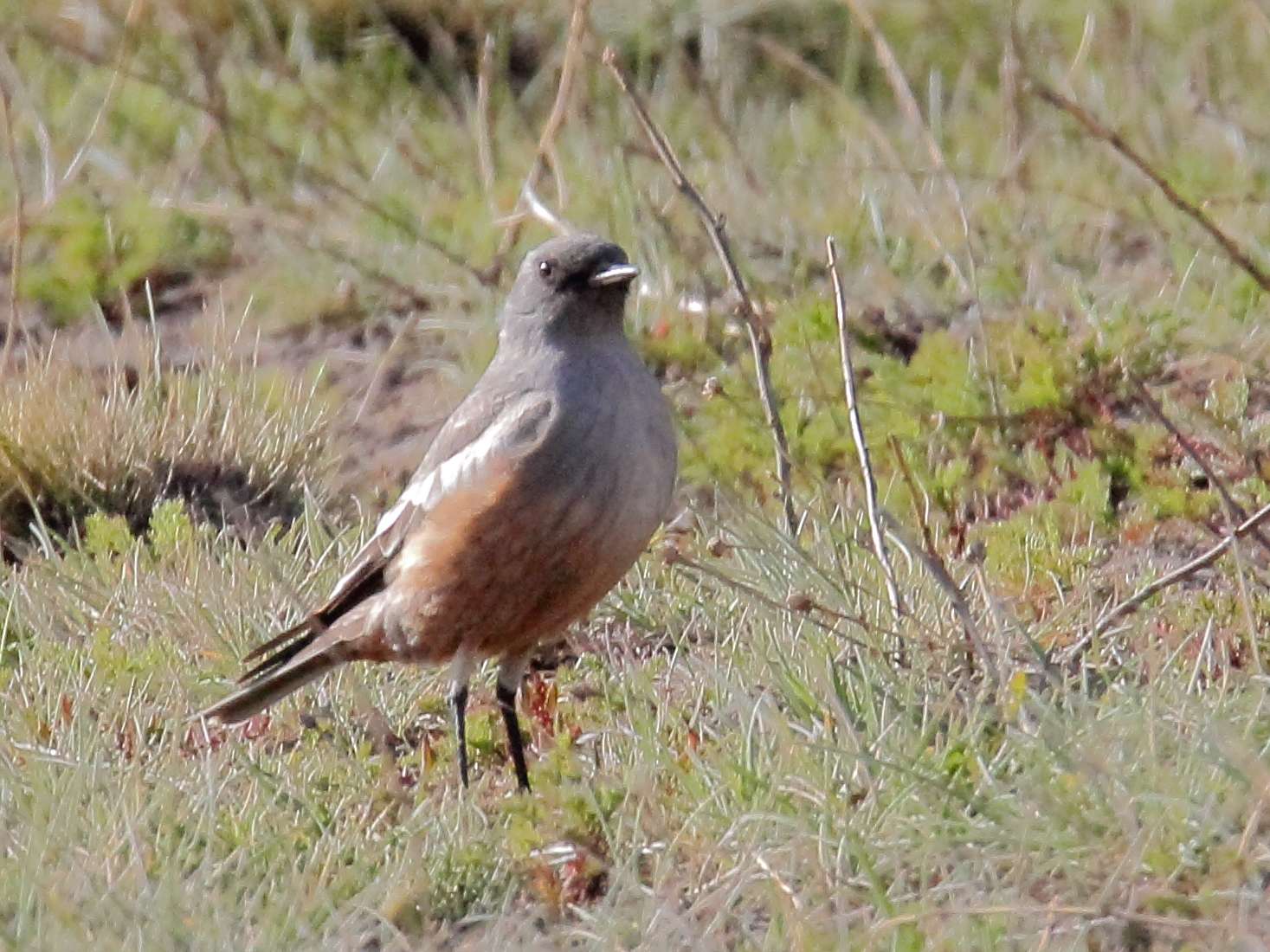

Conservation status
- Least Concern (IUCN 3.1)

Scientific classification
- Kingdom: Animalia
- Phylum: Chordata
- Class: Aves
- Order: Passeriformes
- Family: Tyrannidae
- Genus: Neoxolmis
- Species: N. rufiventris

Binomial name
- Neoxolmis rufiventris (Vieillot, 1823)
- Breeding Non-Breeding

Synonyms
- See text

= Chocolate-vented tyrant =

Species of bird

The chocolate-vented tyrant (Neoxolmis rufiventris) is a species of bird in the family Tyrannidae, the tyrant flycatchers. It is found in Argentina, Chile, and Uruguay, possibly in Paraguay, and as a vagrant to Brazil.

== Taxonomy and systematics ==
The chocolate-vented tyrant has a complicated taxonomic history. It was formally described in 1823 as "Tyrannus Rufiventris". Later in the nineteenth century and into the twentieth other authors placed it variously in genera Myiotheretes, Taenioptera, and Xolmis. In 1927 it was moved to newly erected genus Neoxolmis. Studies published in 2020 placed it in genus Nengetus. The South American Classification Committee of the American Ornithological Society (SACC) retained it Neoxolmis. The IOC and the Clements taxonomy soon agreed with that assignment. However, as of December 2024 BirdLife International's Handbook of the Birds of the World retained the species in Xolmis.

The chocolate-vented tyrant is monotypic.

== Description ==
The chocolate-vented tyrant is 20 to 23 cm (7.9 to 9.1 in) long and weighs about 77 g (2.7 oz). The sexes have the same plumage. Adults have a mostly ashy gray face with blackish in front of the eye and on the ear coverts. Their upperparts are brownish gray. Their wing coverts are mostly white with pale sandy brown edges on the greater coverts. Their primaries are black. Their secondaries have rufous bases and wide white tips and their tertials are white with pale sandy brown edges. The white and rufous of the wings shows dramatically in flight. Their notched tail is mostly black with white outer webs on the outermost feathers. Their throat and upper breast are gray and the rest of their underparts are cinnamon. They have a dark iris, a black bill, and black legs and feet. Juveniles have a rufous tinge on the ear coverts and their gray underparts have wide darker gray streaks.

== Distribution and habitat ==
The chocolate-vented tyrant is found from Córdoba Province in north central Argentina east across southern Uruguay and south through Argentina into both Argentinian and Chilean Patagonia and Tierra del Fuego. In addition, the SACC has records of it as a vagrant in far southern Brazil. The SACC also has unconfirmed records from Paraguay so it calls the species hypothetical in that country. The species inhabits open and semi-open grasslands, brushy steppe, and agricultural fields and pastures. In elevation it mostly ranges up to about 500 m (1,600 ft) but locally reaches 1,500 m (4,900 ft).

== Behavior ==
=== Movement ===
The chocolate-vented tyrant is a complete migrant. It breeds in far southern Chile and in Argentina south from Río Negro Province. It entirely vacates its breeding range for the austral winter, moving further north in Argentina from Río Negro as far as Córdoba Province and across southern Uruguay. It has appeared in extreme southern Brazil and possibly in Paraguay.

=== Feeding ===
The chocolate-vented tyrant feeds mostly on insects and also includes small lizards in its diet. In the breeding season it forages mostly in pairs but in winter is usually in small flocks. It is mostly terrestrial, walking or running with pauses to scan or capture prey, but it will perch on low bushes or fence posts. When it does fly, its flight is fast and direct.

=== Breeding ===
The chocolate-vented tyrant breeds in November and December in Argentina. Its nest is a cup made of twigs lined with grass and feathers, and placed in the ground under a shrub or tussock. The clutch is two to three eggs. The incubation period, time to fledging, and details of parental care are not known.

=== Vocalization ===
The chocolate-vented tyrant is mostly quiet. Its principal vocalization is a "weak bur-bit" given at dawn and dusk from the ground or atop a rock.

== Status ==
The IUCN has assessed the chocolate-vented tyrant as being of Least Concern. It has a very large range; its population size and trend are not known. No immediate threats have been identified. It is considered rare to uncommon overall but fairly common in some parts of Argentina. "Much grassland has already been destroyed by grazing sheep, and only few protected areas exist, e.g. Tierra del Fuego National Park, in Argentina, and Magallanes National Reserve, in Chile."
