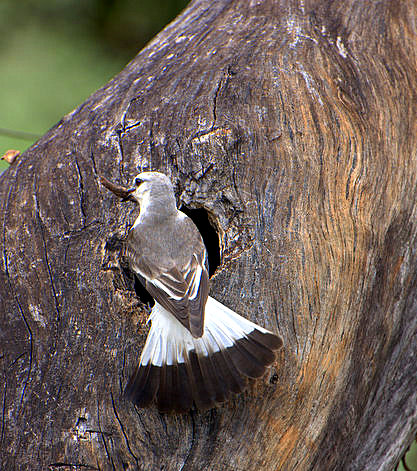
- White-rumped monjita (Xolmis velatus)

Scientific classification
- Kingdom: Animalia
- Phylum: Chordata
- Class: Aves
- Order: Passeriformes
- Family: Tyrannidae
- Genus: Xolmis; F. Boie, 1826

Type species
- Tyrannus irupero Vieillot, 1823

Species
- see text

= Xolmis =

Genus of birds

Xolmis is a genus of South American birds in the tyrant flycatcher family Tyrannidae.

These are relative large flycatchers that are found in fairly open habitats. Most have black, grey and white plumage.

== Species ==
The genus contains two species:

Image	Common name	Scientific name	Distribution
	White-rumped monjita	Xolmis velatus	Bolivia, Brazil, Argentina and Paraguay.
	White monjita	Xolmis irupero	Brazil, Paraguay, Argentina, Bolivia, and Uruguay.
