= List of herons =

The International Ornithological Committee (IOC) recognizes these 75 species of herons, egrets, and bitterns in the family Ardeidae. They are distributed among 18 genera, some of which have only one species. Six extinct species are included; they are marked (X).

== List ==
This list is presented according to the IOC taxonomic sequence and can also be sorted alphabetically by common name and binomial.

Common name	Binomial name + authority	IOC sequence
White-crested tiger heron	Tigriornis leucolopha (Jardine, 1846)	1
Rufescent tiger heron	Tigrisoma lineatum (Boddaert, 1783)	2
Bare-throated tiger heron	Tigrisoma mexicanum Swainson, 1834	3
Fasciated tiger heron	Tigrisoma fasciatum (Such, 1825)	4
Boat-billed heron	Cochlearius cochlearius (Linnaeus, 1766)	5
Agami heron	Agamia agami (Gmelin, JF, 1789)	6
Zigzag heron	Zebrilus undulatus (Gmelin, JF, 1789)	7
Eurasian bittern	Botaurus stellaris (Linnaeus, 1758)	8
Australasian bittern	Botaurus poiciloptilus (Wagler, 1827)	9
American bittern	Botaurus lentiginosus (Rackett, 1813)	10
Pinnated bittern	Botaurus pinnatus (Wagler, 1829)	11
Stripe-backed bittern	Botaurus involucris (Vieillot, 1823)	12
Least bittern	Botaurus exilis (Gmelin, JF, 1789)	13
Black bittern	Botaurus flavicollis (Latham, 1790)	14
Cinnamon bittern	Botaurus cinnamomeus (Gmelin, JF, 1789)	15
Von Schrenck's bittern	Botaurus eurhythmus (Swinhoe, 1873)	16
Dwarf bittern	Botaurus sturmii (Wagler, 1827)	17
Little bittern	Botaurus minutus (Linnaeus, 1766)	18
Yellow bittern	Botaurus sinensis (Gmelin, JF, 1789)	19
Black-backed bittern	Botaurus dubius Mathews, 1912	20
New Zealand bittern (X)	Botaurus novaezelandiae (Purdie, 1871)	21
Yellow-crowned night heron	Nyctanassa violacea (Linnaeus, 1758)	22
Bermuda night heron (X)	Nyctanassa carcinocatactes Olson & Wingate, 2006	23
Black-crowned night heron	Nycticorax nycticorax (Linnaeus, 1758)	24
Ascension night heron (X)	Nycticorax olsoni Bourne, Ashmole & Simmons, 2003	25
Reunion night heron (X)	Nycticorax duboisi (Rothschild, 1907)	26
Mauritius night heron (X)	Nycticorax mauritianus (Newton, E & Gadow, 1893)	27
Rodrigues night heron (X)	Nycticorax megacephalus (Milne-Edwards, 1873)	28
Nankeen night heron	Nycticorax caledonicus (Gmelin, JF, 1789)	29
Malayan night heron	Gorsachius melanolophus (Raffles, 1822)	30
Japanese night heron	Gorsachius goisagi (Temminck, 1836)	31
Capped heron	Pilherodius pileatus (Boddaert, 1783)	32
Whistling heron	Syrigma sibilatrix (Temminck, 1824)	33
Little blue heron	Egretta caerulea (Linnaeus, 1758)	34
Tricolored heron	Egretta tricolor (Müller, PLS, 1776)	35
Reddish egret	Egretta rufescens (Gmelin, JF, 1789)	36
Slaty egret	Egretta vinaceigula (Sharpe, 1895)	37
Black heron	Egretta ardesiaca (Wagler, 1827)	38
Pacific reef heron	Egretta sacra (Gmelin, JF, 1789)	39
Chinese egret	Egretta eulophotes (Swinhoe, 1860)	40
Snowy egret	Egretta thula (Molina, 1782)	41
Little egret	Egretta garzetta (Linnaeus, 1766)	42
Dimorphic egret	Egretta dimorpha Hartert, EJO, 1914	43
Western reef heron	Egretta gularis (Bosc, 1792)	44
Pied heron	Egretta picata (Gould, 1845)	45
White-faced heron	Egretta novaehollandiae (Latham, 1790)	46
White-backed night heron	Calherodius leuconotus (Wagler, 1827)	47
White-eared night heron	Oroanassa magnifica (Ogilvie-Grant, 1899)	48
Little heron	Butorides atricapilla (Afzelius, 1804)	49
Striated heron	Butorides striata (Linnaeus, 1758)	50
Lava heron	Butorides sundevalli (Reichenow, 1877)	51
Green heron	Butorides virescens (Linnaeus, 1758)	52
Forest bittern	Zonerodius heliosylus (Lesson, RP & Garnot, 1828)	53
Rufous-bellied heron	Ardeola rufiventris (Sundevall, 1850)	54
Squacco heron	Ardeola ralloides (Scopoli, 1769)	55
Malagasy pond heron	Ardeola idae (Hartlaub, 1860)	56
Indian pond heron	Ardeola grayii (Sykes, 1832)	57
Chinese pond heron	Ardeola bacchus (Bonaparte, 1855)	58
Javan pond heron	Ardeola speciosa (Horsfield, 1821)	59
White-necked heron	Ardea pacifica Latham, 1801	60
Great egret	Ardea alba Linnaeus, 1758	61
Yellow-billed egret	Ardea brachyrhyncha Brehm, AE, 1854	62
Medium egret	Ardea intermedia Wagler, 1829	63
Plumed egret	Ardea plumifera Gould, 1848	64
Western cattle egret	Ardea ibis (Linnaeus, 1758)	65
Eastern cattle egret	Ardea coromanda (Boddaert, 1783)	66
Grey heron	Ardea cinerea Linnaeus, 1758	67
Great blue heron	Ardea herodias Linnaeus, 1758	68
Cocoi heron	Ardea cocoi Linnaeus, 1766	69
Purple heron	Ardea purpurea Linnaeus, 1766	70
Humblot's heron	Ardea humbloti Milne-Edwards & Grandidier, A, 1885	71
White-bellied heron	Ardea insignis Hume, 1878	72
Great-billed heron	Ardea sumatrana Raffles, 1822	73
Black-headed heron	Ardea melanocephala Children & Vigors, 1826	74
Goliath heron	Ardea goliath Cretzschmar, 1829	75
