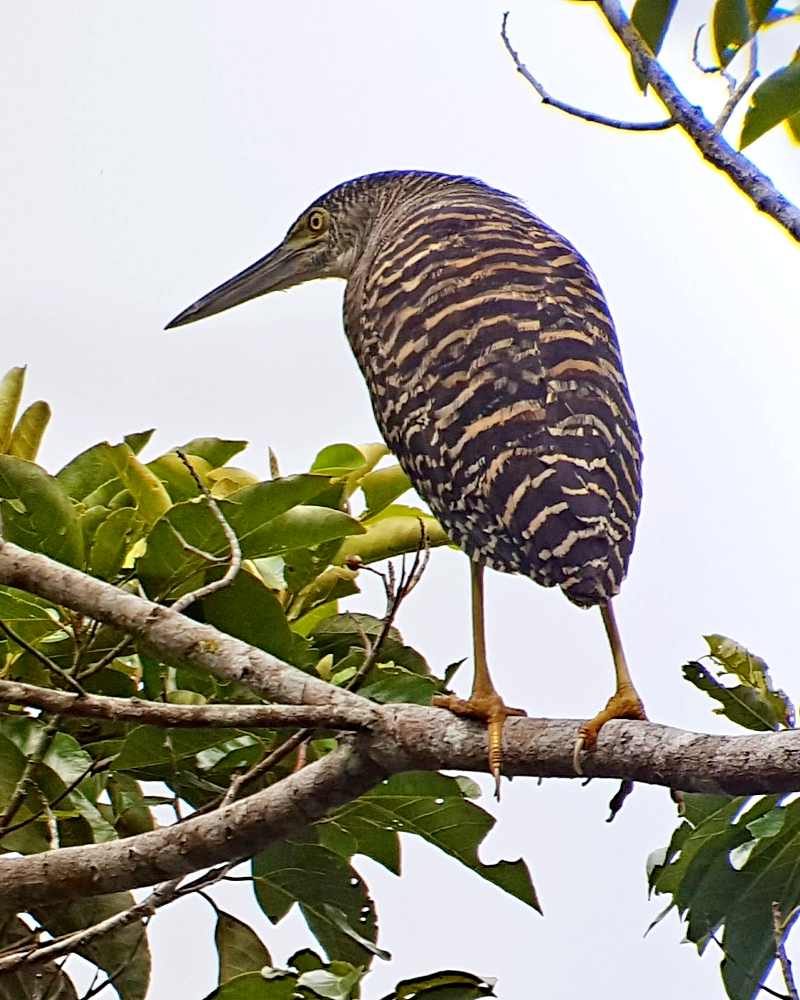

Conservation status
- Near Threatened (IUCN 3.1)

Scientific classification
- Kingdom: Animalia
- Phylum: Chordata
- Class: Aves
- Order: Pelecaniformes
- Family: Ardeidae
- Subfamily: Tigriornithinae
- Genus: Zonerodius; Salvadori, 1882
- Species: Z. heliosylus

Binomial name
- Zonerodius heliosylus (Lesson & Garnot, 1828)

= Forest bittern =

Species of bird

The forest bittern (Zonerodius heliosylus) is a bird indigenous to New Guinea. It is the only member of the genus Zonerodius and is also known as the New Guinea tiger heron.
