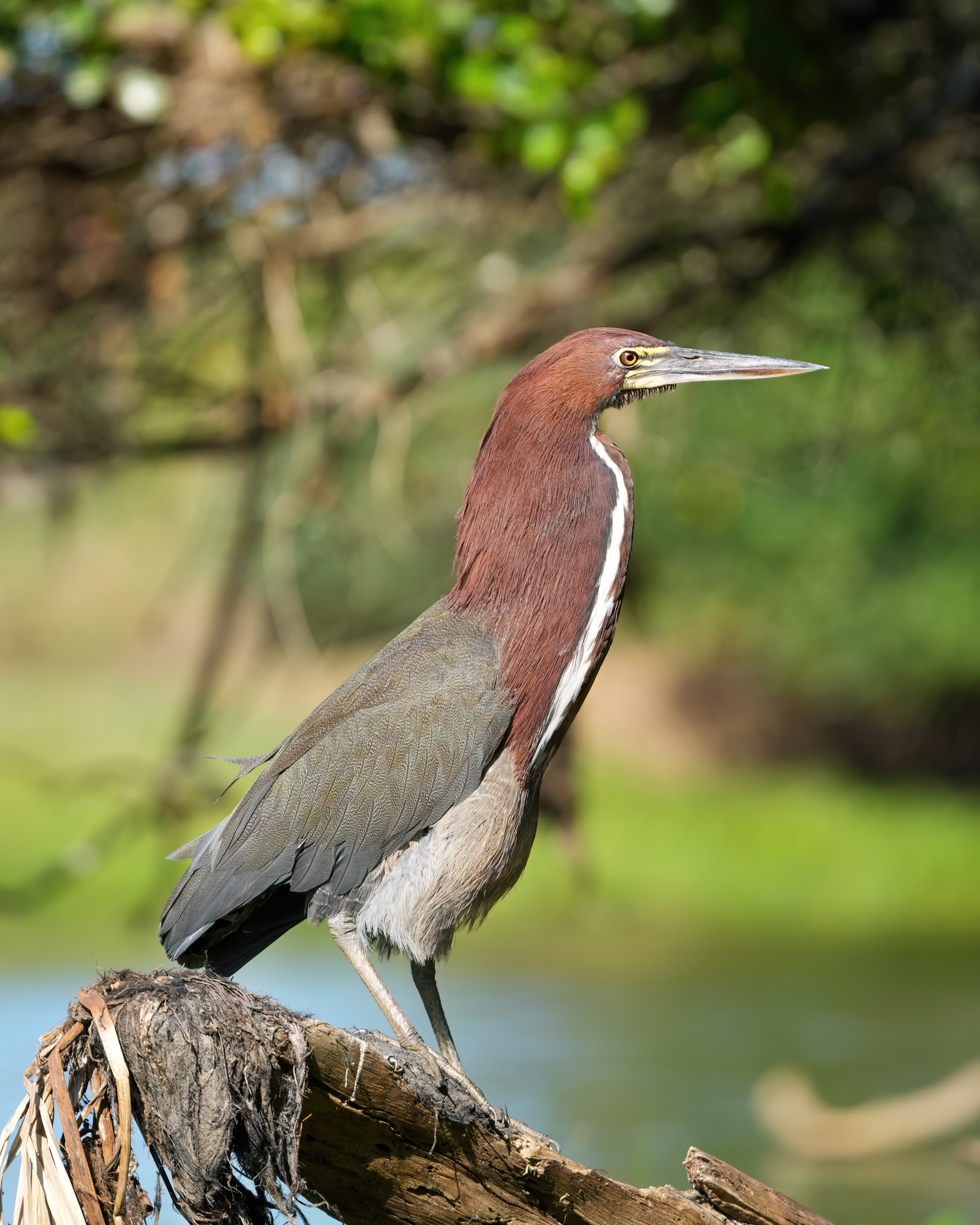
- in the Pantanal, Brazil

Conservation status
- Least Concern (IUCN 3.1)

Scientific classification
- Kingdom: Animalia
- Phylum: Chordata
- Class: Aves
- Order: Pelecaniformes
- Family: Ardeidae
- Genus: Tigrisoma
- Species: T. lineatum

Binomial name
- Tigrisoma lineatum (Boddaert, 1783)

= Rufescent tiger heron =

Species of bird

The rufescent tiger heron (Tigrisoma lineatum) is a species of heron, birds in the family Ardeidae. It is found in wetlands from Central America through much of South America.

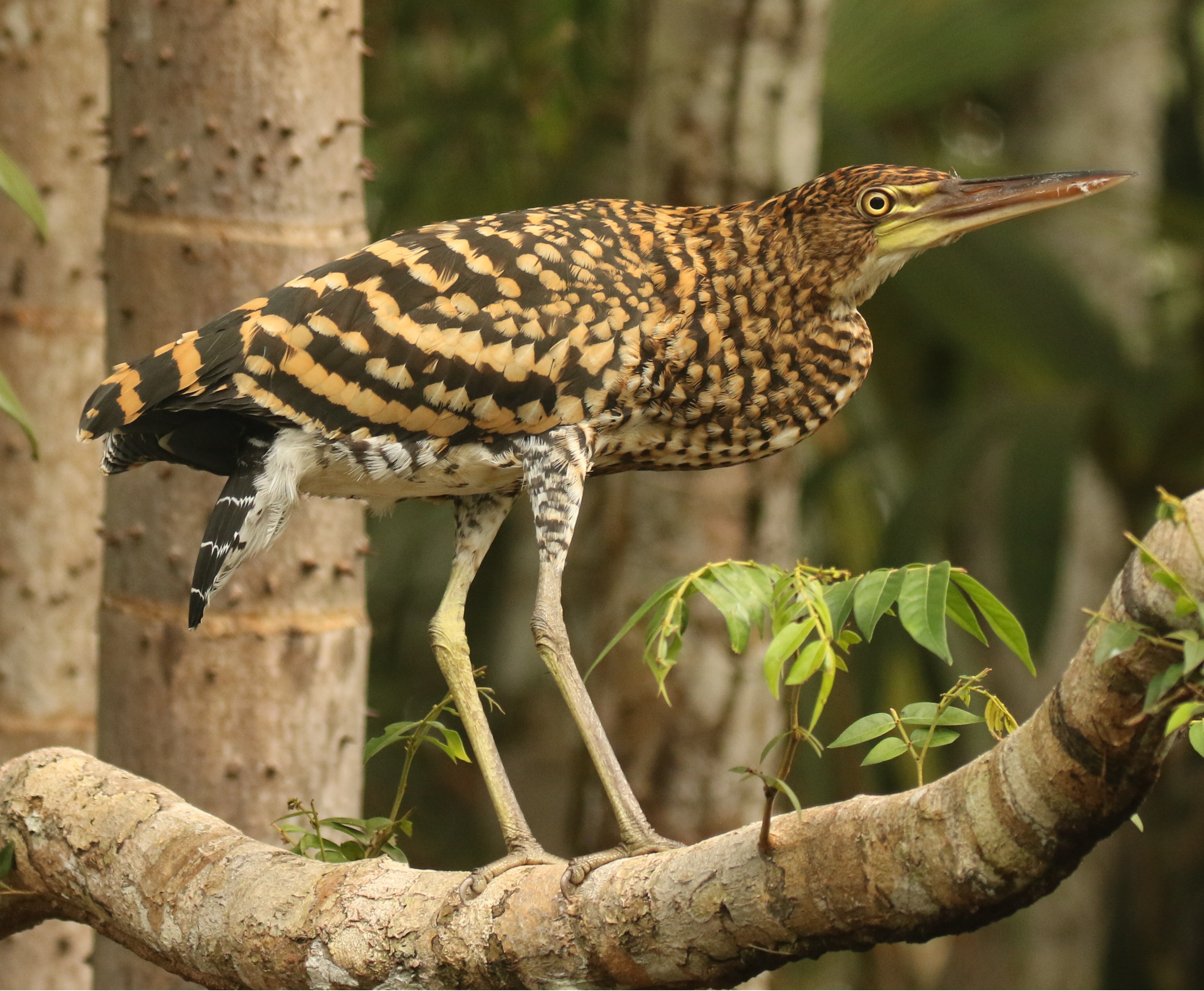
Juvenile - Sacha Lodge - Ecuador

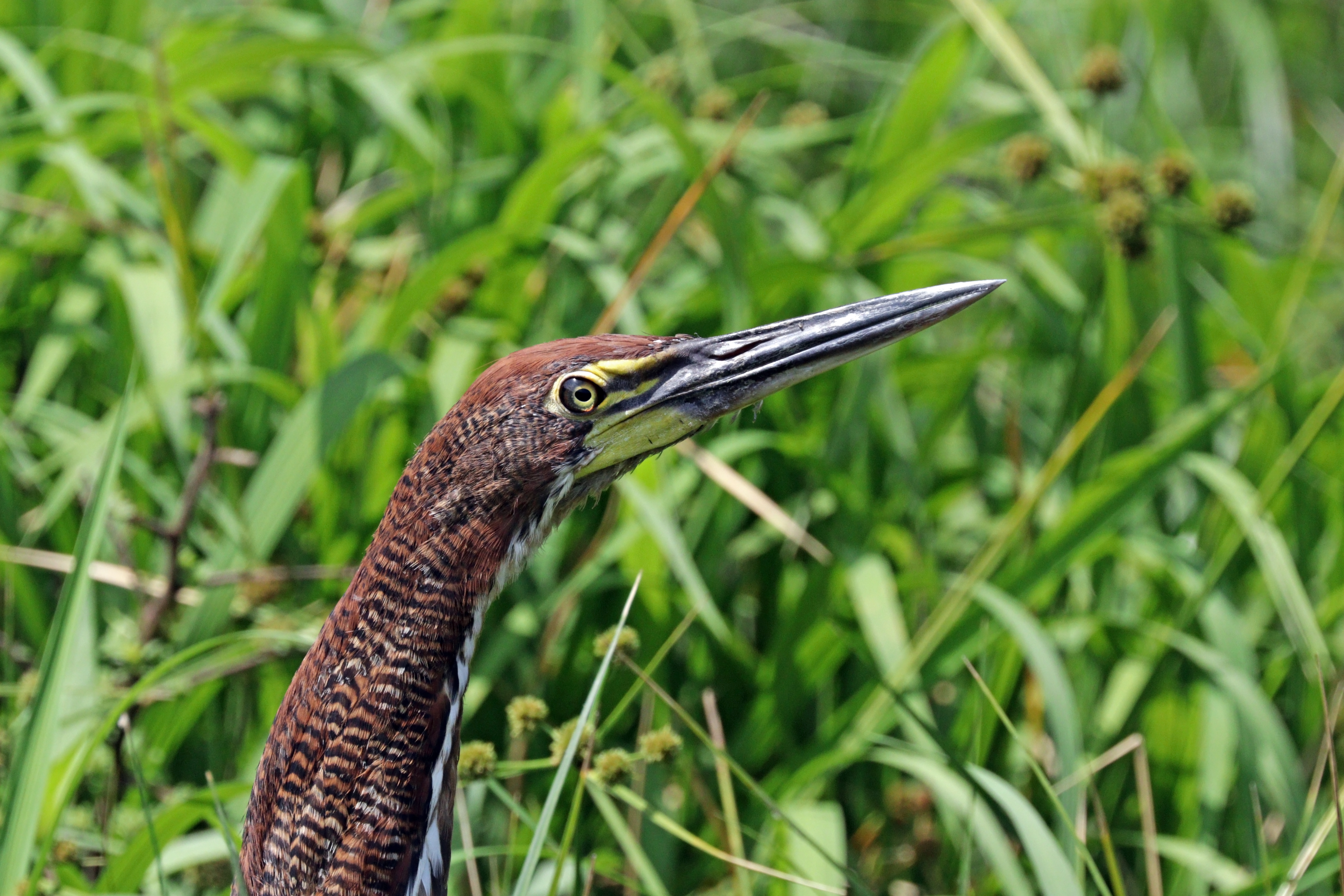
T. l. lineatum, young adult, Panama

== Taxonomy ==
The rufescent tiger heron was described by the French polymath Georges-Louis Leclerc, Comte de Buffon in 1780 in his Histoire Naturelle des Oiseaux from a specimen collected in Cayenne, French Guiana. The bird was also illustrated in a hand-coloured plate engraved by François-Nicolas Martinet in the Planches Enluminées D'Histoire Naturelle which was produced under the supervision of Edme-Louis Daubenton to accompany Buffon's text. Neither the plate caption nor Buffon's description included a scientific name but in 1783 the Dutch naturalist Pieter Boddaert coined the binomial name Ardea lineata in his catalogue of the Planches Enluminées. The rufescent tiger heron is now placed in the genus Tigrisoma that was erected by the English naturalist William Swainson in 1827. The genus name Tigrisoma combines the Ancient Greek tigris, meaning "tiger" and somā, meaning "body"; the specific epithet lineatum is from the Latin lineatus meaning "marked with lines".

Two subspecies are recognised:

- T. l. lineatum (Boddaert, 1783) – Honduras south to northeast Bolivia and Amazonian Brazil
- T. l. marmoratum (Vieillot, 1817) – southeast Bolivia to south Brazil and north Argentina

== Description ==
The rufescent tiger heron is a medium-sized heron, measuring 26–30 in (66–76 cm) in length, (Note: By convention, length is measured from the tip of the bill to the tip of the tail on a dead bird (or skin) laid on its back.) with a mass between 630 and 980 g (22 and 35 oz). The sexes are similarly plumaged. The adult's head, neck and chest are dark rufous, with a white stripe down the center of the foreneck. The remainder of its upperparts are brownish with fine black vermiculations, its belly and vent are buffy-brown, and its flanks are barred black and white. Its tail is black, narrowly barred with white. Its stout bill is yellowish to dusky, and its legs are dull green. Its irides, loral skin, and orbital ring are bright yellow. Unlike other tiger herons, it has no powder down feathers on its back.

The juvenile bird is rusty-buff overall, coarsely barred with black; the buff and black banding on its wings is especially pronounced. Its throat, central chest, and belly are white. It takes some five years to acquire adult plumage.

=== Similar species ===
The adult rufescent tiger heron is relatively easy to distinguish from fasciated and bare-throated tiger herons, as it is rufous (rather than primarily gray) on the head and neck. Young birds, however, are much more difficult to identify.

== Distribution and habitat ==
The rufescent tiger heron is found in wetlands from Central America through much of South America. It generally occurs below 500 m (1,600 ft), though it has been recorded as high as 1,600 m (5,200 ft) in Colombia.

== Behavior ==
It is largely crepuscular and generally solitary.

=== Food and feeding ===
As might be expected of a species that spends most of its time by the water, much of the rufescent tiger heron's diet is aquatic-based, including fish, crustaceans, water beetles, and dragonfly larvae. It also takes adult dragonflies and grasshoppers. It typically hunts alone, standing hunched in shallow pools or wet areas of a forest while it waits for prey.

=== Voice ===
The rufescent tiger heron's main call is a low-pitched paired hoot, often given at night. It also gives a fast series of sharp wok notes, which decrease in volume and speed, and a prolonged hoot, transcribed as ooooooo-ooh which rises markedly at the end.

juvenile, the Pantanal, Brazil

== Conservation ==
Although the rufescent tiger heron's population size and trend has not been quantified, its range is huge, so the International Union for Conservation of Nature lists it as a species of least concern.
