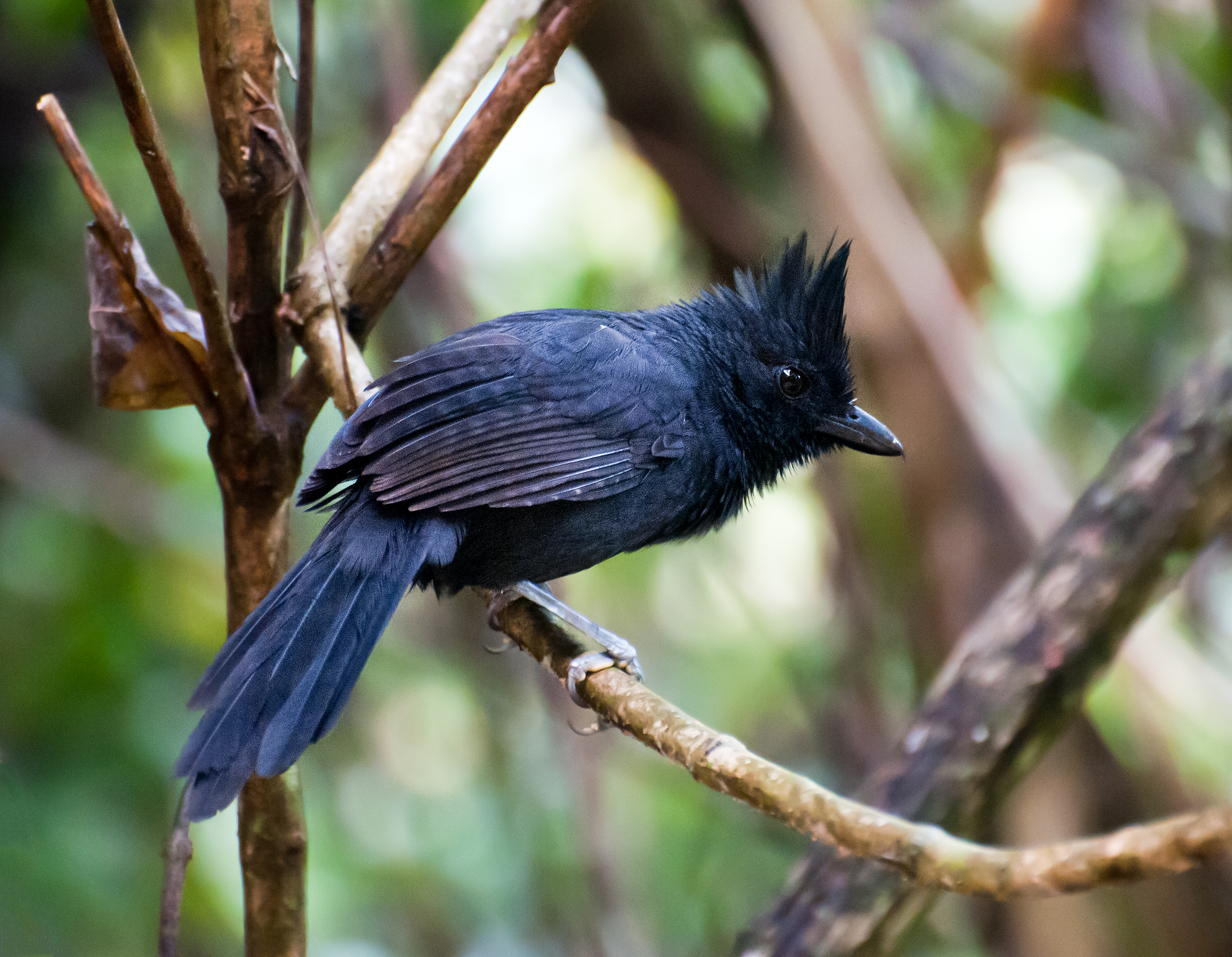
- Tufted antshrike (Mackenziaena severa)

Scientific classification
- Domain: Eukaryota
- Kingdom: Animalia
- Phylum: Chordata
- Class: Aves
- Order: Passeriformes
- Family: Thamnophilidae
- Genus: Mackenziaena; Chubb, 1918

Type species
- Thamnophilus leachii Such, 1825

= Mackenziaena =

Genus of birds

Mackenziaena is a genus of bird in the family Thamnophilidae. First circumscribed by Charles Chubb in 1918, it contains the following species as of 2017:

- Large-tailed antshrike (Mackenziaena leachii)
- Tufted antshrike (Mackenziaena severa)

The genus commemorates Helen Mackenzie McConnell, who was the wife of English collector Frederick McConnell.

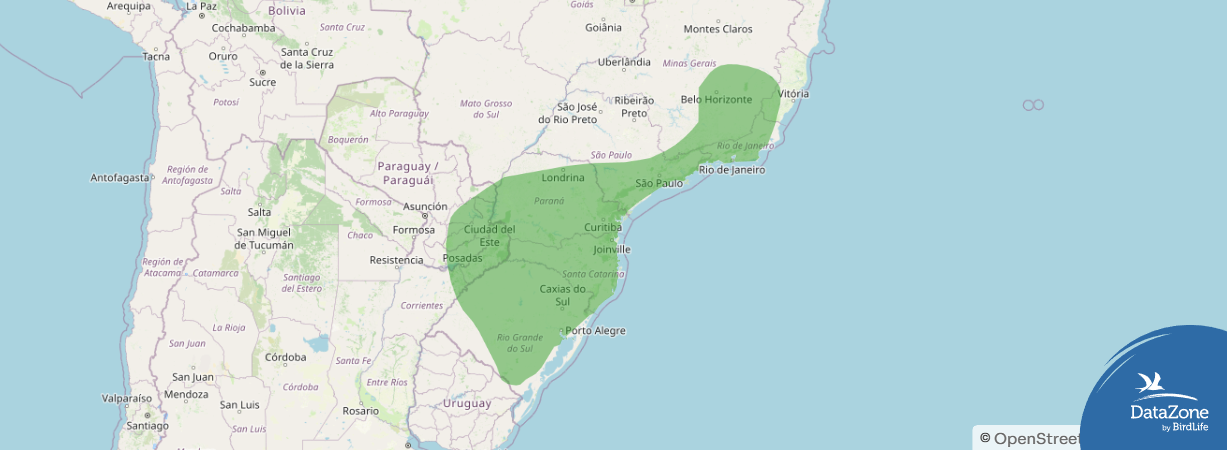
Distribution of Mackenziaena leachii
