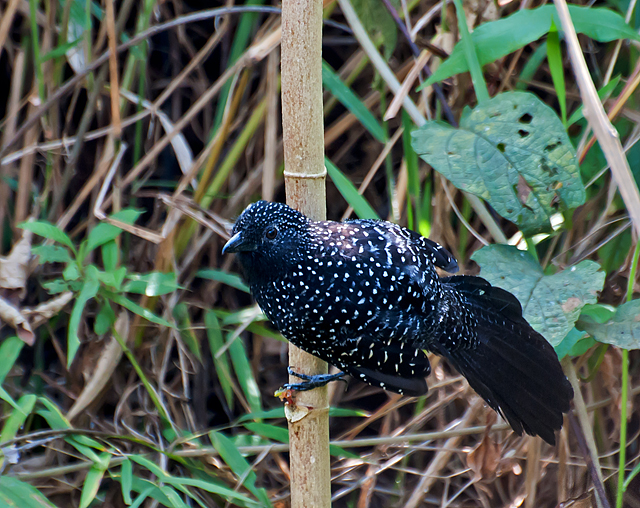
- In Piraju, São Paulo, Brazil

Conservation status
- Least Concern (IUCN 3.1)

Scientific classification
- Kingdom: Animalia
- Phylum: Chordata
- Class: Aves
- Order: Passeriformes
- Family: Thamnophilidae
- Genus: Mackenziaena
- Species: M. leachii

Binomial name
- Mackenziaena leachii (Such, 1825)

= Large-tailed antshrike =

Species of bird

The large-tailed antshrike (Mackenziaena leachii) is a species of bird in subfamily Thamnophilinae of family Thamnophilidae, the "typical antbirds". It is found in Argentina, Brazil, Paraguay, and Uruguay.

== Taxonomy and systematics ==
The large-tailed antshrike shares genus Mackenziaena with the tufted antshrike (M. severa) though there is some doubt about how closely they are related. Both species are monotypic.

== Description ==
The large-tailed antshrike is a large dark antbird with a long full tail. It is 25 to 26 cm (9.8 to 10 in) long and weighs 58 to 62 g (2.0 to 2.2 oz). The species exhibits significant sexual dimorphism, though both sexes have a moderately long black bill with a hook at the end like true shrikes. Adult males are mostly black with small white spots on their crown, nape, upperparts, and sides. Adult females are mostly brownish black. Their forehead is rufous, their crown is rufous with black edges on its feathers, their upperparts have pale buff spots, and their wings have pale buff bars. Their underparts are thickly spotted with buffy white and their crissum is barred with buffy white. Subadults resemble adult females but their spots are larger and their belly and tail have faint pale bars.

== Distribution and habitat ==
The large-tailed antshrike's range was long thought to be from eastern Minas Gerais and southern Espírito Santo in Brazil south through eastern Paraguay into northeast Argentina's Misiones Province. However, a 2012 publication documented a record in northeastern Uruguay, and the South American Classification Committee of the American Ornithological Society accepted the record. The large-tailed antshrike is a bird of the Atlantic Forest. It inhabits the dense understorey of several forest types. In the more northerly part of its range it occurs in humid foothill and montane forest, especially in areas with large stands of bamboo. To the south it prefers somewhat degraded forest including scrub with much bamboo, dry forest, humid and stunted foothill woodlands, and thickets at the edge of taller forest. In elevation it ranges from sea level to about 2,200 m (7,200 ft) and it tends to be at higher elevations in the northern part of its range.

== Behavior ==
=== Movement ===
The large-tailed antshrike is presumed to be a year-round resident throughout its range.

=== Feeding ===
The large-tailed antshrike feeds on a variety of large insects and other arthropods; its diet also includes molluscs and small vertebrates including frogs, lizards, snakes, bird eggs and nestlings. It forages singly or in pairs, almost always within about 5 m (15 ft) of the ground in dense bamboo and shrubs. It hops from branch to branch and along the ground, reaching from a perch to glean prey from leaves, stems, and branches. It often drops to the ground to seize prey.

=== Breeding ===
Nothing is known about the large-tailed antshrike's breeding biology.

=== Vocalization ===
The large-tailed antshrike's song is a "hurried, slightly slowing down, at first rising then descending series of about 15 very high, strident 'sweep' notes". Its call is a "downslurred, sharp 'sreee'. Because the species favors dense understorey, it is more often heard than seen.

== Status ==
The IUCN has assessed the long-tailed antshrike as being of Least Concern. Its population size is not known and is believed to be decreasing. No immediate threats have been identified. It occurs in several protected areas. The "[r]elatively small range of this species and the fragmented nature of remaining Atlantic Forest are, however, causes for concern, as it appears that this antshrike does not survive in small residual forest patches in this region".
