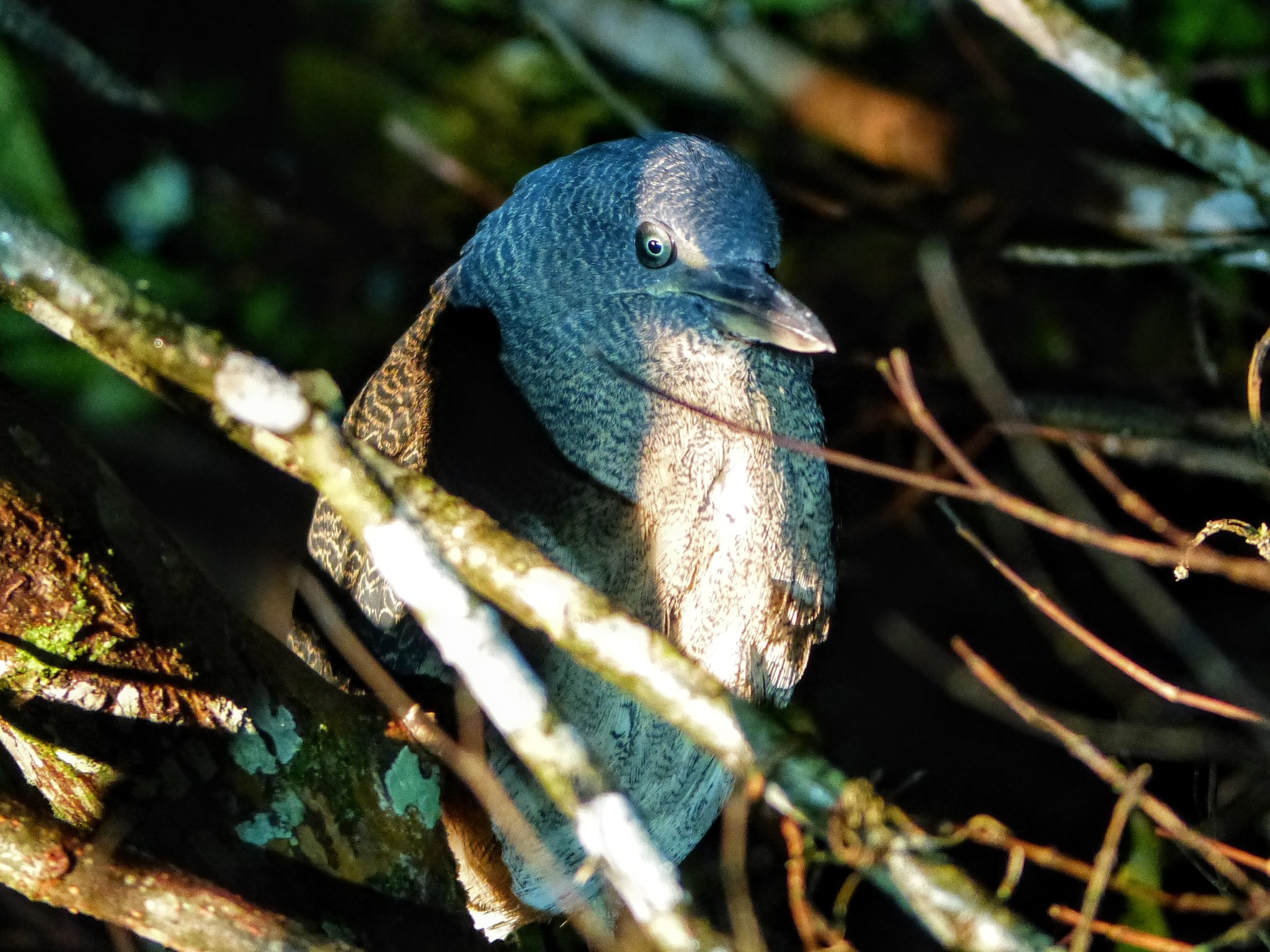

Conservation status
- Least Concern (IUCN 3.1)

Scientific classification
- Kingdom: Animalia
- Phylum: Chordata
- Class: Aves
- Order: Pelecaniformes
- Family: Ardeidae
- Subfamily: Botaurinae
- Genus: Zebrilus; Bonaparte, 1855
- Species: Z. undulatus

Binomial name
- Zebrilus undulatus (Gmelin, 1789)

= Zigzag heron =

Species of bird

The zigzag heron (Zebrilus undulatus) is a species of heron in the family Ardeidae, also including egrets and bitterns. It is in the monotypic genus Zebrilus. It is found in Bolivia, Brazil, Colombia, Ecuador, French Guiana, Guyana, Peru, Suriname, and Venezuela. Its natural habitat is subtropical or tropical swamps.

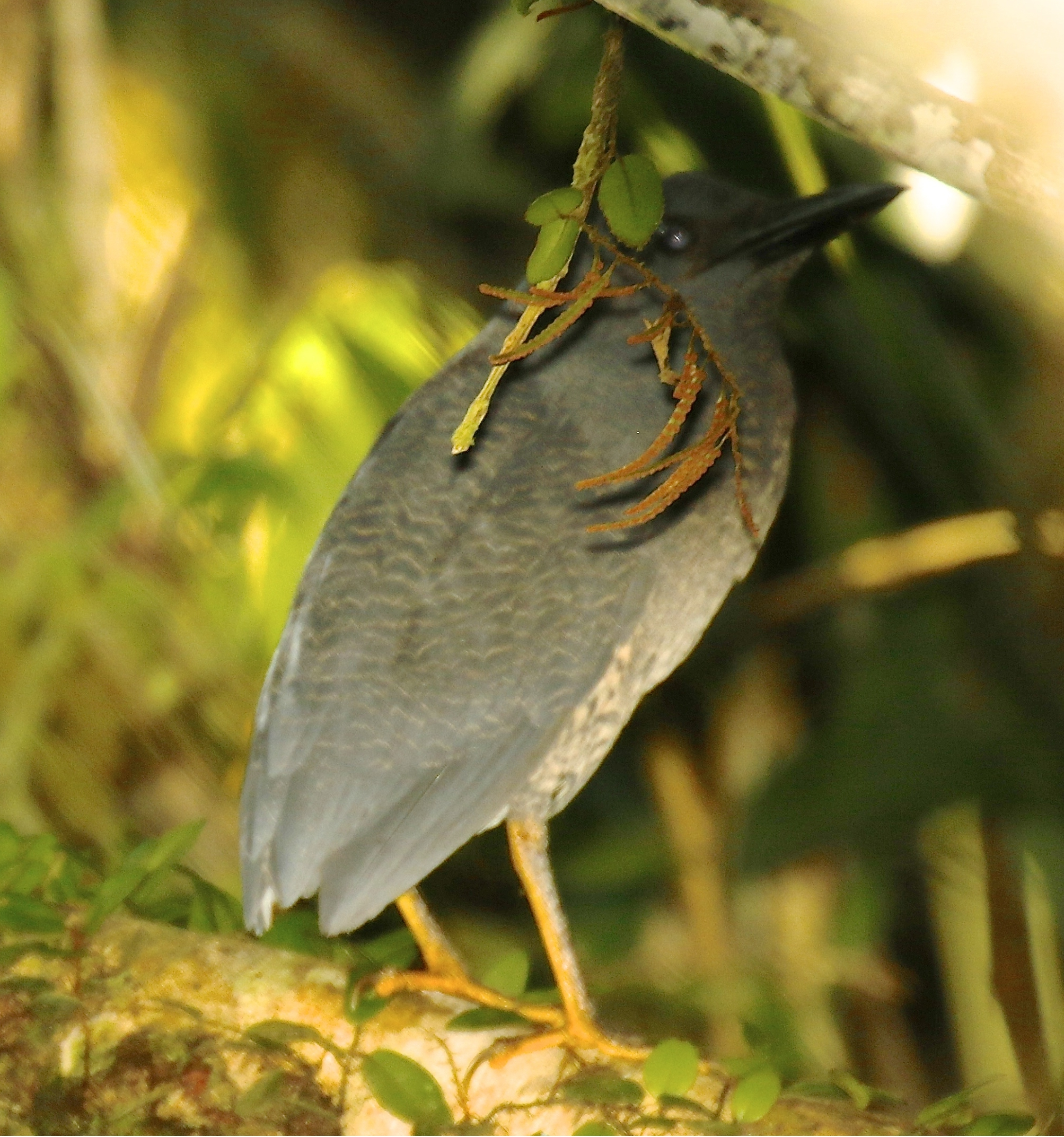
Sani Lodge - Ecuador

== Taxonomy ==
The zigzag heron was formally described in 1789 by the German naturalist Johann Friedrich Gmelin in his revised and expanded edition of Carl Linnaeus's Systema Naturae. He placed it with the herons, cranes, storks and bitterns in the genus Ardea and coined the binomial name Ardea undulata. Gmelin based his description on the zigzig bittern from Cayenne that had been described by the English ornithologist John Latham in his multi-volume work A General Synopsis of Birds. Latham had in turn based his account on "Le petit butor de Cayenne" that had been described and illustrated in Comte de Buffon's Histoire Naturelle des Oiseaux. The zigzag heron is the only species placed in the genus Zebrilus that was introduced in 1855 by the French naturalist Charles Lucien Bonaparte. The genus name Zebrilus is a diminutive of the French zèbre, "zebra". The specific epithet undulatus is Latin meaning "furnished with wave-like markings". The species is monotypic, with no subspecies being recognised.

== Description ==
The adult plumage is grey with fine zigzag barring, with a pale underside, standing about 32 centimetres (12 1/2 inches) in height. Juveniles have a dark back with a brown head and underside. Due to its appearance it was often assigned to the tiger herons (Tigrisoma and allies). It is however a true bittern, like these having only ten rectrices (other Ardeidae have twelve rectrices) and being unequivocally placed in the bittern lineage by DNA sequence data too. Short legs and necks and cryptic plumage may thus be plesiomorphic among Ardeidae in general.

== Distribution and habitat ==
The zigzag heron is a species of the entire Amazon Basin, east of the Andes cordillera, and the five bordering countries on the basin's western periphery, Colombia, Venezuela, Ecuador, Peru, and Bolivia. The range does not extend beyond the Orinoco River basin of Venezuela in the northwest, and in the east-northeast encompasses the Guianas; in the southeast Amazon Basin the range does not extend east of the Tapajós River drainage.

== Behaviour ==
They are reclusive birds, staying hidden in thick cover even while foraging.
