= Taphophoyx =

Scientific classification
- Kingdom: Animalia
- Phylum: Chordata
- Class: Aves
- Order: Pelecaniformes
- Family: Ardeidae
- Genus: †Taphophoyx; Steadman & Takano, 2019
- Species: †T. hodgei

Binomial name
- †Taphophoyx hodgei Steadman & Takano, 2019

Extinct genus of bird

Taphophoyx is an extinct genus of herons in the family Ardeidae. There is only one known species, Taphophoyx hodgei.

== Habitat ==
Taphophoyx hodgei is believed to have lived in wetlands, like the great blue heron does today.

== Discovery ==
T. hodgei was discovered in November 2017 in Montbrook Fossil Site, Florida by volunteers Toni-Ann Benjamin and Sharon Shears. On November 9th, 2017, a complete left coracoid was excavated, and a week later, a complete left scapula, two bones that have significant roles in flight. Taphophoyx is said to have been the first new taxon to have been discovered at Montbrook Site.

== Etymology ==
The name Taphophoyx means "Buried heron" in Greek and Latin, and hodgei is in honor of the landowner of Montbrook, Eddie Hodge, of whom also gives the common name for this species, "Hodge's tiger heron".

== Phylogenetics ==
The phylogenetic affinities of T. hodgei are not well resolved, but there is proof that the tiger herons and the boat-billed heron are the closest relatives of Taphophoyx, mainly evident on the faces articularis.
