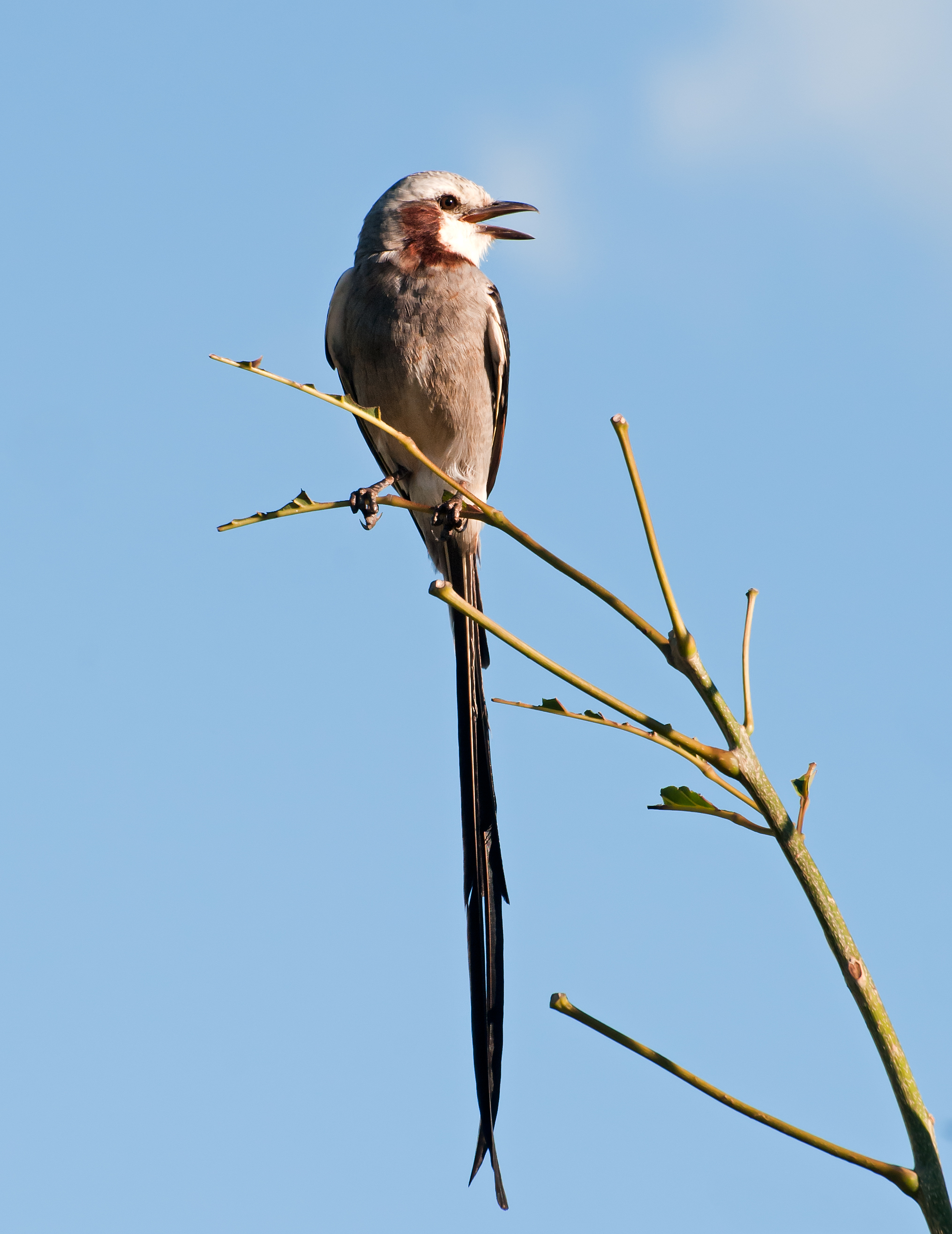
- In Piraju, São Paulo, Brazil

Conservation status
- Least Concern (IUCN 3.1)

Scientific classification
- Kingdom: Animalia
- Phylum: Chordata
- Class: Aves
- Order: Passeriformes
- Family: Tyrannidae
- Genus: Gubernetes; Such, 1825
- Species: G. yetapa

Binomial name
- Gubernetes yetapa (Vieillot, 1818)

= Streamer-tailed tyrant =

Species of bird

The streamer-tailed tyrant (Gubernetes yetapa) is a species of bird in the family Tyrannidae, the tyrant flycatchers. It is found in Argentina, Bolivia, Brazil, and Paraguay, and as a vagrant to Uruguay.

== Taxonomy and systematics ==
The streamer-tailed tyrant was formally described in 1818 as Muscicapa yetapa, erroneously placing it in the Old World flycatcher family. It was later transferred to its present genus Gubernetes that was erected in 1825 by George Such, albeit within family "Laniadae" (later Laniidae, the shrikes). (Note: Such described Gubernetes cunninghami as a new species, though the description and illustrations are those of the earlier Muscicapa yetapa. By the principle of priority, the specific epithet yetapa was retained when the species was moved to Gubernetes.)

The streamer-tailed tyrant is the only member of genus Gubernetes and has no subspecies.

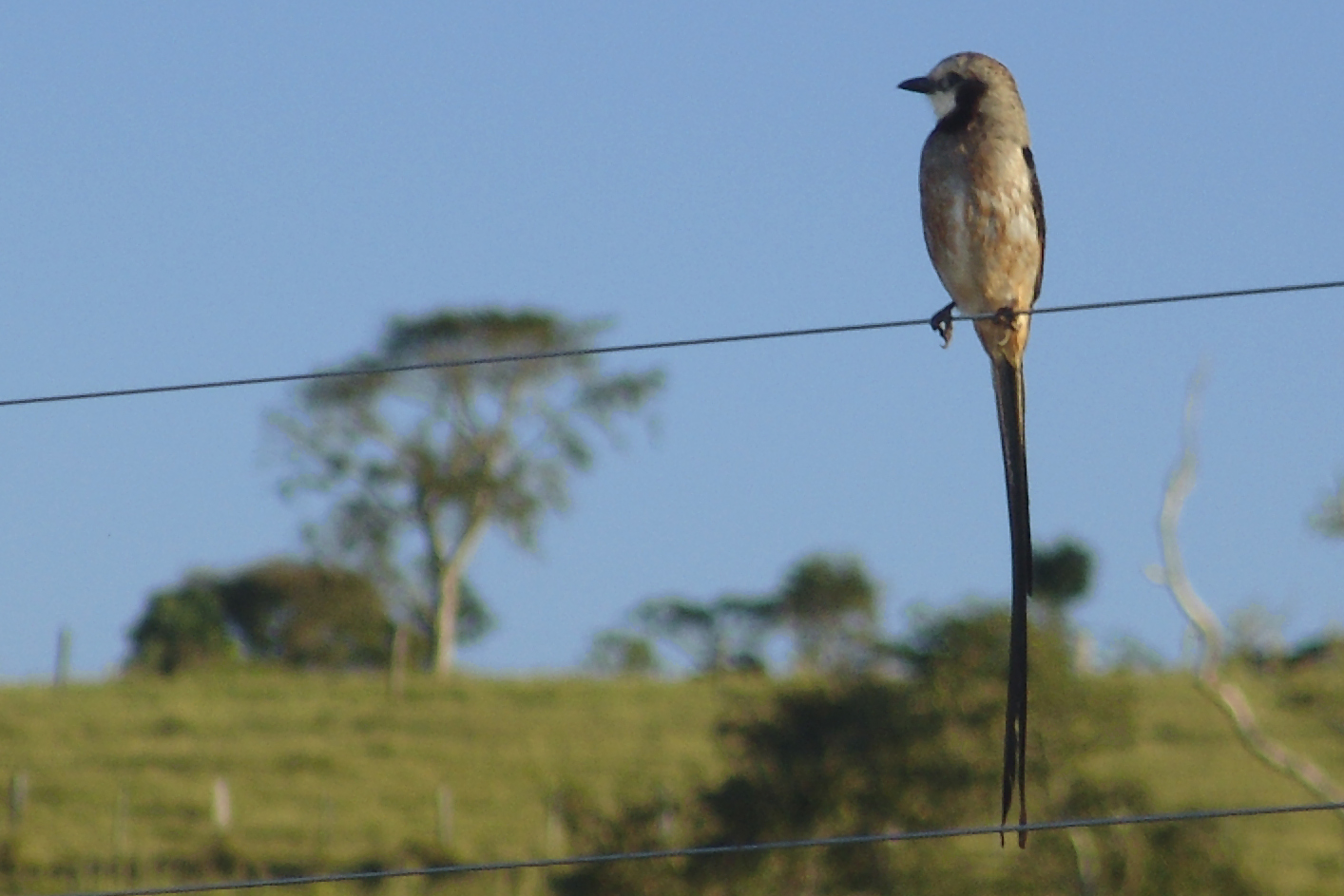

== Description ==
The streamer-tailed tyrant's body is about 35 cm (14 in) long; including the tail the species is 42 cm (17 in) long. The sexes have the almost the same plumage; females are smaller and slightly duller than males and have shorter tails. Adults have a pale gray forecrown and supercilium, a darker gray crown, and a black line through the eye. Their upperparts are gray with dark brown shafts on the feathers. Their wings are mostly blackish with a large cinnamon patch at the base of the primaries that shows conspicuously in flight. The wing's tertials have light brown to sandy brown edges. Their blackish tail is long, graduated, and deeply forked. Their throat is white with a dark chestnut collar below it that curves up to behind the eye. Their breast and sides are pale gray with faint dark shafts on the feathers and their belly is white. Juveniles are much duller than adults, with a much shorter tail and brown blotches on the upperparts. Adults have a dark iris, a stout black bill, and black legs and feet.

== Distribution and habitat ==
The streamer-tailed tyrant has a disjunct distribution. One population is found along the upper Beni River in northwestern Bolivia. The other range is much larger. It extends from eastern Bolivia east through southern Mato Grosso, northern Mato Grosso do Sul, Goiás, and Minas Gerais to far southern Bahia in Brazil and south through eastern Paraguay, Brazil's western Rio Grande do Sul, and northeastern Argentina's Chaco, Corrientes, and Misiones provinces. It has also been documented as a vagrant in Uruguay.

The streamer-tailed tyrant inhabits wet grasslands and marshy areas with nearby streams and shrubby areas, and also groves of moriche palm. Overall it ranges from sea level to 1,000 m (3,300 ft) in Brazil and up to 1,100 m (3,600 ft) elsewhere.

== Behavior ==
=== Movement ===
The streamer-tailed tyrant is a year-round resident.

=== Feeding ===
The streamer-tailed tyrant feeds on insects. It primarily forages in pairs though sometimes in family groups, perching on top of bushes and low trees, and often on the edge of gallery forest. It takes most prey in mid-air with long sallies from the perch ("hawking"), often low over marshes. It also sometimes pounces on prey on the ground or takes it from vegetation.

=== Breeding ===
The streamer-tailed tyrant apparently breeds between October and January in Brazil; its season elsewhere is not known. Pairs display; facing each other on a perch they teeter, raise and fan their tails, raise both wings high overhead, and call and pop their bills in a syncopated rhythm. One nest was an open cup made from thick grass stems lined with finer stems, rootlets, and shed snake skin. It was placed in a clump of marsh grass about 80 cm (30 in) above the ground and contained three white eggs. The incubation period, time to fledging, and details of parental care are not known.

=== Vocalization ===
The streamer-tailed tyrant's calls include "a harsh wurreep, repeated multiple times when hovering over foraging area [and a] fuller descending phrase of 2 or 3 notes, jew-jew-jew". During the courtship display one bird makes a "clearly whistled tewear-TEE-tear 2–4 times" and the other "a warbled tea-whittle, tea-whittle...".

== Status ==
The IUCN has assessed the streamer-tailed tyrant as being of Least Concern. It has a large range; its population size is not known and is believed to be stable. No immediate threats have been identified. It is overall considered uncommon to locally fairly common. It is "relatively common" in Beni Biosphere Reserve in northwestern Bolivia and occurs in several national parks and other protected areas in Paraguay and Brazil.
