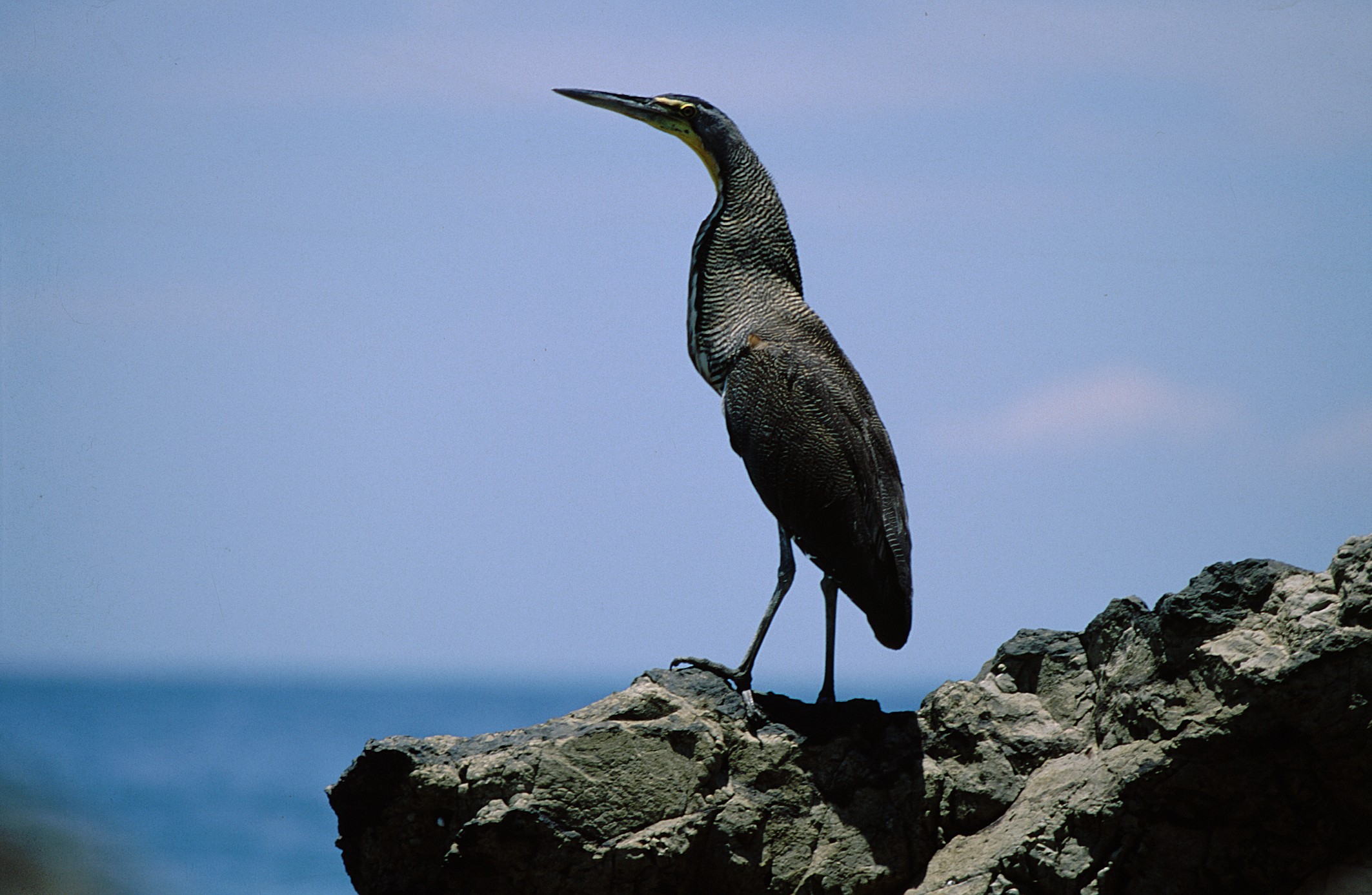
- Bare-throated tiger heron (Tigrisoma mexicanum)

Scientific classification
- Kingdom: Animalia
- Phylum: Chordata
- Class: Aves
- Order: Pelecaniformes
- Family: Ardeidae
- Subfamily: Tigriornithinae; Bock, 1956

= Tigriornithinae =

Subfamily of herons

Tigriornithinae is a subfamily of the heron family Ardeidae that contains the tiger herons.

== Taxonomy ==
- Genus †Taphophoyx (fossil, Late Miocene of Levy County, Florida)
- Genus Tigrisoma – typical tiger herons (three species)
- Genus Tigriornis – white-crested tiger heron
