= George Such =

British ornithologist and physician

- Born: 1798; England
- Died: 1879 (aged 80–81)
- Known for: Collecting bird species in Brazil; describing new genera and species
- Scientific career
- Fields: Medicine, Ornithology
- Author abbrev. (zoology): Such

George Such (1798–1879) was an English physician and ornithologist, and a member of the Linnean Society of London.

He collected bird species in eastern Brazil. During his stay in the country, he was in regular contact with two leading ornithologists of the time: William Swainson and Nicholas Aylward Vigors.

In 1825, he published two papers in the Zoological Journal of London in which he described a new genus, Gubernetes as well as several species:

- Ardea fasciata = Tigrisoma fasciatum
- Dendrocolaptes crassirostris = Xiphocolaptes albicollis
- fortirostris = Dendrocolaptes platyrostris
- Drymophila variegata = Drymophila ferruginea
- Galbula ceycoides = Jacamaralcyon tridactyla
- Thamnophilus leachii = Mackenziaena leachii
- maculatus = Hypoedaleus guttatus
- swainsonii = Mackenziaena severa
- vigorsii = Batara cinerea

Not all of his proposed taxa were retained in later taxonomy.
