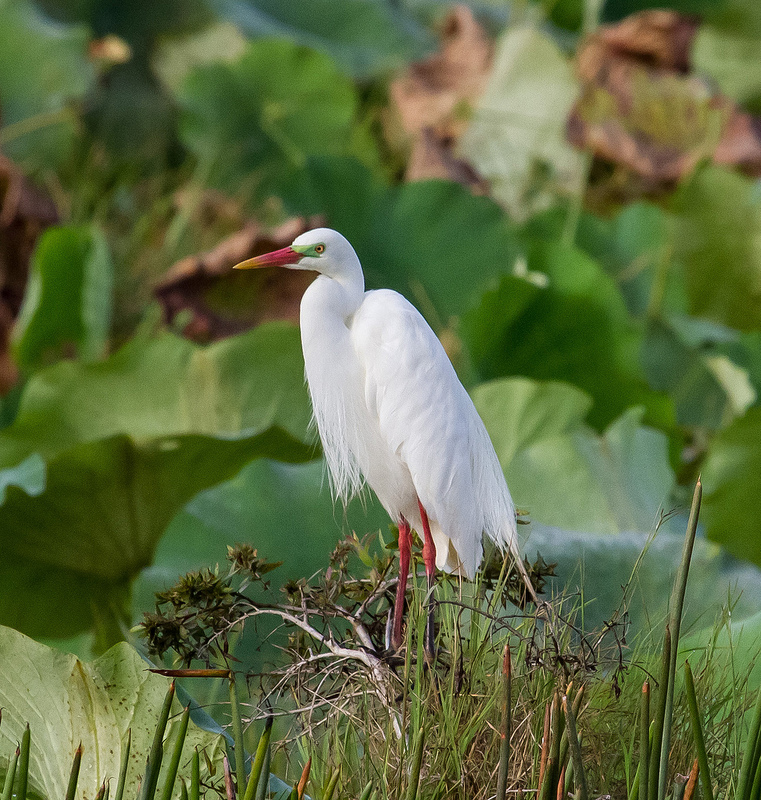
- Plumed egret in breeding plumage, Fogg Dam Conservation Reserve, Northern Territory, Australia

Conservation status
- Least Concern (IUCN 3.1)

Scientific classification
- Kingdom: Animalia
- Phylum: Chordata
- Class: Aves
- Order: Pelecaniformes
- Family: Ardeidae
- Genus: Ardea
- Species: A. plumifera

Binomial name
- Ardea plumifera (Gould, 1848)
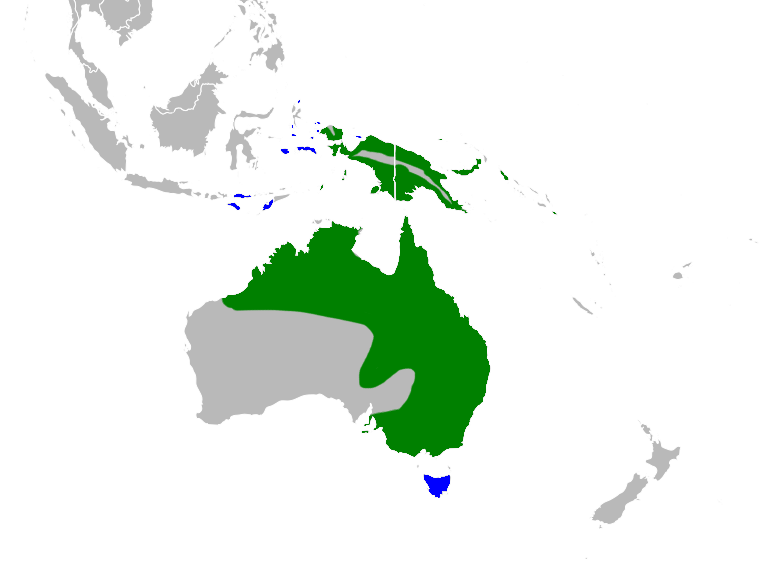
- Resident Non-breeding

Synonyms
- Herodias plumiferus Gould, 1848; Egretta plumifera (Gould, 1848); Mesophyx plumifera (Gould, 1848)

= Plumed egret =

Species of bird

The plumed egret (Ardea plumifera) is a species of heron native to Australia and Oceania. Previously this species was regarded as a subspecies of the intermediate egret (Ardea intermedia sensu lato) alongside the Asian intermediate egret (A. (i.) intermedia) and the African yellow-billed egret (A. (i.) brachyrhyncha).

== Taxonomy ==
The plumed egret was first formally described as Herodias plumiferus by the English ornithologist John Gould with its type locality given as New South Wales. This taxon has been regarded as a subspecies of the intermediate egret (Ardea intermedia) but on 26 September 2023 the International Ornithological Congress recognised the three subspecies of A. intermedia as valid species.

== Description ==
The plumed egret is a medium-sized heron, 56 to 70 cm (22 to 28 in) in length with an all white plumage. In breeding plumage it develops long white frilly plumes from its breast and shoulders. In addition, the bill changes colour to red or orange with green lores and the tibia is red and the tarsus is black. Outside the breeding season the bill is yellow-orange with yellow lores and the legs are black.

== Distribution and habitat ==
The plumed egret is found in Australasia and breeds in eastern Indonesia, Timor-Leste, New Guinea and Australia, with vagrants occurring in New Zealand and the Solomon Islands. This species is found in the shallow water at the edges of freshwater wetlands and the intertidal zone.

== Biology ==
The plumed egret is diurnal, hunting in shallow water for fish, frogs, aquatic insects and crustaceans. In Australia this species breeds in late summer forming colonies in trees. They lay 3-5 pale bluish-green eggs which are incubated by the male and the female and take 24–27 days to hatch. The young fledge in 5 or 6 weeks.
