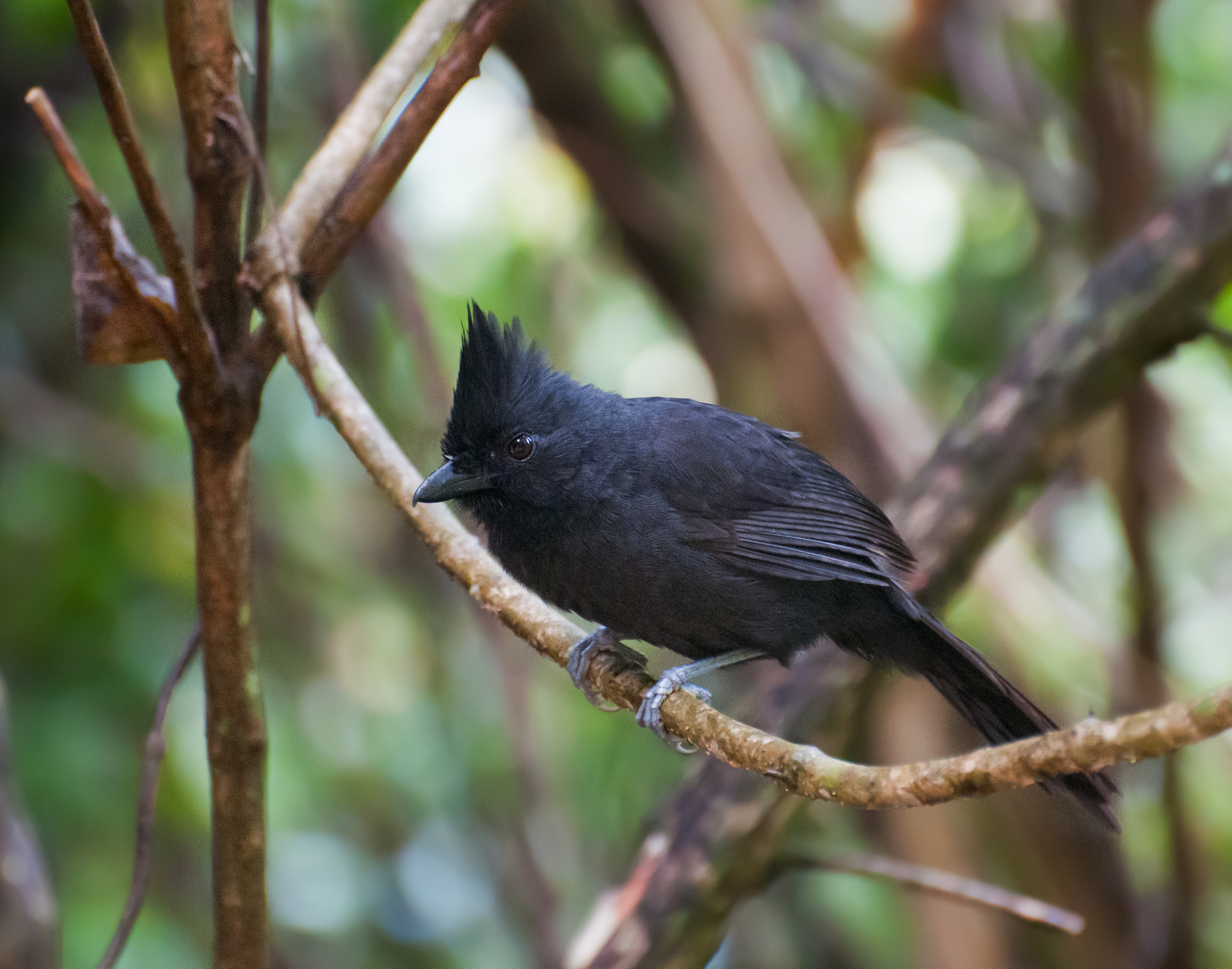
- Male at Piraju, São Paulo State, Brazil
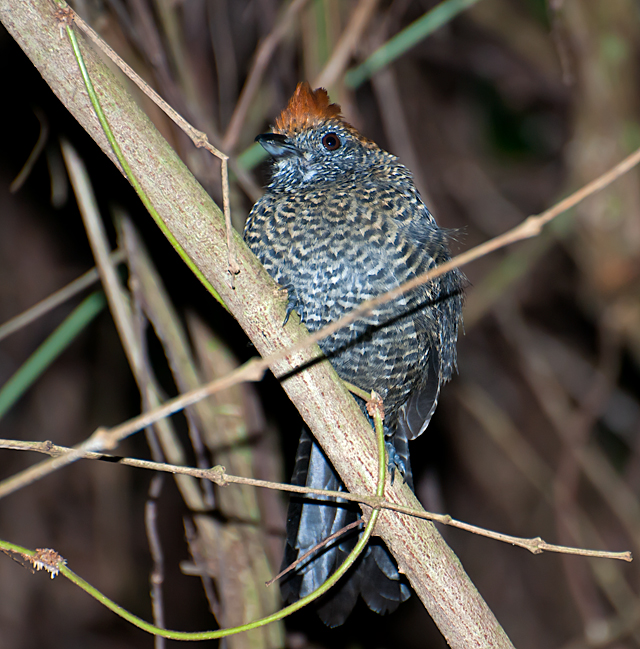
- Female at Piraju, São Paulo State, Brazil

Conservation status
- Least Concern (IUCN 3.1)

Scientific classification
- Kingdom: Animalia
- Phylum: Chordata
- Class: Aves
- Order: Passeriformes
- Family: Thamnophilidae
- Genus: Mackenziaena
- Species: M. severa

Binomial name
- Mackenziaena severa (Lichtenstein, MHC, 1823)

Synonyms
- Lanius severus

= Tufted antshrike =

Species of bird

The tufted antshrike (Mackenziaena severa) is a species of bird in subfamily Thamnophilinae of family Thamnophilidae, the "typical antbirds". It is found in Argentina, Brazil, and Paraguay.

== Taxonomy and systematics ==
The tufted antshrike shares genus Mackenziaena with the large-tailed antshrike (M. leachii). However, there is some doubt about how closely they are related, with evidence that the tufted antshrike is more closely related to the three species of genus Frederickena. Both species are monotypic.

== Description ==
The tufted antshrike is a large dark antbird, 20 to 23 cm (7.9 to 9.1 in) long and weighing 50 to 80 g (1.8 to 2.8 oz). The species exhibits significant sexual dimorphism, though both sexes have a crest (that usually is flattened), red irises, and a moderately long black bill with a hook at the end like true shrikes. Adult males are mostly sooty gray with a blackish forehead and crest and browish black wings. Adult females are mostly blackish brown. Their forehead and crest are rufous, their upperparts have cinnamon bars, their tail has faint paler bars, and their underparts have pale buff bars. Subadult males resemble adult males but are more brownish overall.

== Distribution and habit ==
The tufted antshrike is found in Brazil from southeastern Bahia and east-central Minas Gerais south to Rio Grande do Sul and through eastern Paraguay into northeastern Argentina's Misiones Province. The tufted antshrike is a bird of the Atlantic Forest. It inhabits the understorey to mid-storey of evergreen forest and secondary forest in the lowlands and foothills. It favors areas with dense tangles of vines, thickets, and stands of bamboo. It also occurs in patches of highly degraded forest and also overgrown banana and Eucalyptus plantations and orchards that have dense stands of bamboo. In elevation it ranges from sea level to 1,400 m (4,600 ft).

== Behavior ==
=== Movement ===
The tufted antshrike is presumed to be a year-round resident throughout its range.

=== Feeding ===
The tufted antshrike feeds on a variety of large insects and other arthropods; its diet also includes molluscs and small vertebrates including frogs, lizards, snakes, bird eggs and nestlings. It forages singly or in pairs, mostly within about 3 m (10 ft) of the ground but as high as 10 m (35 ft) in dense bamboo and vine tangles. It hops from branch to branch and along the ground, reaching from a perch to glean prey from leaves, stems, and branches. It occasionally drops to the ground to seize prey.

=== Breeding ===
The tufted antshrike's eggs have been described as having a clear base color with dark lilac spots ang gray lines. Nothing else is known about the species' breeding biology.

=== Vocalization ===
The tufted antshrike's song is a "short, slow, slightly accelerating series of 6-8 very high, slightly rising, strident 'sreek' notes". Its call is a "sudden rising shriek, like 'sreeew' ".

== Status ==
The IUCN originally in 1988 assessed the tufted antshrike as Near Threatened, in 1994 as Unknown, and since 2004 as of Least Concern. It has a largish range; its population size is not known but is believed to be stable. No immediate threats have been identified. It occurs in several protected areas and is "[p]robably less threatened by environmental disturbance than is any of the other large antshrikes endemic in this region".
