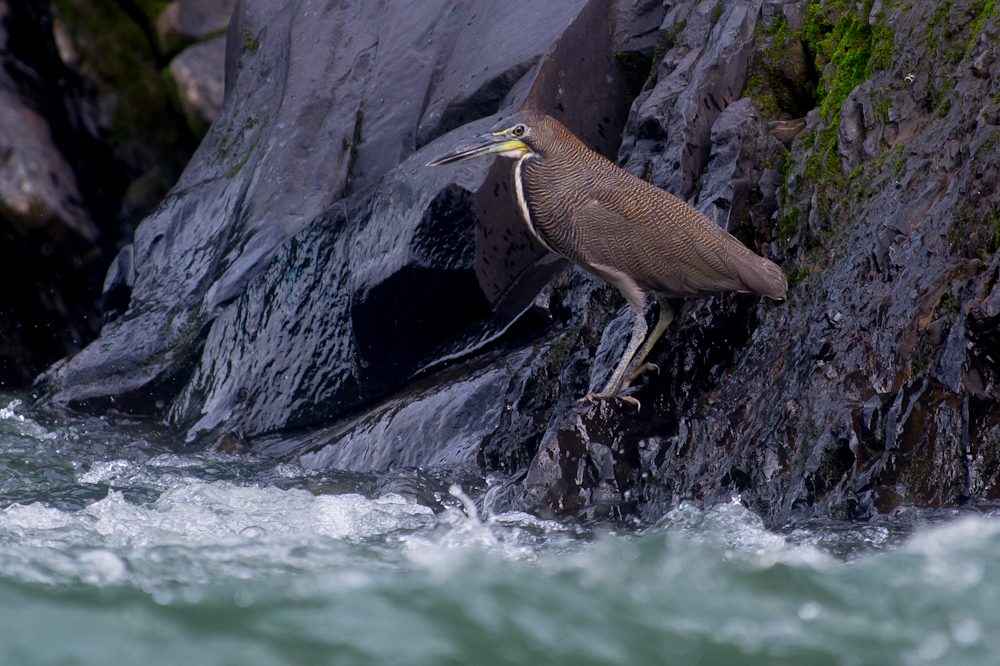

Conservation status
- Least Concern (IUCN 3.1)

Scientific classification
- Kingdom: Animalia
- Phylum: Chordata
- Class: Aves
- Order: Pelecaniformes
- Family: Ardeidae
- Genus: Tigrisoma
- Species: T. fasciatum

Binomial name
- Tigrisoma fasciatum (Such, 1825)
- Range for T. fasciatum

= Fasciated tiger heron =

Species of bird

The fasciated tiger heron (Tigrisoma fasciatum) is a species of heron in the family Ardeidae. It is present in southern Central America and parts of northern and central South America, where its natural habitat is rivers.

In 1988 the fasciated tiger heron was categorized by the IUCN as Near Threatened but as of 2004 they have been recategorized as Least Concern.

== Taxonomy ==
First described as Ardea fasciata by George Such in 1825 from a specimen collected in Serro do Imbé, Brazil, the fasciated tiger heron is now one of three species assigned to the genus Tigrisoma. In the past, it has sometimes been considered as a subspecies of the rufescent tiger heron. It has three subspecies:

- T. f. fasciatum, described by Such in 1825, is found in extreme northeastern Argentina and southeastern Brazil.
- T. f. pallescens, described by Claes C. Olrog in 1950, is found in northwestern Argentina.
- T. f. salmoni, described by Philip Lutley Sclater and Osbert Salvin in 1875, is the most widespread of the subspecies, found on the Caribbean slope in Costa Rica and Panama, east and west of the Andes in Colombia, south through eastern Ecuador, Peru and Bolivia, and in northern Venezuela.

The genus name Tigrisoma is a combination of the Greek words tigris, meaning "tiger" and somā, meaning "body". The species name fasciatum is a late Latin word meaning "banded". Both the scientific name and the common names refer to the fine barring on the upperparts of both adult and immature birds.

== Description ==
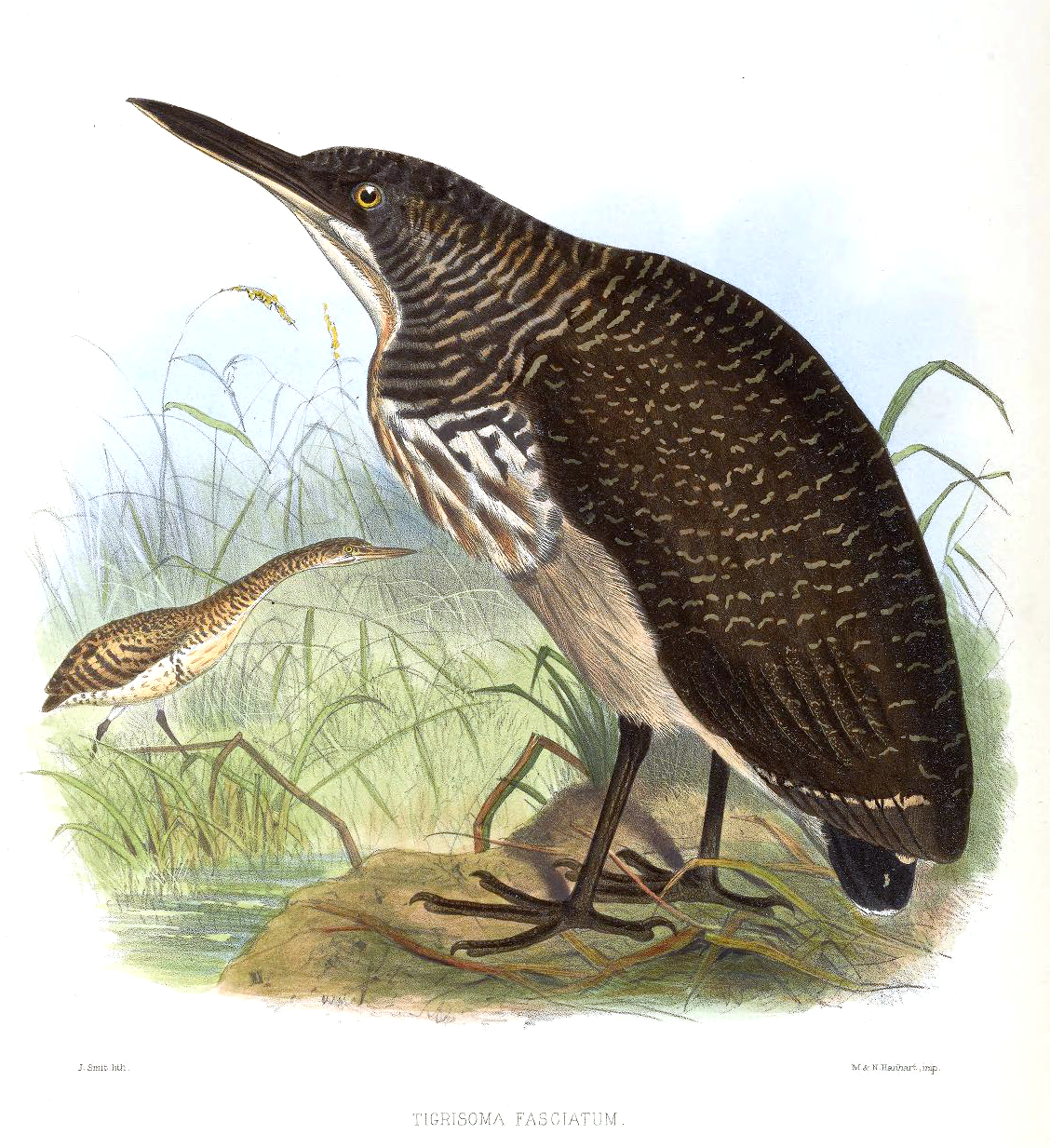
Tigrisoma fasciatum illustrated by Joseph Smit

At 23–25 in (58–64 cm) in length, the fasciated tiger heron is the smallest of the three tiger herons. The adult's crown is black, and the sides of its face are slaty gray. Its neck and upperparts are black, with widely spaced, fine, pale buff stripes. Its abdomen is grayish-cinnamon to warm brown, and its flanks are gray. Its beak, which is shorter and stouter than those of other tiger herons, is black above and yellowish-green below, with a slightly arched culmen. Its irides are yellow.

== Range and habitat ==
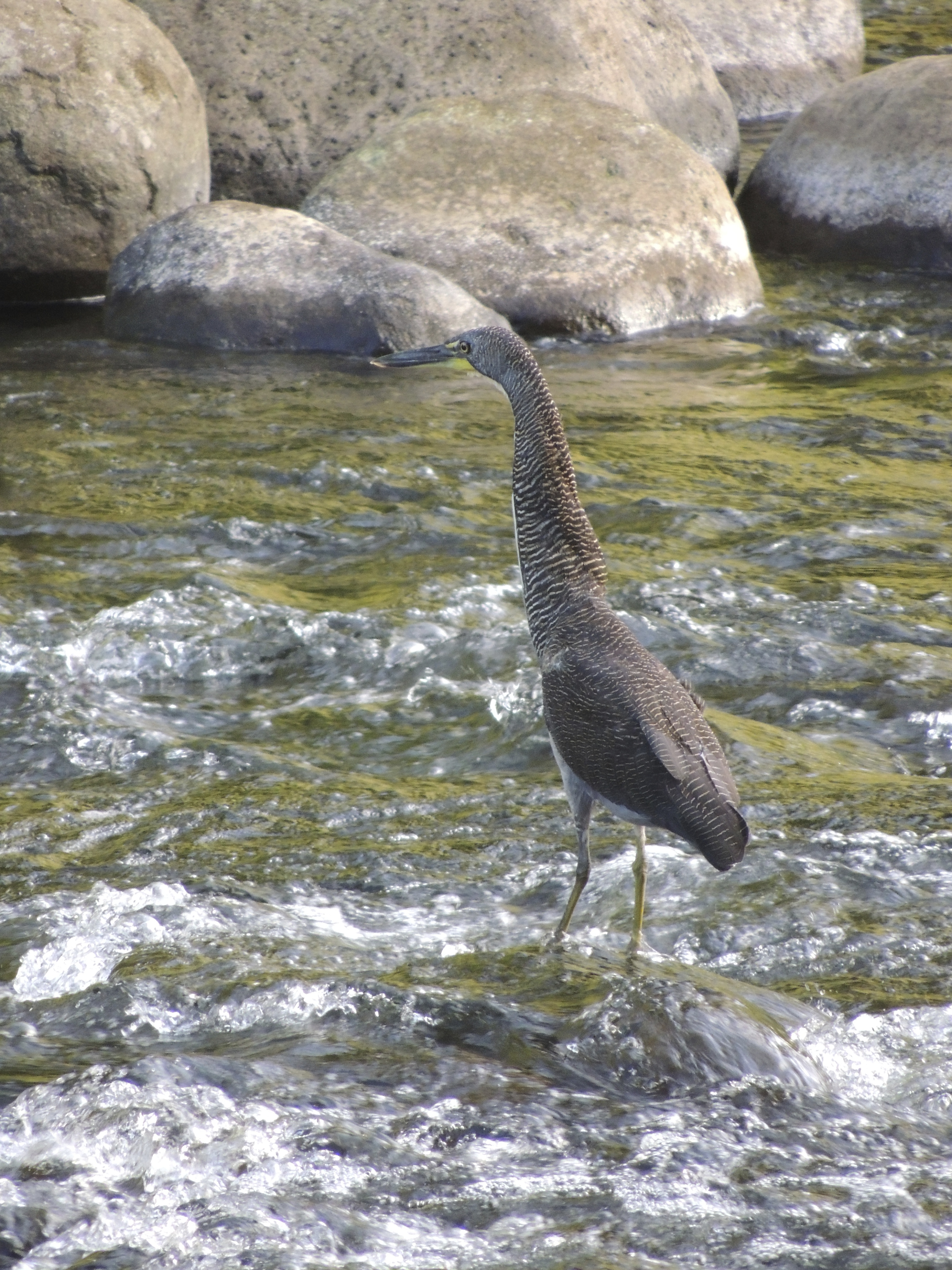
The fasciated tiger heron is typically found along fast-moving streams.

The fasciated tiger heron is found primarily in foothills, along rocky, quickly-moving streams. Its range extends from Costa Rica through northwestern Argentina, southeastern Brazil, and Guyana; it has been recorded as a vagrant in Nicaragua. Although it occurs from sea level to 2,400 ft (730 m), it is generally found at higher elevations than the rufescent tiger heron where the two species occur together.

== Behavior ==
The fasciated tiger heron is typically solitary, though multiple birds may gather at intervals of several hundred yards (meters) in favored fishing areas.

=== Food and feeding ===
It hunts along rivers, standing on the shore or on rocks in the watercourse with its neck partly extended. Its prey is primarily fish, which it catches by stabbing with its beak, though it also takes large insects.

=== Breeding ===
It builds a platform nest of sticks and lianas.

=== Voice ===
Nothing is known about the vocalizations of this species.

== Conservation status and threats ==
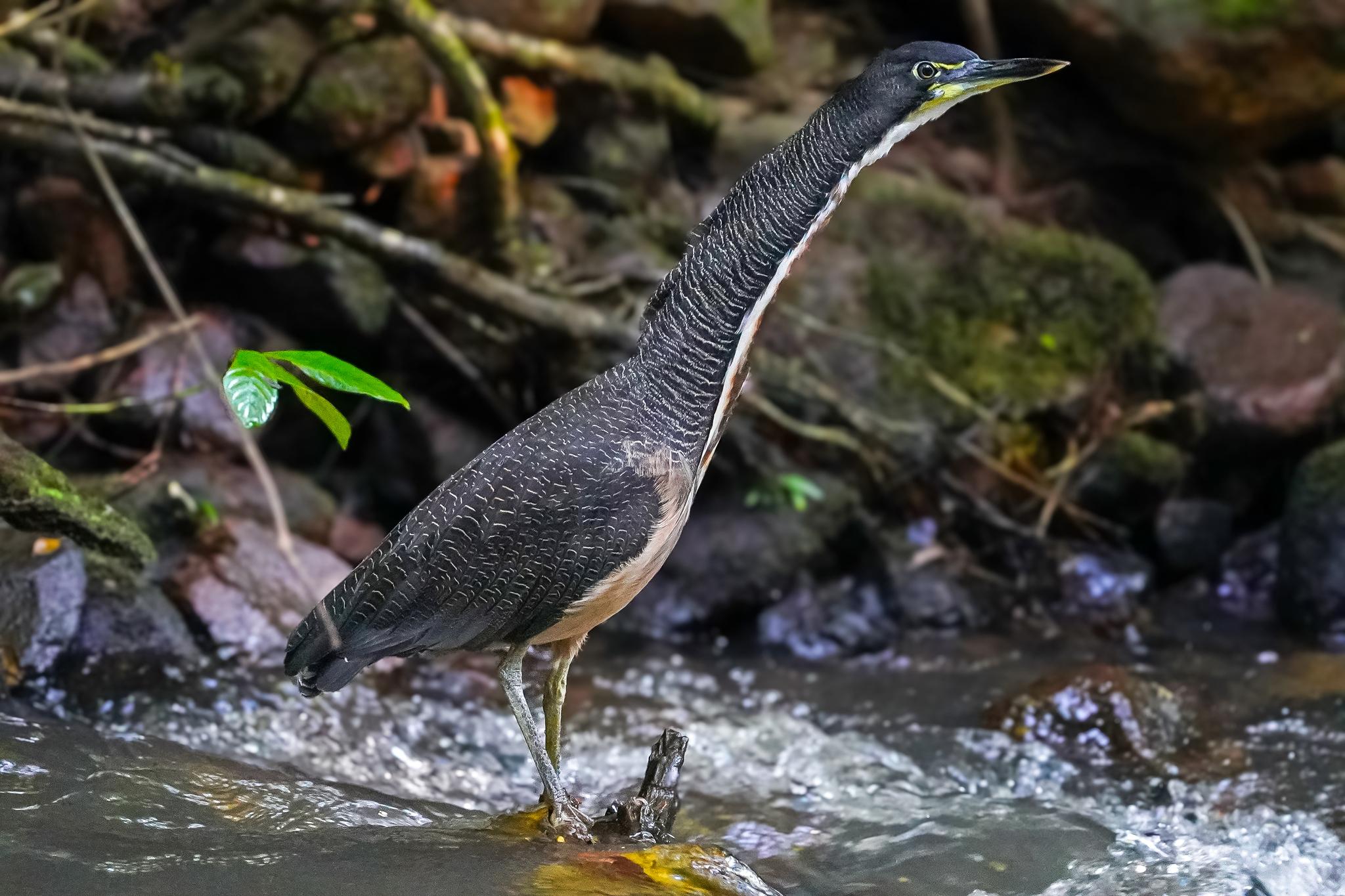
An individual seem in Mato Grosso do Sul, Brazil.

When the International Union for Conservation of Nature released its first listing of the conservation status of the world's species in 1988, the fasciated tiger heron was included as a near threatened species. The bird held that ranking until the 2000 list, when its status was changed to least concern. The estimates of its population are quite low: 1,000–10,000 individuals, some 670–6,700 of which are thought to be mature adults. Its population trend is unknown, due in part to the poor quality of data regarding its numbers, and in part to uncertainty surrounding the impact that habitat modifications might have on the species. However, its range is considerable, spanning foothill regions in southern Central America and much of western South America, with isolated lowland populations in Guyana and eastern South America.

== In human culture ==
There is some evidence that the fasciated tiger heron served as a food item for indigenous peoples in Panama (and possibly elsewhere) in the past. Remains possibly from this species have been found at multiple archeological sites around Panama's Parita Bay. In recent years, it has become a target of the pet trade, with both adults and juveniles being collected from the wild.
