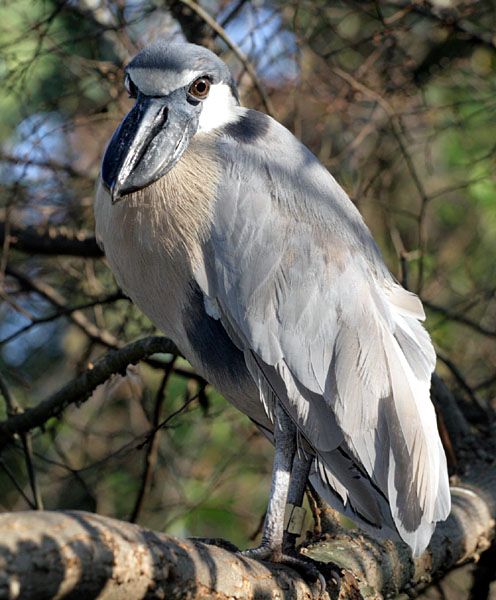
- At Jacksonville Zoo and Gardens, Florida

Conservation status
- Least Concern (IUCN 3.1)

Scientific classification
- Kingdom: Animalia
- Phylum: Chordata
- Class: Aves
- Order: Pelecaniformes
- Family: Ardeidae
- Subfamily: Tigriornithinae
- Genus: Cochlearius; Brisson, 1760
- Species: C. cochlearius

Binomial name
- Cochlearius cochlearius (Linnaeus, 1766)

Synonyms
- Cancroma cochlearia Linnaeus, 1766; Cancroma cancrophaga Linnaeus, 1766

= Boat-billed heron =

Species of bird

Boat-billed heron at ZooTampa at Lowry Park

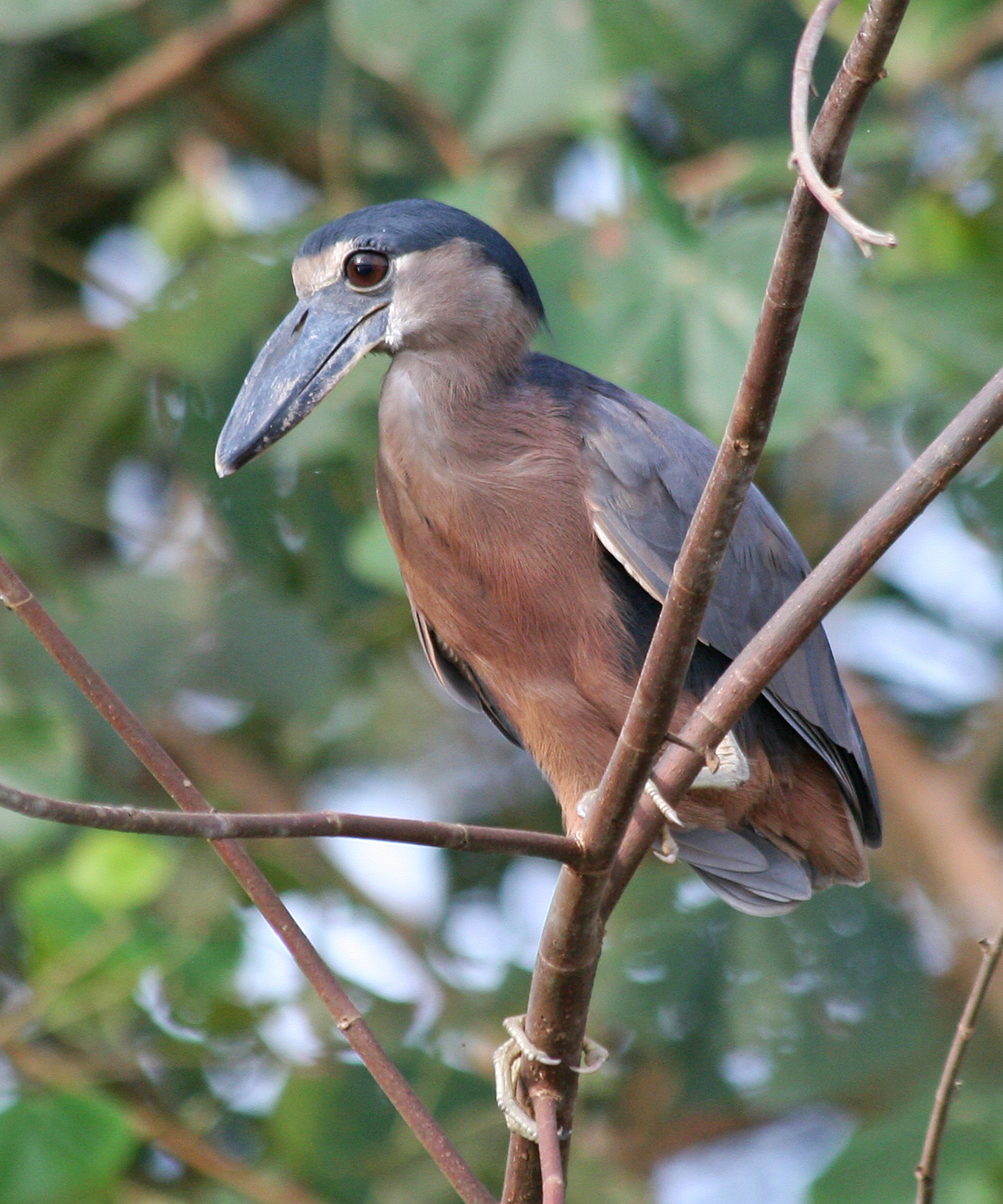
Along the Tarcoles River, Costa Rica

The boat-billed heron (Cochlearius cochlearius), colloquially known as the boatbill, is an atypical member of the heron family. It is the only member of the genus Cochlearius and was formerly placed in a monotypic family, the Cochleariidae. It lives in mangrove swamps from Mexico south to Peru and Brazil. It is a nocturnal bird, and breeds semi-colonially in mangrove trees, laying two to four bluish-white eggs in a twig nest.

== Taxonomy ==
In 1760, the French zoologist Mathurin Jacques Brisson included a description of the boat-billed heron in his Ornithologie based on a specimen collected in French Guiana. He used the French name La Cuillière and the Latin Cochlearius. Brisson placed the species in a new genus Cochlearius (with the same name as that of the species). When in 1766 the Swedish naturalist Carl Linnaeus updated his Systema Naturae for the twelfth edition, he added 240 species that had been previously described by Brisson. One of these was the boat-billed heron. Linnaeus included a brief description, coined the binomial name Cancroma cochlearia, and cited Brisson's work.

Although Brisson coined Latin names, these do not conform to the binomial system and are not recognised by the International Commission on Zoological Nomenclature (ICZN). However, Brisson also introduced names for genera and these are accepted by the ICZN. The boat-billed heron is now placed in Brisson's genus and has the tautonym Cochlearius cochlearius. The name Cochlearius is from the Latin cocleare, coclearis, or cochlearium for a "spoon in the form of a snail shell".

There are five subspecies:

- C. c. zeledoni (Ridgway, 1885) – west Mexico
- C. c. phillipsi Dickerman, 1973 – east Mexico, Belize
- C. c. ridgwayi Dickerman, 1973 – south Mexico to Honduras
- C. c. panamensis Griscom, 1926 – Costa Rica and Panama
- C. c. cochlearius (Linnaeus, 1766) – north and central South America

== Description ==
The boat-billed heron grows to about 54 cm (21 in) long. Adults are pale grey to white in color, with chestnut-colored abdomens and black flanks. The massive, broad, scoop-like bill, which gives rise to this species' name, is mainly black. This bird is also adorned with a crest which is thought to be used in mate attraction as it is larger in males. The sexes are similar in appearance, the main differences being that females are slightly smaller, grayer in appearance, and have shorter crests than males. Newly hatched nestlings have green-yellow skin, with their upperparts covered in gray down feathers. Their upper bill is black, and they have green-yellow legs. Juveniles are darker in color than adults and lack a crest.

== Distribution and habitat ==
Boat-billed herons have a huge native range that reaches from Mexico to Peru, Brazil, and northeastern Argentina. They are nonmigratory birds that tend to live in seasonal lagoons and estuaries, and nest in mangroves.

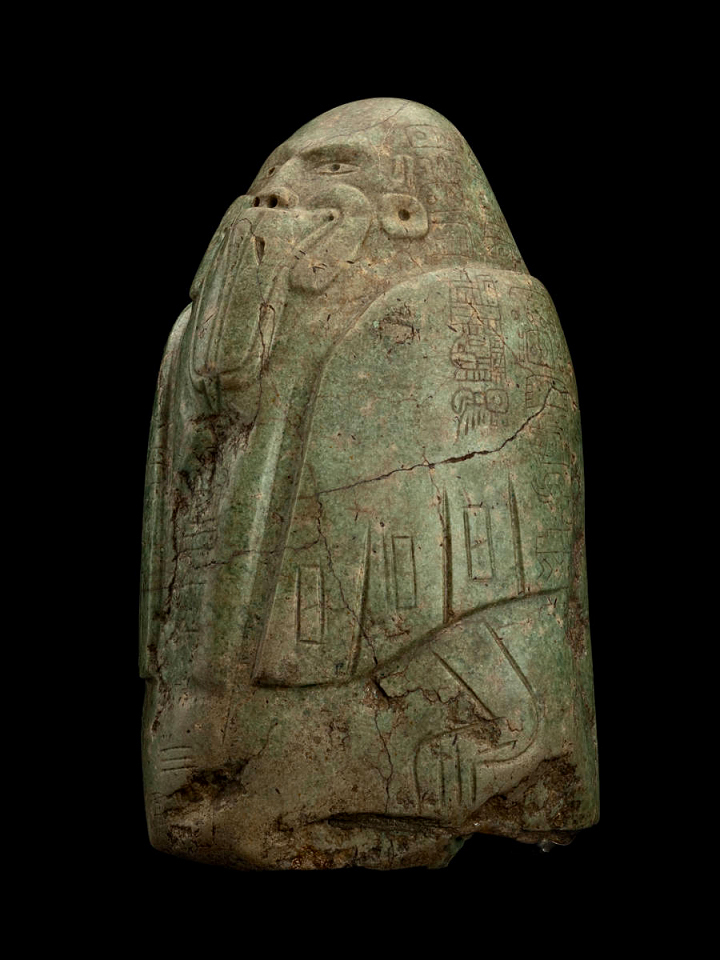
The Tuxtla Statuette, a 2nd-century AD sculpture, is carved in the form of a boat-billed heron.

== Behaviour and ecology ==
=== Breeding ===
Boat-billed herons breed during the rainy season and have been recorded as producing two clutches during this time, laying their first clutch in February during the end of the dry season. Their clutch sizes range from two to four eggs, with more eggs being laid during the first nesting period than the second. They usually nest in colonies but have been observed nesting solitarily. Human disturbance can decrease reproductive success, as herons tend to avoid human contact and will abandon nests if necessary.

=== Food and feeding ===
Boat-billed herons feed on small mammals, amphibians, annelids, molluscs, insects, crabs, shrimp such as Penaeus and Macrobrachium, and small fish such as Dormitator latifrons, a species of sleeper goby. Other fish preyed upon include mullet, snook, and catfish. They tend to forage in vegetative streams, shallow water, and lagoons. When foraging in streams, they use low-hanging branches and mangrove roots to stand over the water. In ponds, they will walk slowly through the water up to 10 cm (4 in) deep or will forage near the water's edge. In order to capture prey they will lunge at fish or scoop the surface of the water with their bills, which are uniquely shaped for this method of capture. Additionally, they have been observed using two different feeding techniques: standing and slowly stalking prey, or disturbing the water and chasing prey. Boat-billed herons will forage nocturnally and have been seen leaving the roost 30 minutes after sundown to feed. It has been observed that they do not feed when a light source is present such as daylight, moonlight, or artificial light. One study hypothesized that in order to forage for food in the dark and in shallow, muddy water, their bills are sensitive to touch, which helps them feel for their prey.
