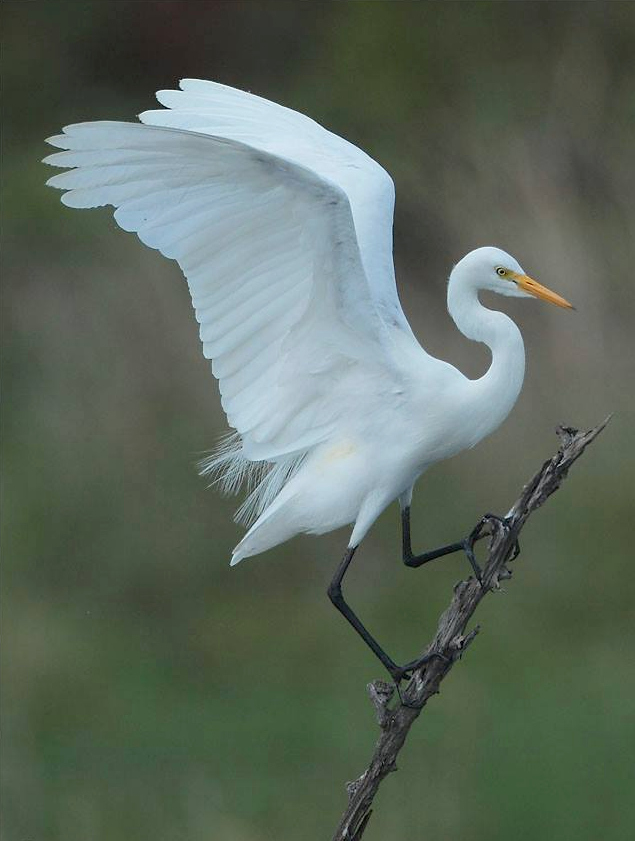

Conservation status
- Least Concern (IUCN 3.1)

Scientific classification
- Kingdom: Animalia
- Phylum: Chordata
- Class: Aves
- Order: Pelecaniformes
- Family: Ardeidae
- Genus: Ardea
- Species: A. brachyrhyncha

Binomial name
- Ardea brachyrhyncha (Brehm, AE, 1854)
- Range of the yellow-billed egret (Ardea brachyrhyncha)

Synonyms
- Herodias brachyrhynchus Brehm, 1854; Ardea intermedia brachyrhyncha (Brehm, 1854); Egretta brachyrhyncha (Brehm, 1854); Egretta intermedia brachyrhyncha (Brehm, 1854); Mesophoyx brachyrhyncha (Brehm, 1854); Mesophoyx intermedia brachyrhyncha (Brehm, 1854); Ardea brachyrhyncha (Brehm, 1854)

= Yellow-billed egret =

Species of bird

The yellow-billed egret (Ardea brachyrhyncha) is a species of heron, a medium sized heron. This species is found in Sub-Saharan Africa. Until 2023 the yellow-billed egret was regarded as a subspecies of the intermediate egret (A. (i.) intermedia) of Asia, as was the plumed egret (A. (i.) plumifera) of Australia and Oceania.

== Taxonomy ==
The yellow-billed egret was first formally described as Herodias brachyrynchus by the German zoologist Alfred Brehm with its type locality given as the Blue Nile (blauen Flusse). This taxon has been regarded as a subspecies of the intermediate egret (Ardea intermedia) but on 26 September 2023 the International Ornithological Congress recognised the three subspecies of A. intermedia as valid species.

== Description ==
The yellow-billed egret has a length of 61 to 69 cm (24 to 27 in) and is white, resembling the great egret (A. alba) but differs in having a smaller bill and a gape which does not extend beyond the eye. In breeding plumage the yellow-billed egret grows long plumes on its back and breast and the normally yellow bill becomes orange red. The bill may have a black tip outside the breeding season. The lower legs and toes are dusky while the tibia is paler, becoming pinkish red for a short period during courtship before changing to yellow for the rest of the breeding season. The lores are yellow and, again, these change colour in the breeding season when they become green when the eyes also change from yellow to bright red. The breeding colour of the bare parts reverts to normal soon after the eggs are laid.

== Distribution ==
The yellow-billed egret is found in Africa south of the Sahara Desert from southern Mauretania and Sudan south to the Western Cape in South Africa, avoiding areas of desert and dense tropical forest. It has been recorded as a vagrant in the Seychelles and the Cape Verde Islands.

== Habitat ==
The yellow-billed egret is typically encountered in seasonally inundated wetlands and grasslands as well as on the shallow edges of lakes, rivers, salt pans and in estuaries.

== Biology ==
Yellow-billed egrets are generally regarded as residents but they are known to undertake local movements to find more favourable conditions when water levels change. This egret feeds mainly on fish and frogs, less so on both aquatic and terrestrial invertebrates. It can be gregarious, associating in loose flocks of 15-20 birds, although it is often found singly. It is often found in association with other egrets, roosting at night in trees, including mangroves. Breeding occurs in mixed, often large colonies in trees over water or swamp. The nest is made of sticks, rushes and reeds, is lined with grass and is built in trees, bushes or reedbeds. A small area around the nest is defended from other yellow-billed egrets. The nesting season is during or immediately after the rains and both parents incubate the eggs.
