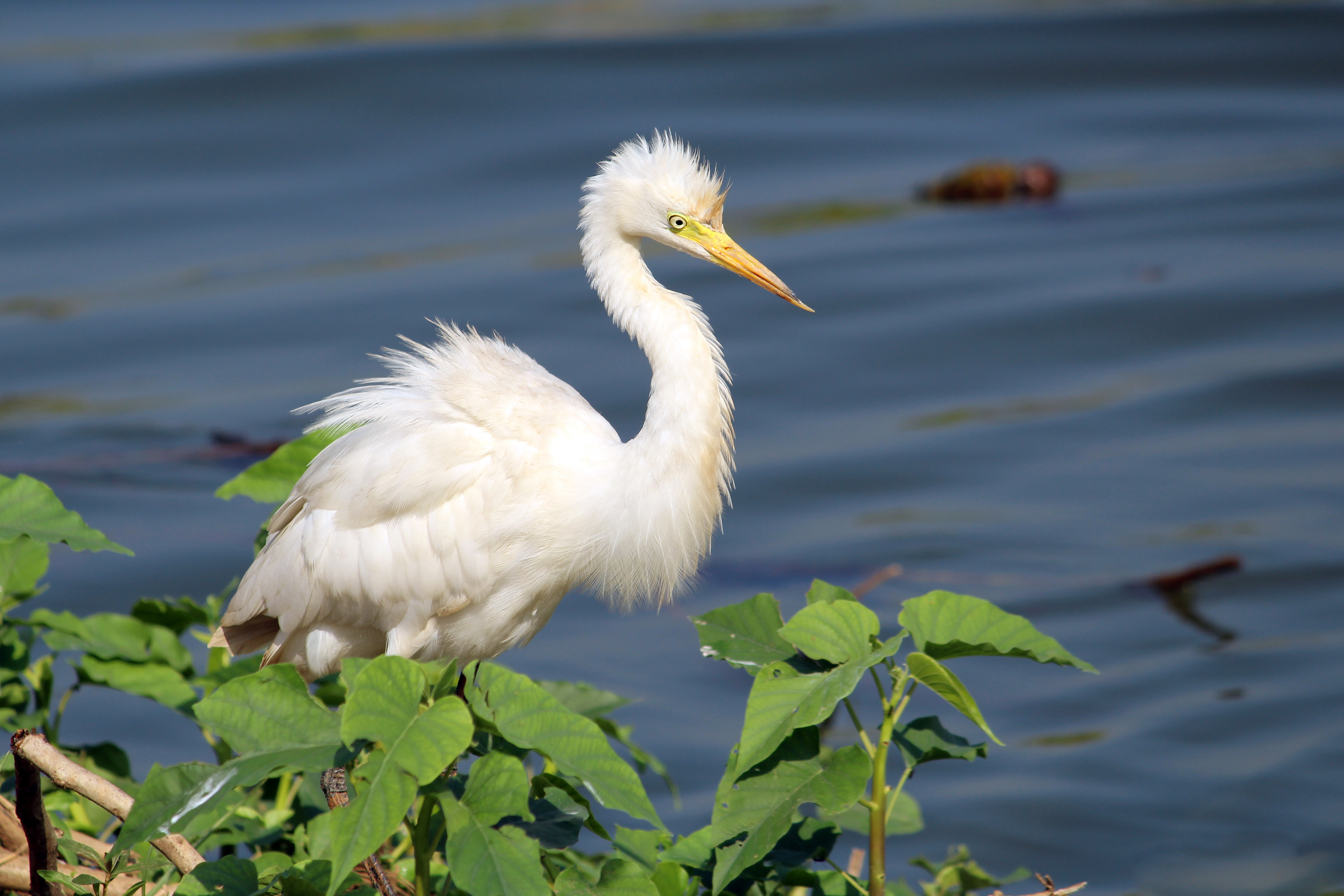
- In Thrissur, India

Conservation status
- Least Concern (IUCN 3.1)

Scientific classification
- Kingdom: Animalia
- Phylum: Chordata
- Class: Aves
- Order: Pelecaniformes
- Family: Ardeidae
- Genus: Ardea
- Species: A. intermedia

Binomial name
- Ardea intermedia Wagler, 1829
- Breeding range Non-breeding range Year-round

Synonyms
- Mesophoyx intermedia (Wagler, 1827); Egretta intermedia (Wagler, 1827)

= Medium egret =

Species of bird

The medium egret (Ardea intermedia), median egret, smaller egret or intermediate egret, is a medium-sized heron. Some taxonomists put the species in the genus Egretta or Mesophoyx. It is a resident breeder in southern and eastern Asia.

== Taxonomy ==
Some authorities classify the intermediate egret species complex in its own monotypic genus, Mesophoyx, while others place it with the smaller egrets in Egretta.

There were three recognised subspecies, and these are sometimes raised into species:

- A. i. brachyrhyncha Brehm, 1854 "yellow-billed egret" - sub-Saharan Africa
- A.i. intermedia Wagler, 1827 "intermediate egret" - Asia from the Russian Far East to Japan to India and the Greater Sundas
- A. i. plumifera Gould, 1848 "plumed egret" - eastern Indonesia, New Guinea and Australia.

A.(i.) intermedia differs from A.(i.) brachyrhyncha and A. (i.) plumifera by having a black bill when in breeding plumage, while A.(i.) plumifera has a yellow-and-pink bill and A. (i.) brachyrhyncha has much yellower lores and face. A further difference between this species and the "yellow-billed" species is that the intermediate egret has black at the top of the legs compared to reddish in the yellow-billed egret.

The split of intermediate egret into 3 species was accepted by the IOC on 26 September 2023, this form was given the common name medium egret by the IOC.

== Description ==
The medium egret, as its scientific name implies, is intermediate in size between the great egret and smaller white egrets like the little egret and cattle egret, though nearer to little than great. It is about 56–72 cm (22–28 in) long with a 105–115 cm (41–45 in) wingspan and weighs c. 400 g (14 oz), with all-white plumage, generally dark legs and a thickish yellow bill. Breeding birds may have a reddish or black bill, greenish yellow gape skin, loose filamentous plumes on their breast and back, and dull yellow or pink on their upper legs (regional variations). The sexes are similar.

=== Differences from other egrets ===
Sketch comparing gapes of intermediate and great egrets

The medium egret has non-breeding colours which are similar to other white egrets, but the intermediate is smaller, with neck length a little less than body length, a slightly domed head, and a shorter, thicker bill. The great egret has a noticeable kink near the middle of its neck, and the top of its longer bill nearly aligns with the flat top of its head. Close up, great egret's gape line extends behind the eye, while the intermediate's is less pointed and ends below the eye. The intermediate tends to stalk upright with neck extended forward. The great is more patient, often adopting a sideways-leaning "one-eyed" stance. Little egrets have yellow-soled feet and black bills. They often run after fish in shallow water. Breeding birds have long nuptial plumes on the back of their heads.

== Behaviour ==
The medium egret stalks its prey methodically in shallow coastal or fresh water, including flooded fields. It eats fish, frogs, crustaceans and insects. It often nests in colonies with other herons, usually on platforms of sticks in trees or shrubs. The typical clutch size is 2 or 3 eggs but there can be as many as 6 eggs in a clutch, the colour of the eggs is pale green, with a smooth, slightly pitted shell. Both parents incubate the eggs and they hatch after between 24 and 27 days. The eggs hatch asynchronously, after hatching the adults brood the semialtricial young for 12 days, defending the nests from aerial predators during both incubation and brooding, they crouch over the nest and raise their plumes and point their bill towards the threat. The parents regurgitate food to feed the young, initially onto the floor of the nest but later the chick takes the food from the parent's mouth. There may be competition for food within the brood. Pinfeathers may appear on the chicks as early as 4 days old and the young are able to leave the nest at 24 days old, although they return to be fed. Fledging occurs at around 40 days old and they leave the colony after 70 days. Intermediate egret populations are more successful in wet years than in dry years.

== Gallery ==
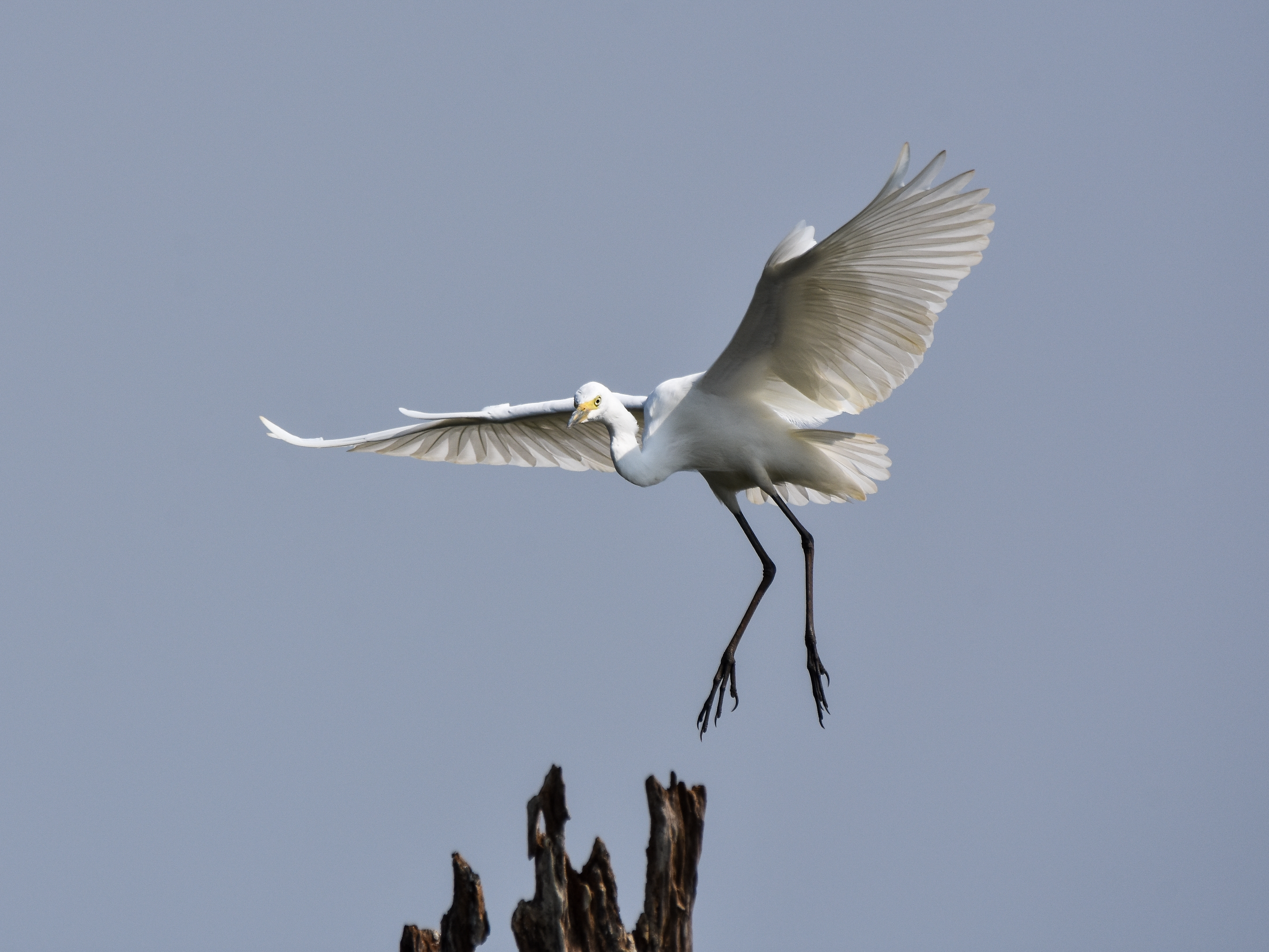
Descending to perch, Kabini River, India

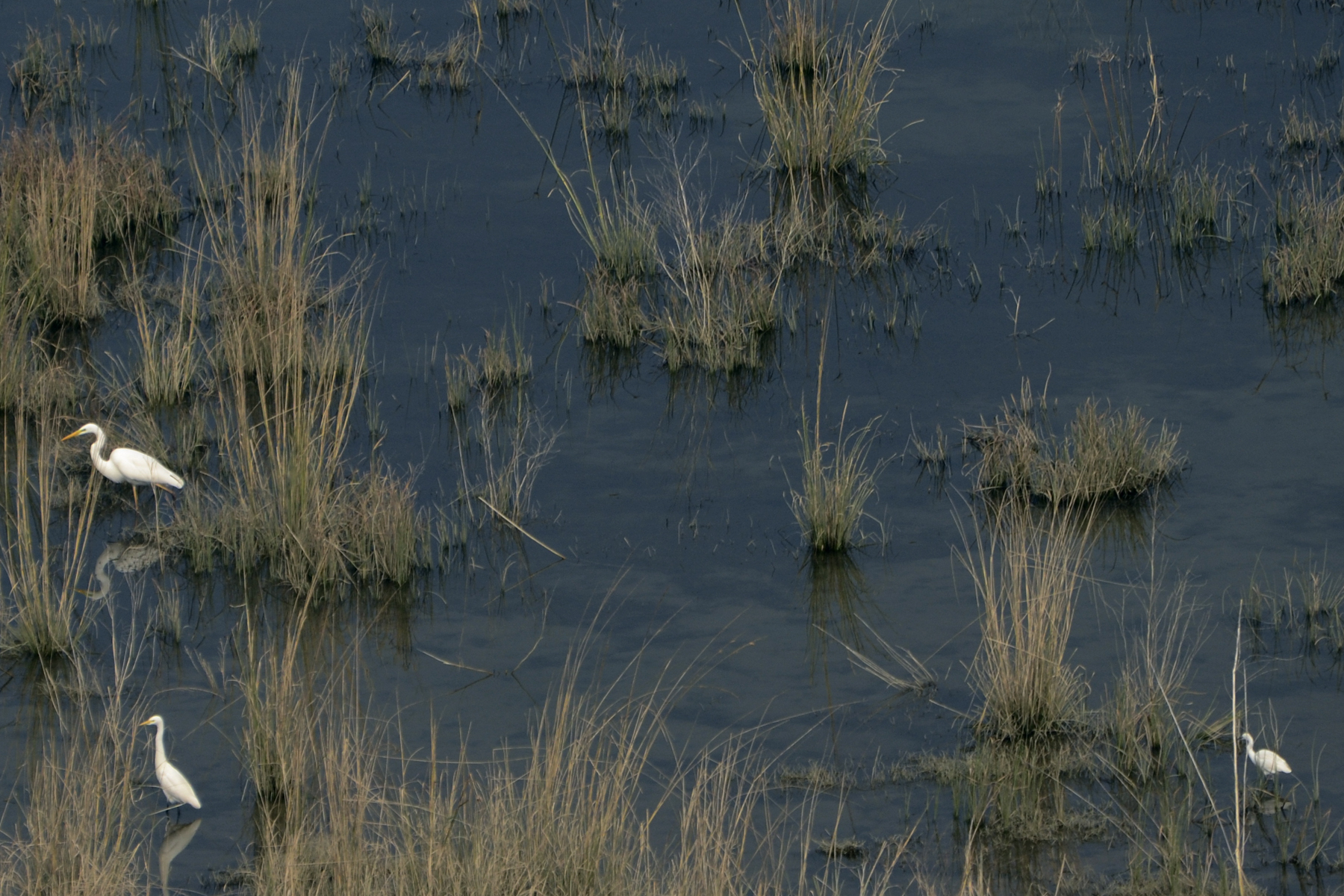
Photo showing the size difference in great, medium and little egrets, India
