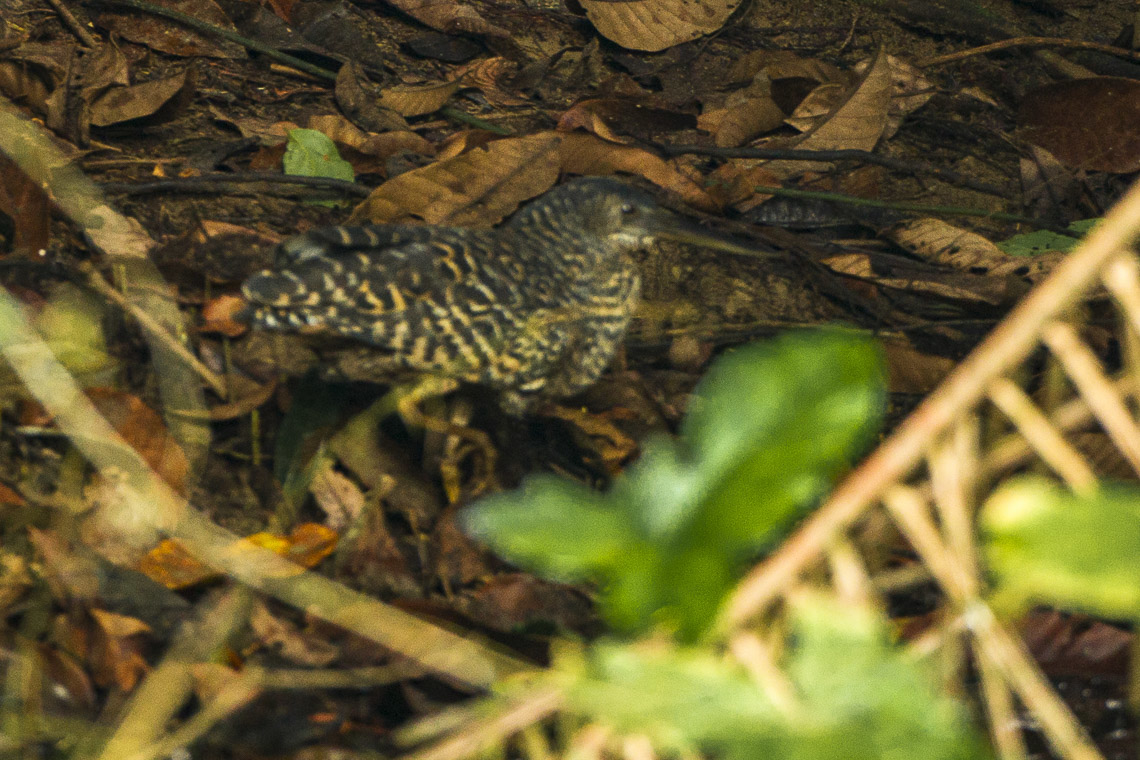

Conservation status
- Least Concern (IUCN 3.1)]\

Scientific classification
- Kingdom: Animalia
- Phylum: Chordata
- Class: Aves
- Order: Pelecaniformes
- Family: Ardeidae
- Subfamily: Tigriornithinae
- Genus: Tigriornis; Sharpe, 1895
- Species: T. leucolopha

Binomial name
- Tigriornis leucolopha (Jardine, 1846)

Synonyms
- Tigriornis leucolophus (Jardine, 1846)

= White-crested tiger heron =

Species of bird

The white-crested tiger heron (Tigriornis leucolopha), also known as the white-crested bittern, is a species of heron in the monotypic genus Tigriornis and a member of the family Ardeidae. It is widely distributed across the African tropical rainforest, often occurring near small streams and marshes. This heron exhibits unobtrusive black, brown and buff coloration and possesses a white crest, which may be viewed when erected. Not much is known about this heron or its behaviors, although it is known to feed on the small fish, crustaceans, frogs, snakes and insects which inhabit rivers or river shores. Despite its elusiveness, it is found over a broad range and has been assessed by the International Union for Conservation of Nature as "Least Concern". Due to threats such as habitat destruction and poaching for use in medicine, its population has been decreasing over time.

== Description ==
The white-crested tiger heron possesses a distinct appearance, including a slender elongated body, standing at around 66 to 80 centimeters (26 to 31 inches) tall. Its plumage is relatively dull, and consists of brown, buff and rufous plumage, along with black barring. The exception to its dull plumage lies in its brilliant white crest, although not much is known about its uses. The nape along with the sides of its head and neck are light rufous with black barring, while the mantle, scapulars and rump possess rufous, buff and brown coloration, with bold black bars. Females possess a more dull coloration, including narrow buff barring and a pink cinnamon coloration on the underside. The legs, along with the eye and part of the bill are yellow with black highlights. Chicks originally possess yellow down, which turns to white before molting.

== Taxonomy ==
This bird was first described in 1846 by Scottish ornithologist and naturalist Sir William Jardine, who classified it as "Tigrornis leucolophus." However, it was only fully taxonomized around 50 years later in 1895, by English zoologist and ornithologist Richard Bowdler Sharpe. Sharpe designated Tigrornis as a monotypic genus, rather than categorizing the heron into another genus such as Tigrosoma, which contains other birds also described as 'tiger herons.' Sharpe also renamed the heron "Tigrornis leucolopha," as opposed to "leucolophus." This classification stands to this day.

== Distribution and habitat ==
This heron ranges throughout a large expanse of western and central Africa, spanning across the African tropical rainforest. It is not migratory, and spends nearly all of its time along bodies of streams, marshes and swampy areas within the forest. However, incidents of vagrancy have been reported in the country of Mauritania.

== Behavior ==
Due to its elusiveness, not much is known regarding this heron's behavioral aspects. However, this bird has been seen regularly foraging near water in dense lowland forests and mangrove ecosystems. It is a carnivorous solitary feeder, primarily foraging for a wide range of fish, crabs, crayfish, frogs, snakes, spiders and insects. This heron is primarily nocturnal and is most active at dawn and dusk. Its booming call is similar to most large bitterns, and it may take the form of a single- or double-noted sound. When disturbed, the heron exhibits a bittern posture, pointing its bill up while stretching out its wings. This heron is largely sedentary, despite certain reports of migratory movements or vagrancy.

Very little is known of this bird's breeding habits, although it is speculated that these birds nest during the rainy season. Egg laying dates vary greatly, and have been documented as September–October in Sierra Leone, October in Liberia, May in Cameroon and January in Gabon. Eggs have been observed during separate periods from September–October to December–January. The periods in which hatchlings have been observed also varies greatly. Hatchlings have been documented during the periods of October, December–January and May–June. Only three nests have been described to date, all featuring fragile platforms of twigs 2 to 6 meters (6.6 to 19.7 ft) above water. Reports of eggs have described their coloration as beige-yellow with purple, blue-gray and reddish-brown markings. These eggs have been reported as 55 by 45 millimeters (2.2 by 1.8 inches) in size, and the incubation period has been documented at around 29 days long.

== Status ==
Due to the elusiveness of this bird, little is known regarding its conservation status. Despite this, it has been assessed repeatedly by the IUCN Red List, and was given the conservation status of Least Concern in 2005. However, the heron is only classified as Least Concern due to the fact that it does not meet the thresholds for "Vulnerable." This is solely due to the range size, although population dynamics may also be a contributing factor. As of 2018, the population has been estimated at 25,000 to 100,000 individuals. The species has also been assessed as a declining population do to habitat loss, although this is subject to further confirmation. Habitat loss functions as the most significant threat to this species, along with poaching for use in medicine.
