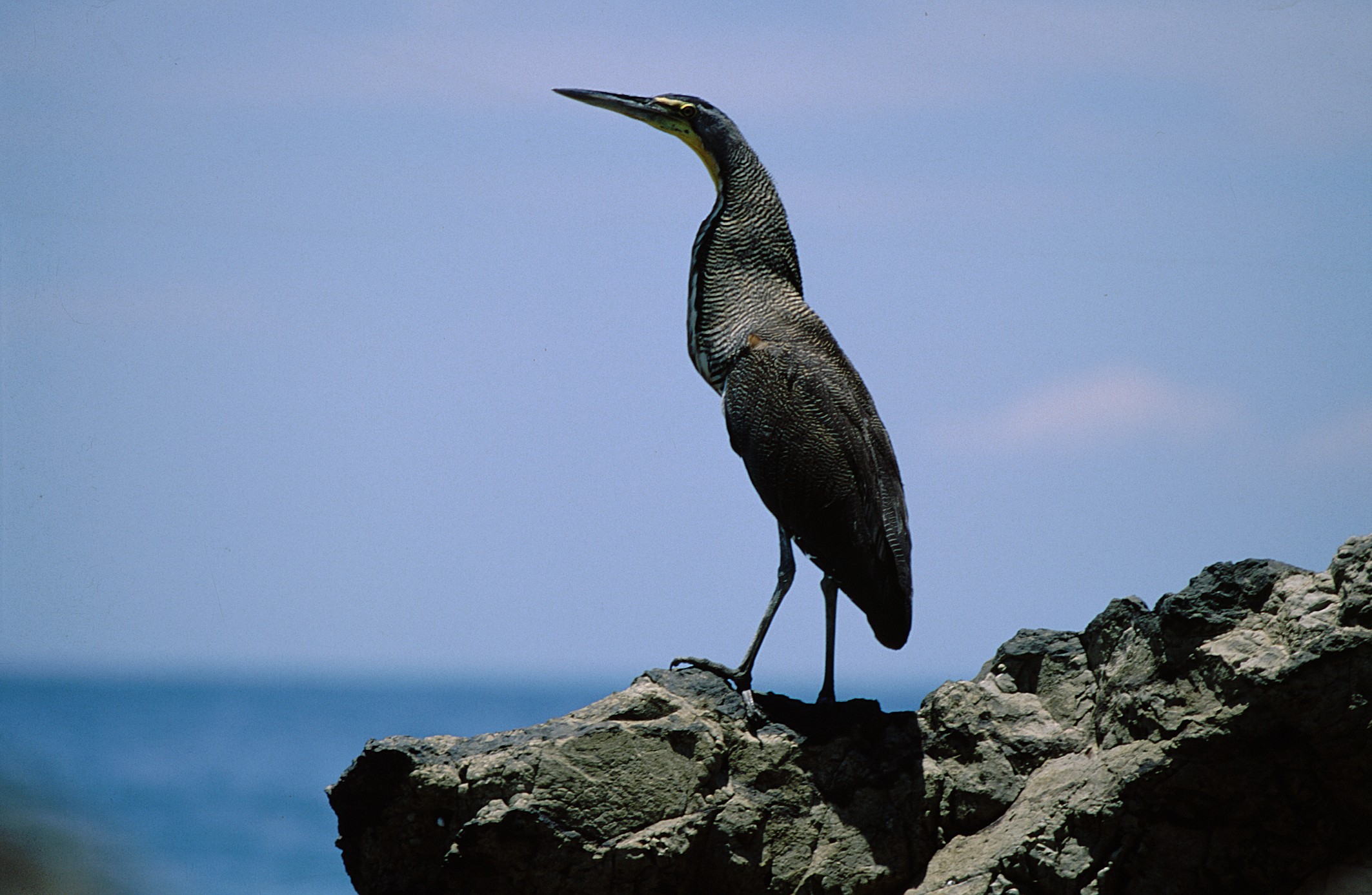
- Bare-throated tiger heron (Tigrisoma mexicanum)

Scientific classification
- Domain: Eukaryota
- Kingdom: Animalia
- Phylum: Chordata
- Class: Aves
- Order: Pelecaniformes
- Family: Ardeidae
- Subfamily: Tigriornithinae
- Genus: Tigrisoma; Swainson, 1827

Type species
- Ardea tigrina

= Tigrisoma =

Genus of birds

Tigrisoma is a genus of herons in the family Ardeidae.

The genus was erected by the English naturalist William Swainson in 1827, with the rufescent tiger heron (Tigrisoma lineatum) as the type species. The genus name combines the Ancient Greek tigris, meaning "tiger" and sôma, meaning "body".

== Species ==
Three species are placed in the genus:

Image	Name	Common name	Distribution
	Tigrisoma mexicanum	Bare-throated tiger heron	from Mexico to northwestern Colombia, with one recorded sighting from the United States in Hidalgo County, Texas
	Tigrisoma fasciatum	Fasciated tiger heron	from Costa Rica through northwestern Argentina, southeastern Brazil, and Guyana; it has been recorded as a vagrant in Nicaragua
	Tigrisoma lineatum	Rufescent tiger heron	Central America through much of South America

Beautiful in flight, with great markings on the feathers. Nest mostly resembles a jumbled pile of twigs with openings large enough to allow eggs to fall through occasionally. Call sounds like a sick cow. A contrast in elegance and coarseness.
