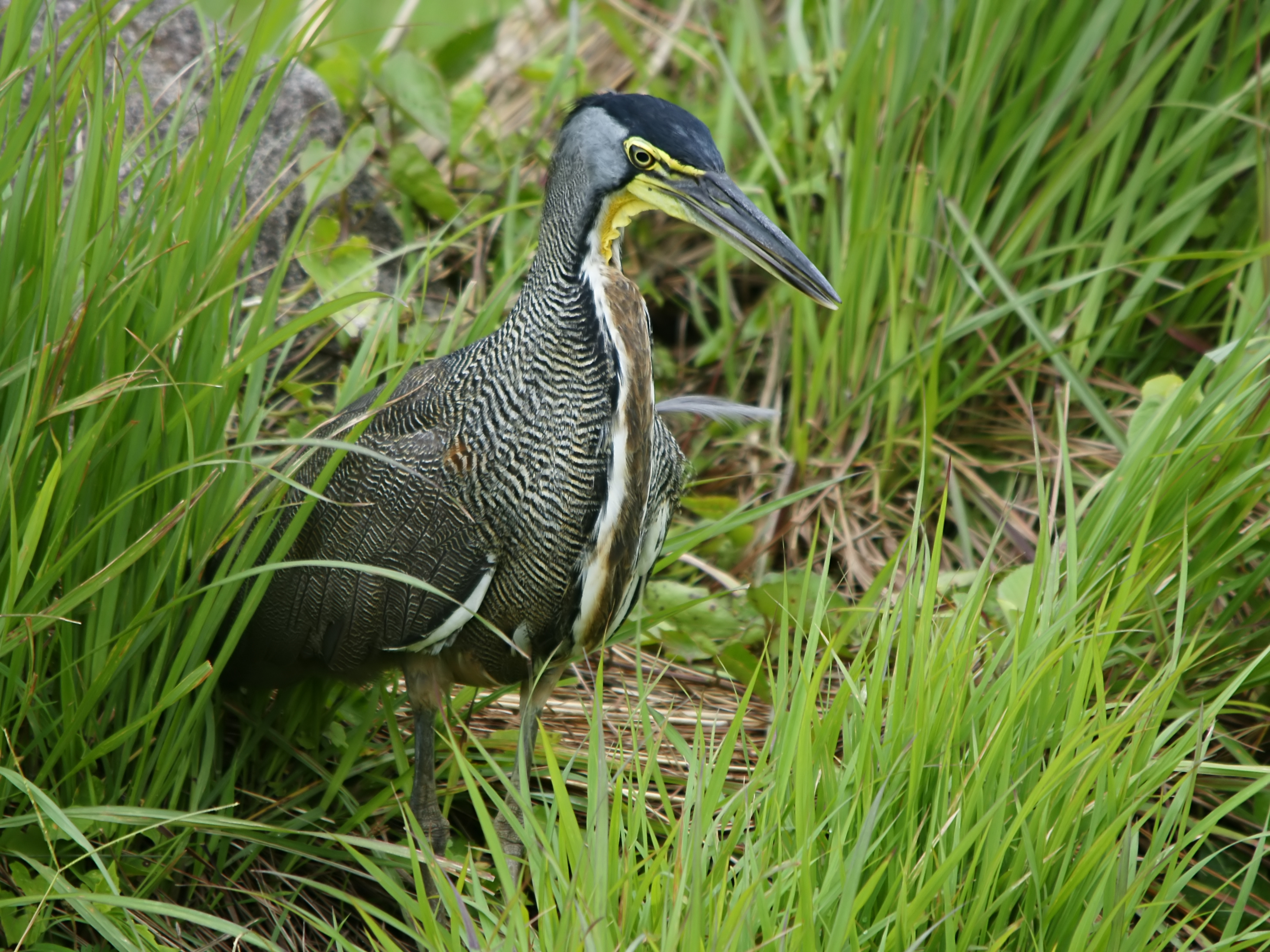
- Adult

Conservation status
- Least Concern (IUCN 3.1)

Scientific classification
- Kingdom: Animalia
- Phylum: Chordata
- Class: Aves
- Order: Pelecaniformes
- Family: Ardeidae
- Genus: Tigrisoma
- Species: T. mexicanum

Binomial name
- Tigrisoma mexicanum Swainson, 1834
- Bare-throated tiger heron range

= Bare-throated tiger heron =

Species of bird

The bare-throated tiger heron (Tigrisoma mexicanum) is a wading bird of the heron family, Ardeidae, found from Mexico to northwestern Colombia, with one recorded sighting from the United States in Hidalgo County, Texas. It is 80 cm (31 in) in length and weighs 1,200 g (42 oz).

This large species is found in more open habitats than other Tigrisoma herons, such as river and lake banks. It waits often motionless for suitable prey such as fish, frogs or crabs to come within reach of its long bill.

This is a solitary breeder, not normally found in heron colonies. The nest is a small flattish stick platform in a tree into which 2–3 green-tinged white eggs are laid.

== Description ==
The throat is bare and is greenish-yellow to orange in all plumages. The adult has black crown and light grey sides of the head, the sides of the neck and the upperparts otherwise blackish narrowly barred buff. The median stripe down the fore-neck is white-bordered with black; the remaining underparts are dull cinnamon brown. The juvenile is buff coarsely barred with black, more mottled and vermiculated on wings; the throat, median underparts, and belly are whitish.

The flight is heavy, and the call is a hoarse howk-howk-howk. Males also give a booming hrrrowwr! call, especially at sunset. During emission of the call, the beak opens wide and undulations can be seen along the course of the throat from mid-thorax caudally.

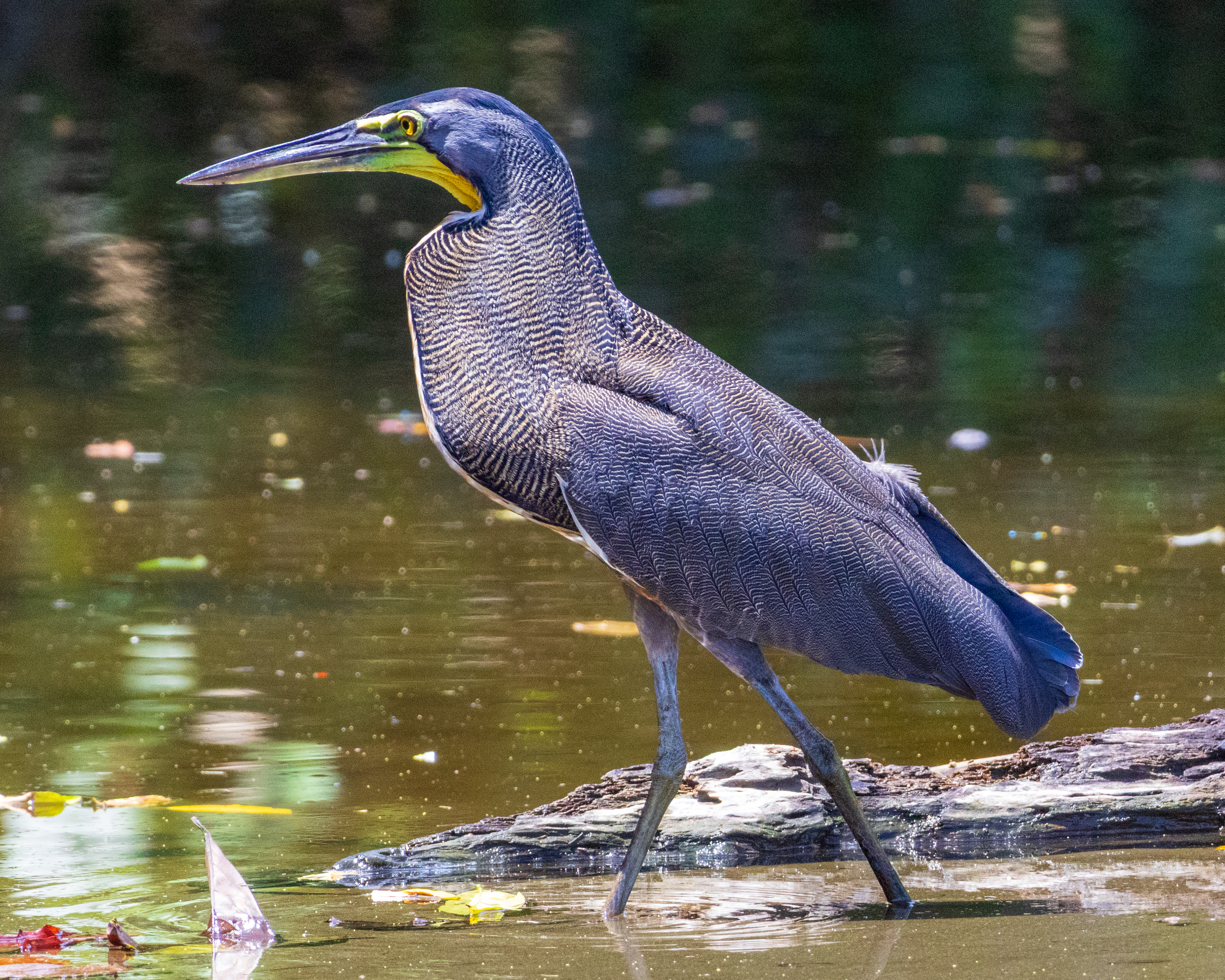
Adult

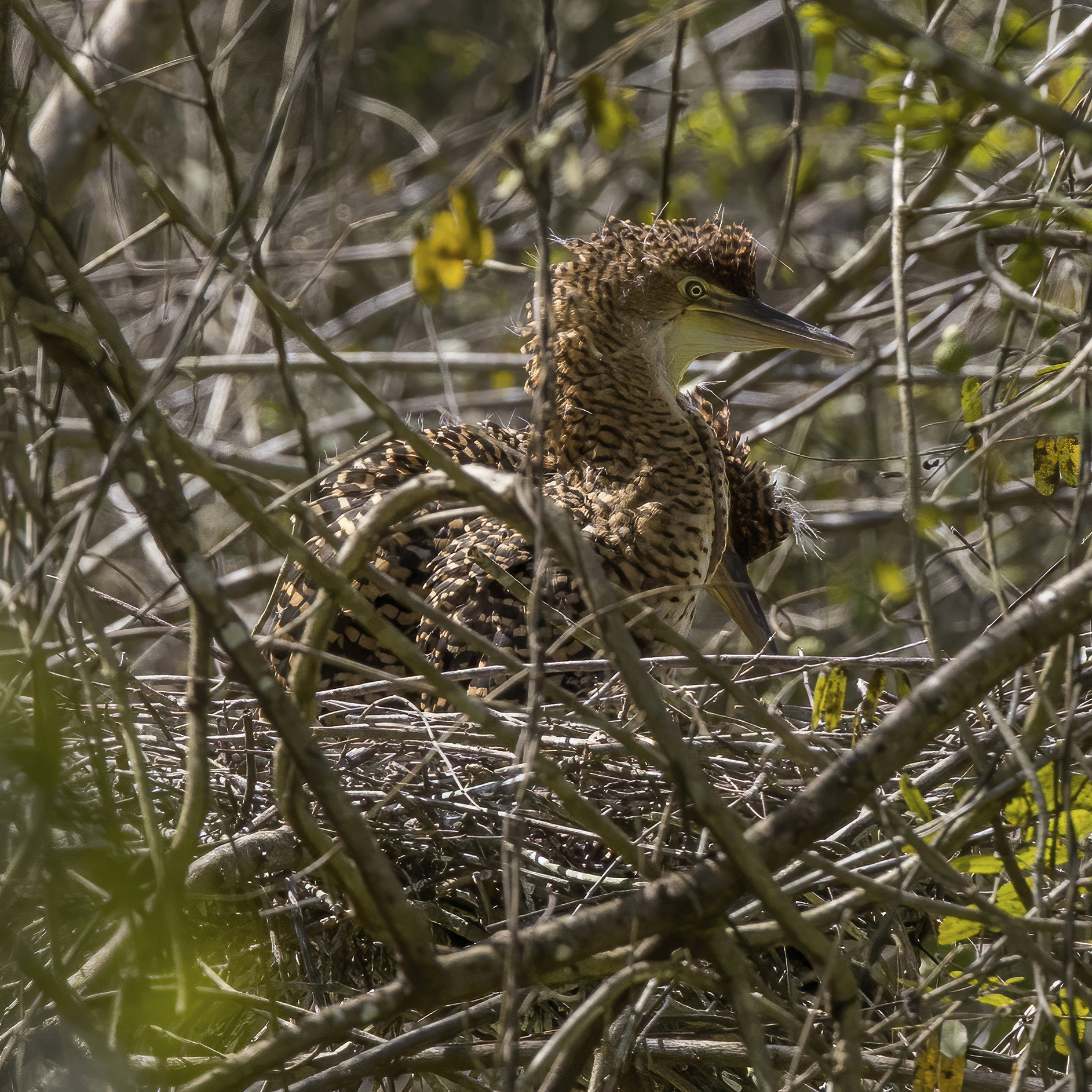
Juvenile on Nest

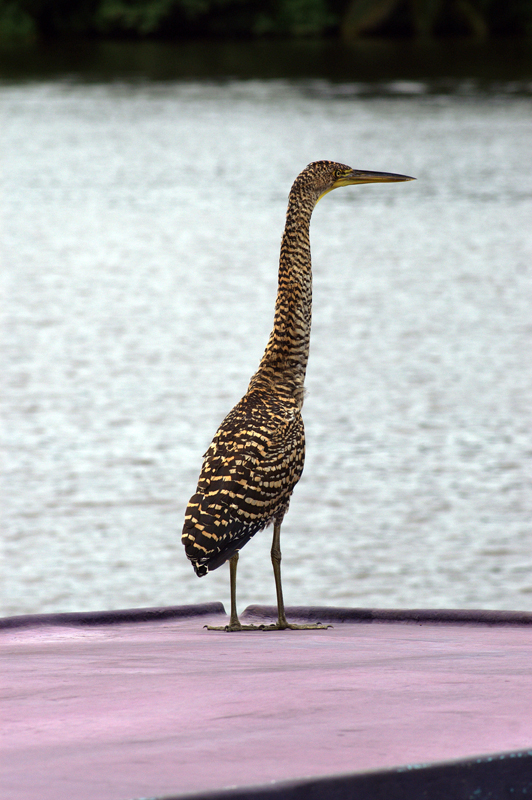
Juvenile
