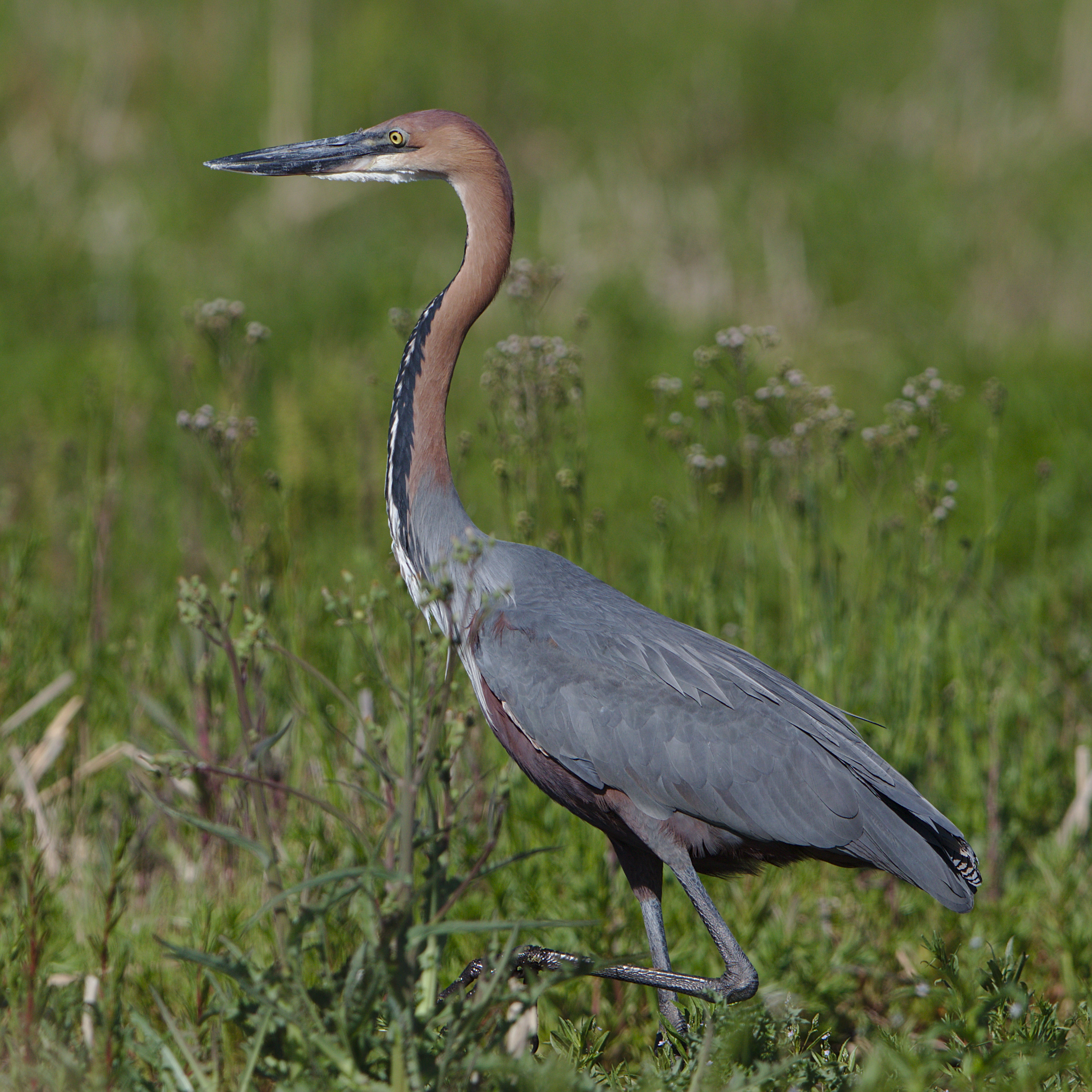
- Goliath heron at Marievale Bird Sanctuary, South Africa

Conservation status
- Least Concern (IUCN 3.1)

Scientific classification
- Kingdom: Animalia
- Phylum: Chordata
- Class: Aves
- Order: Pelecaniformes
- Family: Ardeidae
- Genus: Ardea
- Species: A. goliath

Binomial name
- Ardea goliath Cretzschmar, 1829

Synonyms
- Garza goliath

= Goliath heron =

Species of bird

The Goliath heron (Ardea goliath), also known as the giant heron, is a very large wading bird in the heron family, Ardeidae. It is primarily found in sub-Saharan Africa, with smaller, declining numbers in Southwest and South Asia. Asian records are now very rare, but it is still known as an occasional vagrant.

== Description ==
It is the world's largest living heron, though the extinct Bennu heron may have been larger. The height of the goliath heron is 120–152 cm (3 ft 11 in – 5 ft 0 in), the wingspan is 185–230 cm (6 ft 1 in – 7 ft 7 in), and the weight is 4–5 kg (8.8–11.0 lb). The tarsus measures from 21.2 to 25.5 cm (8.3 to 10.0 in) and the wing chord averages around 60.7 cm (23.9 in) in length. The culmen measures from 18 to 20 cm (7.1 to 7.9 in), while the bill from the gape measures around 24 cm (9.4 in). In flight it has a slow and rather ponderous look and, unlike some other herons, its legs are not held horizontally. Males and females look similar, with an overall covering of slate-grey and chestnut feathers. The head and its bushy crest, face, back, and sides of the neck are chestnut. The chin, throat, fore neck, and upper breast are white, with black streaks across the fore neck and upper breast. The lower breast and belly are buff with black streaks. The back and upper wings are slate-grey, with a chestnut shoulder patch at the bend of the wings when they are closed. The under wing is pale chestnut. The upper mandible is black and the lores and orbital areas are yellow with a greenish tinge. The eyes are yellow while the legs and feet are black. Juveniles look similar to adults, but are paler. The only heron with somewhat similarly coloured plumage, the widespread purple heron, is much smaller than the Goliath heron, and has a strongly striped neck pattern. Despite the shared plumage characteristics with the purple heron, the closest extant relatives of the Goliath heron are considered to be the great-billed and the white-bellied herons of Southern Asia. Due to their large size, this species trio is sometimes referred to as the "giant herons".

The Goliath heron has a distinct deep bark, often described as kowoork, audible from a distances of up to 2 km. A disturbance call (arrk), sharper and higher, can also occasionally be heard. A huh-huh is given during the crouched stage, while a krooo may be heard with the neck extended. Organ-like duetting has been reported at nest sites, but has not been confirmed.

== Habitat ==
The Goliath heron is very aquatic, even by heron standards, rarely venturing far from a water source and preferring to fly along waterways rather than move over land. Important habitats can include lakes, swamps, mangrove wetlands, reefs with cool water, sometimes river deltas. It typically is found in shallows, though can be observed near deep water over dense water vegetation. Goliath herons can even be found in small watering holes. They range in elevation from sea level to 2,100 m (6,900 ft). They tend to prefer pristine wetlands, and generally avoid areas where human disturbance is a regular occurrence.

== Diet and behaviour ==
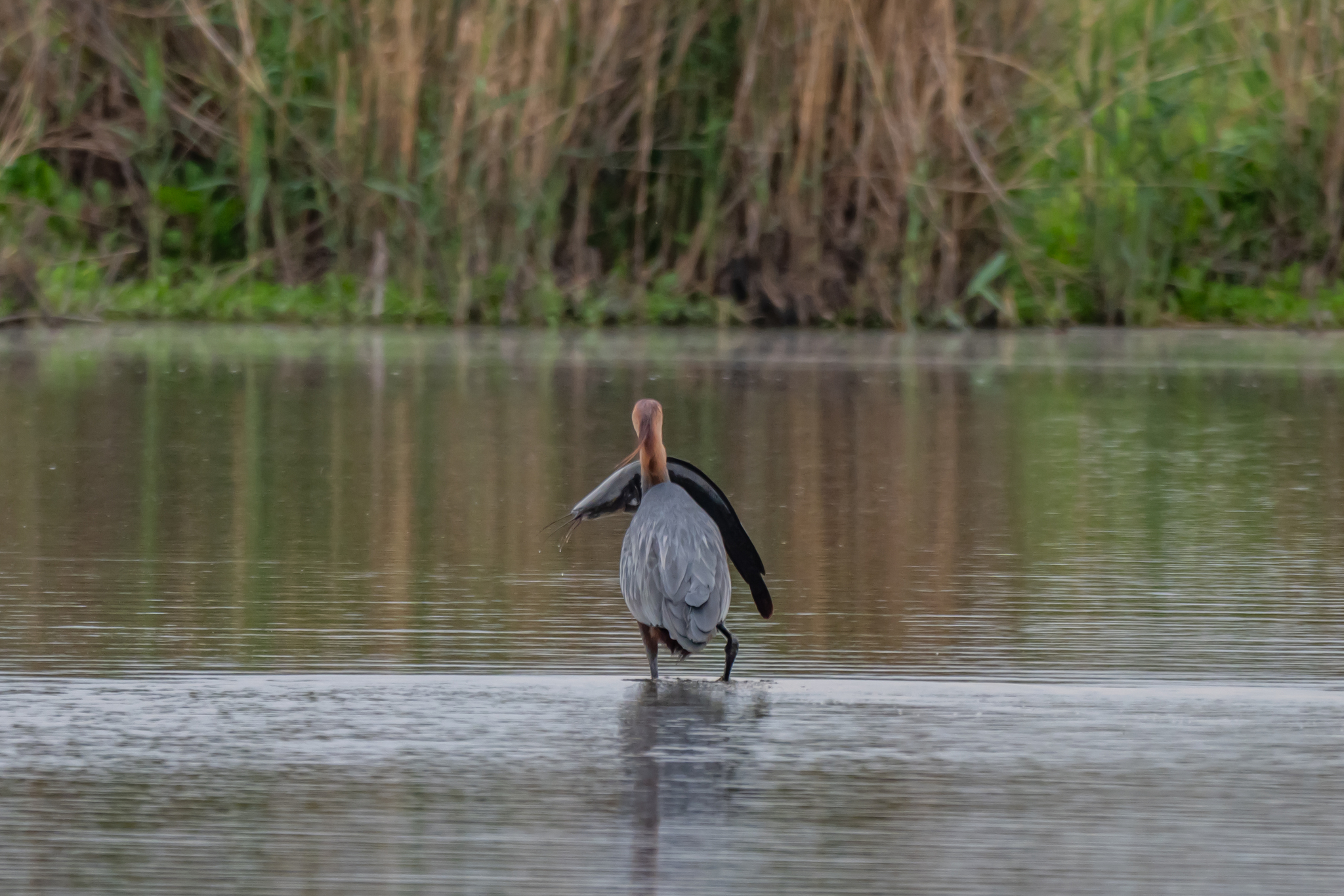
With an African sharptooth catfish, which was subsequently swallowed whole

Goliath herons are solitary foragers and are highly territorial towards other herons entering their feeding territories. On occasions, two may be seen together but these are most likely to be a breeding pair or immatures. A diurnal and often rather inactive feeder, this heron often hunts by standing in the shallows, intently watching the water at its feet. This is a typical feeding method among large Ardea herons and it can forage in deeper waters than most due to its larger size. It may also perch on heavy floating vegetation, to prevent water from rippling around them. As prey appears, the heron rapidly spears it with open mandibles, often spearing both mandibles through the fish's body, and then swallows it whole. It is possible that the bill is used in a lure-like fashion occasionally, attracting fish to the static, large object submerged in the water. The handling period is long, with herons often placing their struggling prey on floating vegetation while preparing to swallow it. Due to its generally slow movements and handling time, the goliath is frequently vulnerable to kleptoparasitism. In Africa, African fish eagles frequently pirate food caught by goliath herons, and other large birds such as saddle-billed storks and pelicans may also steal their prey.

The prey consists almost entirely of fish. The Goliath heron is a specialist in relatively large fish, with prey weight range of 50–980 g (0.11–2.16 lb), averaging 500–600 g (1.1–1.3 lb) and length of 30 cm (12 in). Fish exceeding 1 kg (2.2 lb) are usually rejected, though there is a report that the heron managed to swallow 1.4 kg (3.1 lb) fish. Small fish are generally ignored and the average Goliath heron catches around two or three fish a day. Breams, mullet, tilapia and carp have locally been recorded as preferred species. Any other small animals that they come across may be eaten, including frogs, prawns, small mammals, lizards, snakes, insects and even carrion.

== Breeding ==
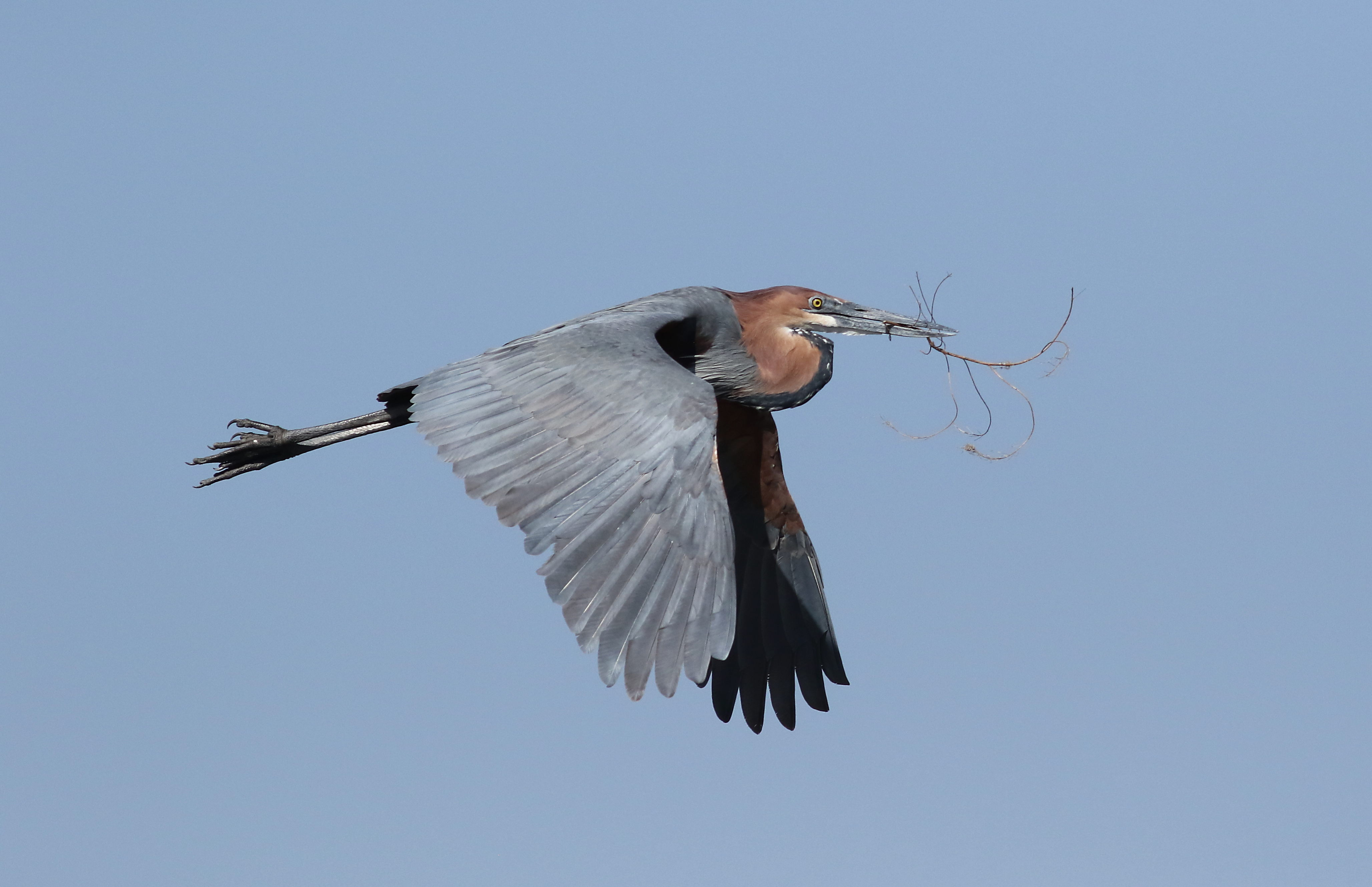
Adult transporting nesting material

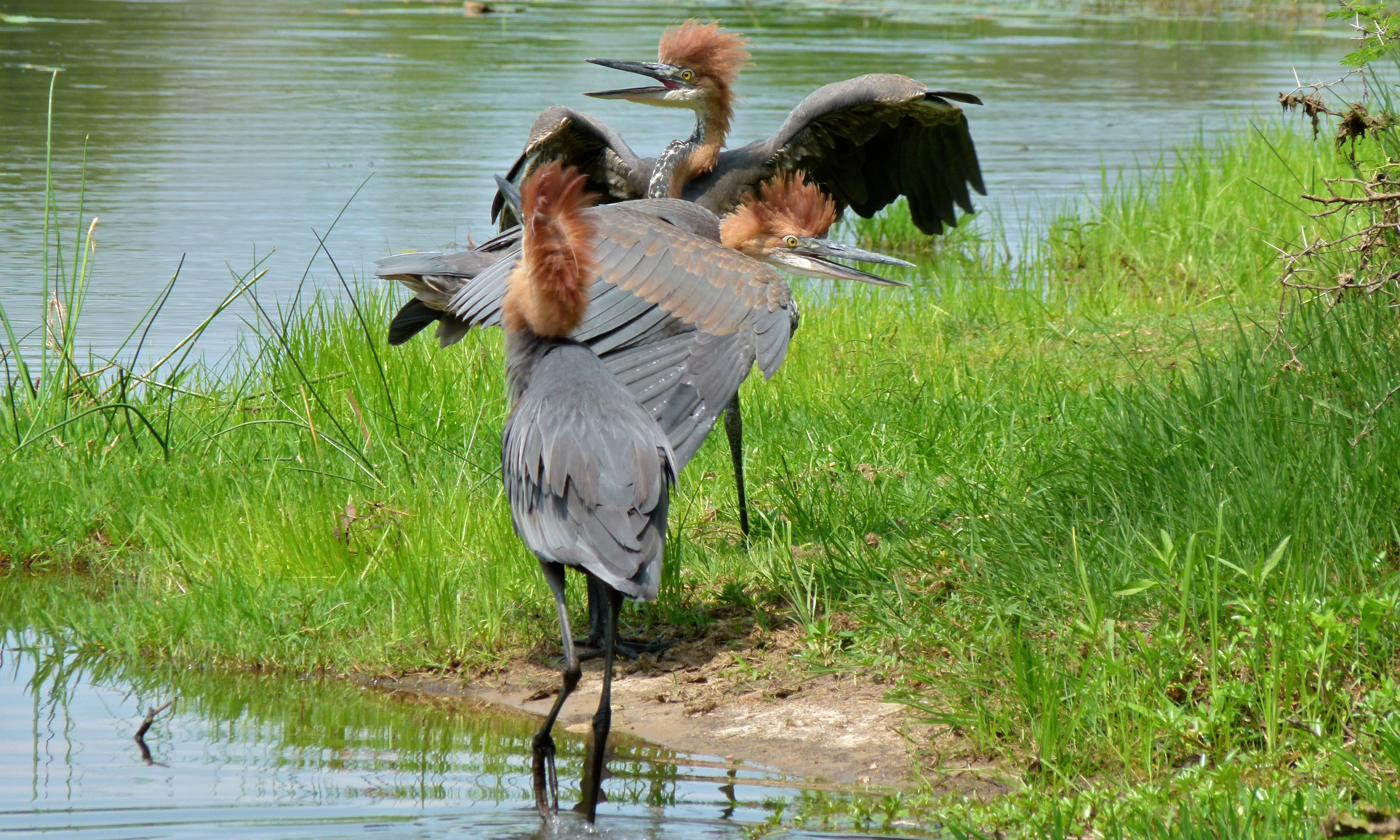
Fledglings in the Kruger National Park

Its breeding season coincides generally with the start of the rainy season, which is around November to March. In some areas, breeding is year around, with no discernable peak season. Breeding may not occur every year. Fairly adaptable in their nesting site selection, Goliath herons generally prefer to nest on islands or islands of vegetation. The birds may abandon a nesting site if the island becomes attached to the mainland. Lakes or other large bodies of water usually hold colonies. They nest fairly low in variously sedge, reeds, bushes, trees or even on rocks or large tree stumps. The nesting dispersal seems highly variable as everything from a solitary pair (with no other Goliath nests anywhere near) to fairly large colonies have been observed, with no seeming local geographical preferences. Occasionally, they may join mixed-species colonies including other heron species, cormorants, darters, ibises and gulls. The breeding displays are not well known and may be subdued, due in part to breeding pairs possibly reunited year after year. The nests are large but often flimsy (depending on available vegetation around the nesting site), often measuring around 1 to 1.5 m (3.3 to 4.9 ft) in diameter.

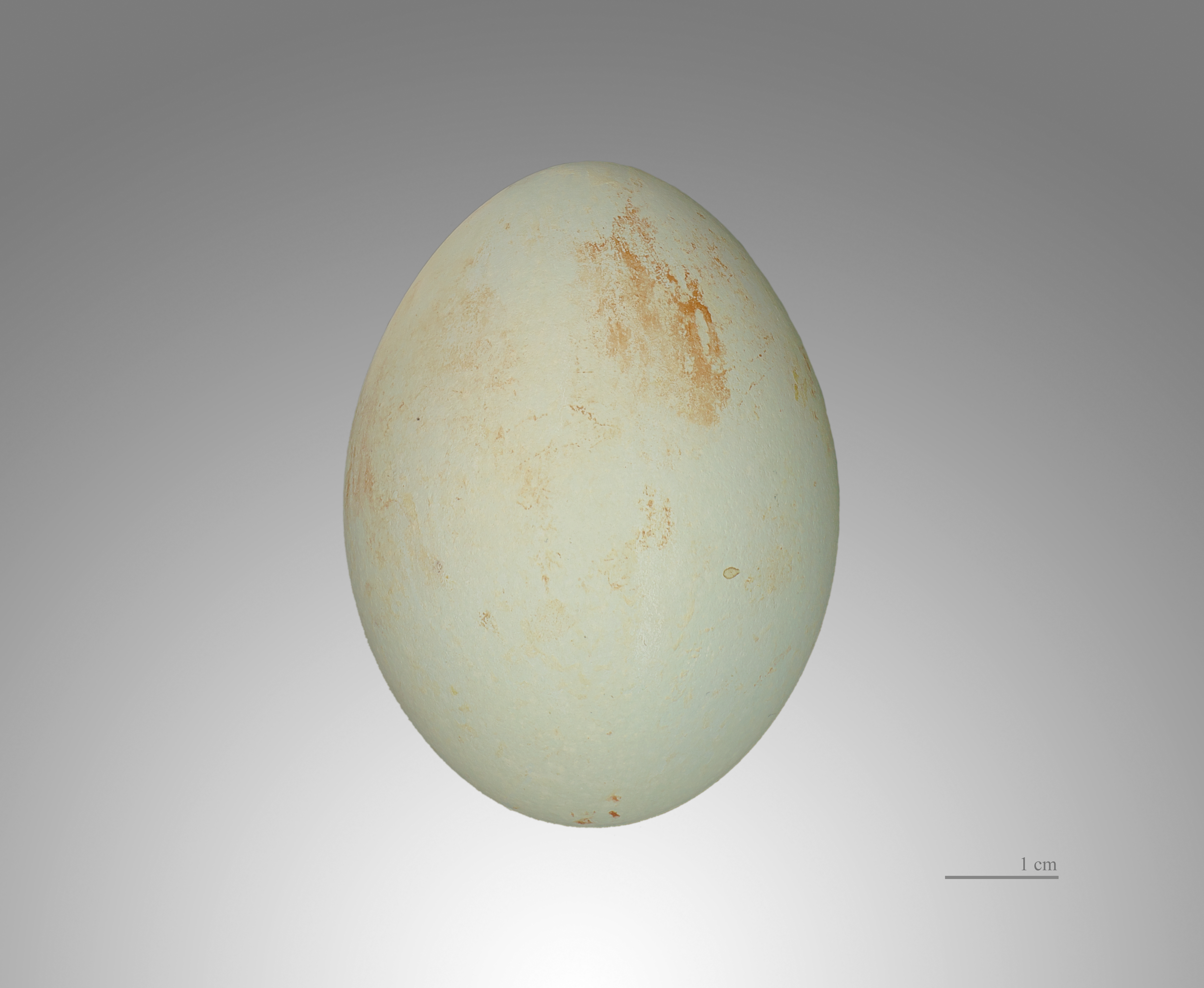
Ardea goliath egg

The eggs are pale blue, averaging 72 by 54 mm (2.8 by 2.1 in) and weighing around 108 g (3.8 oz). The clutch size can range from 2 to 5 (usually 3 or 4). Incubation lasts 24 to 30 days. Although they can sometimes replace clutches, often only around 25% of eggs succeed in hatching due to various environmental conditions or predation. The young are fed by regurgitation in the nest and, after a few weeks, can bill jab and practice defensive postures against each other. At around five weeks they leave the nest completely. The parents continue to tend to them for variously 40 to 80 days. Around 62% of fledglings who successfully leave the nest survive to adulthood. Locally, the white-tailed eagle and the African fish eagle may be a predator in colonies. Despite their ponderous movements, Goliath herons can think quickly and often take flight before danger approaches. Also, due to its size and formidable bill, the full-grown Goliath heron may not have any regular predators.

== Bibliography ==
- El-Naffar, M. K.; Khalifa, R. M.; Sakla, A. A. (1980). "Parasitofauna of the Egyptian aquatic birds. II. Trematode parasites of the giant heron (Ardea goliath) in Assiut governorate". Journal of the Egyptian Society of Parasitology. 10 (1): 107–116. ISSN 1110-0583.
- Hunter Jr., Malcolm L.; Calhoun, Aram; Wilcove, David S. (2004). "Goliath heron fishing with an artificial bait?". Waterbirds. 27 (3): 312–313. doi:10.1675/1524-4695(2004)027[0312:GHFWAA]2.0.CO;2. ISSN 1524-4695. S2CID 85948753.
