= Bennu heron =

Bennu heron Temporal range: Holocene, 0.00355 Ma
- Representation of the Bennu deity in Egyptian mythology, possibly based on the Bennu heron

Scientific classification
- Kingdom: Animalia
- Phylum: Chordata
- Class: Aves
- Order: Pelecaniformes
- Family: Ardeidae
- Genus: Ardea
- Species: †A. bennuides

Binomial name
- †Ardea bennuides Hoch, 1979

Extinct species of bird

The Bennu heron (Ardea bennuides) may have been an extinct large heron from what is now the United Arab Emirates at the eastern end of the Arabian Peninsula and perhaps also the wetlands around the Nile River in Egypt, though its identification as a separate species is based on a single partial bone.

== Background ==
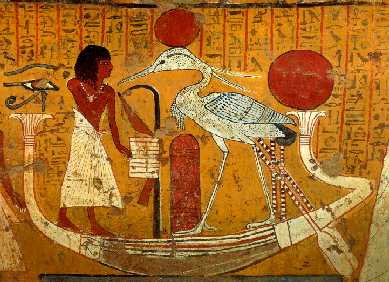
Standing as tall as the human depicted on an Ancient Egyptian papyrus, the Bennu deity may have been based on the Bennu heron.

Reported in 1979 by Ella Hoch, remains of the heron have been dated to 2700–1800 BCE, coinciding with the Umm al-Nar period. Known only from a partial tibiotarsus, the Bennu heron is tentatively suggested to be larger than the goliath heron, though Hoch also suggested that it could be just an enlarged grey heron. Hoch also claimed that it may have been the inspiration for the Bennu deity in Egyptian mythology, hence the specific name, in spite of the fact that the specimen was discovered from Arabia.

== Extinction ==
It has been speculated that the Bennu heron went extinct because of wetland degradation. Another likely cause of their extinction would be humans overhunting their population.
