= Cocoi heron =

- In Brazil

Conservation status
- Least Concern (IUCN 3.1)

Scientific classification
- Kingdom: Animalia
- Phylum: Chordata
- Class: Aves
- Order: Pelecaniformes
- Family: Ardeidae
- Genus: Ardea
- Species: A. cocoi

Binomial name
- Ardea cocoi Linnaeus, 1766
- Global range

Species of bird

The cocoi heron (Ardea cocoi) is a species of long-legged wading bird in the heron family Ardeidae found across South America. It has predominantly pale grey plumage with a darker grey crest. A carnivore, it hunts fish and crustaceans in shallow water.

== Taxonomy and evolution ==
The cocoi heron was originally described by Carl Linnaeus in his 1766 12th edition of Systema Naturae.

The cocoi heron forms a superspecies with the similar Afro-Eurasian grey heron and North and Central American great blue heron, with all of these species showing similar skeletal morphology.

=== Etymology ===
The origin of its species name is unknown, but may be related to the common name in Chile cuca, which in turn denotes the bird's call note. It is more widely known in South America as garza mora or "black heron".

== Distribution and habitat ==
The cocoi heron occurs throughout much of South America except in the Andes and in some parts of Argentina. It is native in Argentina, Panama, Suriname, Colombia, Venezuela, Bolivia, Brazil, Chile, Ecuador, French Guiana, Guyana, Paraguay, Peru and Uruguay. Overall, the cocoi heron is notably widespread and ranges from Central America to the mainland shores on the Strait of Magellan, but is rarely found further south than Chubut in Argentina. It has an estimated extent of occurrence of 20600000 km^{2}.

In Brazil

It inhabits the wetter parts of the Chaco and occurs as a vagrant in the Falkland Islands, Saint Helena, Ascension Island and Tristan da Cunha. It is a regular, non-breeding visitor to Trinidad and Tobago. The habitat comprises almost any body of water or wetland away from dense forest; including lake shores, swamps, rivers and estuaries. Gallery forest, grassland and beaches have also been reported to be suitable feeding grounds. Pastures appear to be disfavoured probably because these habitats harbour a large proportion of insects, which are less favoured as prey than fish and mammals. In the Falkland Islands, the habitat appears to comprise small streams. In one study in the Parana river, water with aquatic vegetation was found to be the most preferable, followed by open waters, with the lowest preference for beaches. This heron is found at elevations up to 2550 m above sea level.

== Description ==
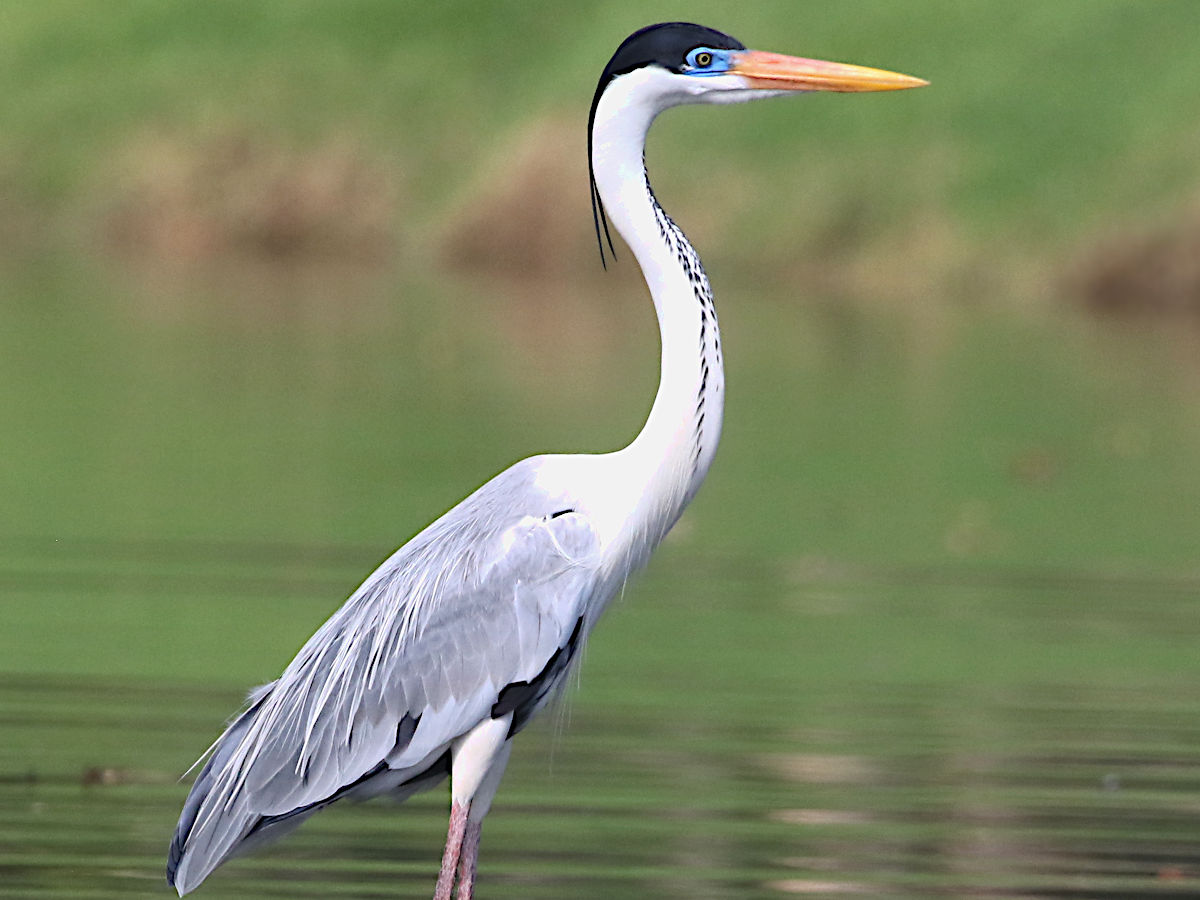
In Rio de Janeiro, Brazil

The cocoi heron is the largest of the South American heron species and measures 95–130 cm (37.5–51 in) in length, although body sizes vary regionally; with southern individuals probably being the largest. Adult weight of both males and females can variously range from 1.14 to 3.2 kg (2.5 to 7 lb). In the adult, wing length has been recorded as 421–455 mm (16.5–18 in), tail length 161–173 mm (6.5–7 in), culmen from base 128.5–148.7 mm (5–6 in) and tarsus 179–192 mm (7–7.5 in). Sizes are similar to its North American counterpart, the great blue heron, although the latter may average slightly larger.

Taking off from a tree, in Argentina
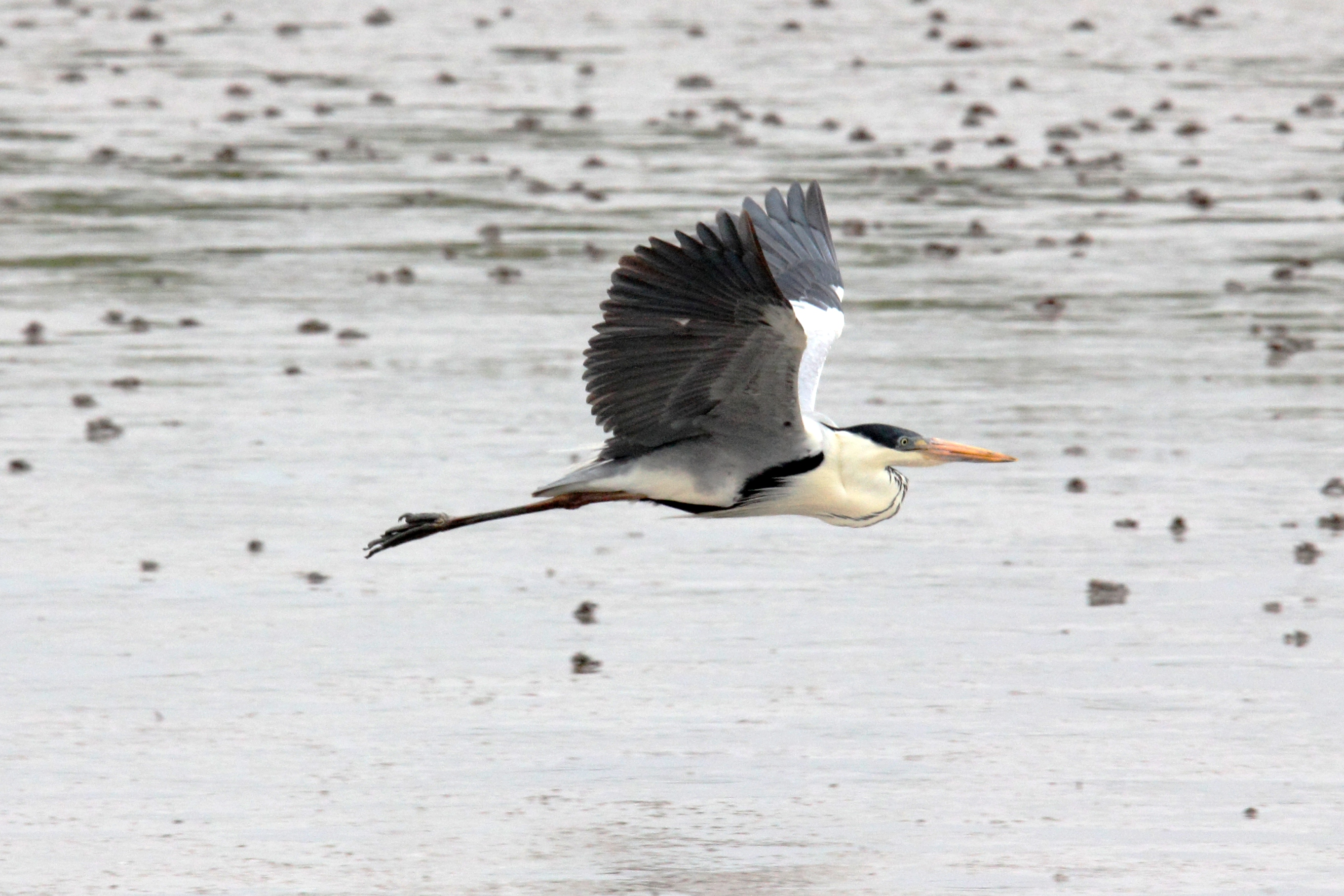
In flight, in Argentina

The sexes are alike in both body size and colouration. It has a grey back and upper wings and a white S-shaped neck, thighs, under-tail wing coverts and scapulars; with black streaks on the neck and upper breast. The forehead and crown of the head are black and this black extends down to the eye region and up to the pointed crest hanging down the nape. There is also black streaking on the neck and black patches on sides of the lower breast and abdomen. Leg colour has been reported as black, brownish-grey or dark green.

The iris is usually yellow and the bill dull yellow. The bare skin of the orbital region is pale greenish. Some breeding cocoi herons observed in Argentina have bright yellow bills with a red tinge at the base and dusky pink legs. In flight, its large wings make it a slow but sturdy and graceful flyer. The voice is a deep croak. Overall, the cocoi heron is similar in appearance to the grey heron; but the former has slightly darker colouration and a longer neck and crest.

In the juvenile, the underparts are ash grey and streaked with buff. The neck and upper body surface are pale brownish with a little ash grey tinge on the neck. Compared to the adult, the crown is duller and the under-tail coverts have a dusky streaking. Juveniles also lack the long plumes and occipital crest typical of the adult. Despite the paler colouration, the downy chick already shows the contrast between the dark head and pale neck typical of the adult.

=== Similar species ===
At the northernmost extent of its range (e.g., Colombia and Panama), the cocoi heron sometimes overlaps in range with the closely related and similarly sized great blue heron (A. herodias). The cocoi is distinguished by a striking white neck and solid black crown, but the duller juveniles are more easily confused.

== Ecology ==
=== Feeding ===
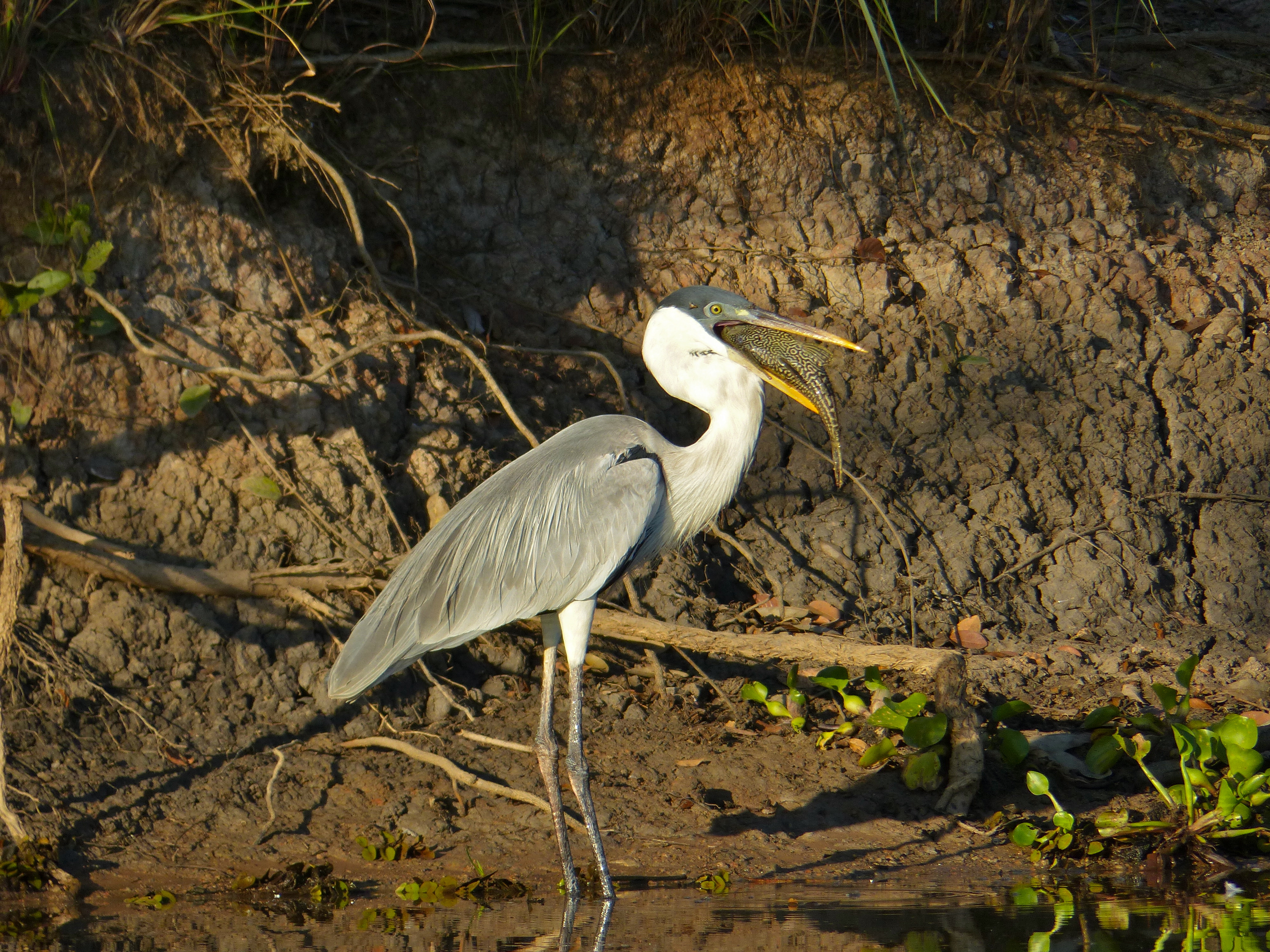
Swallowing a loricariid catfish, in Brazil

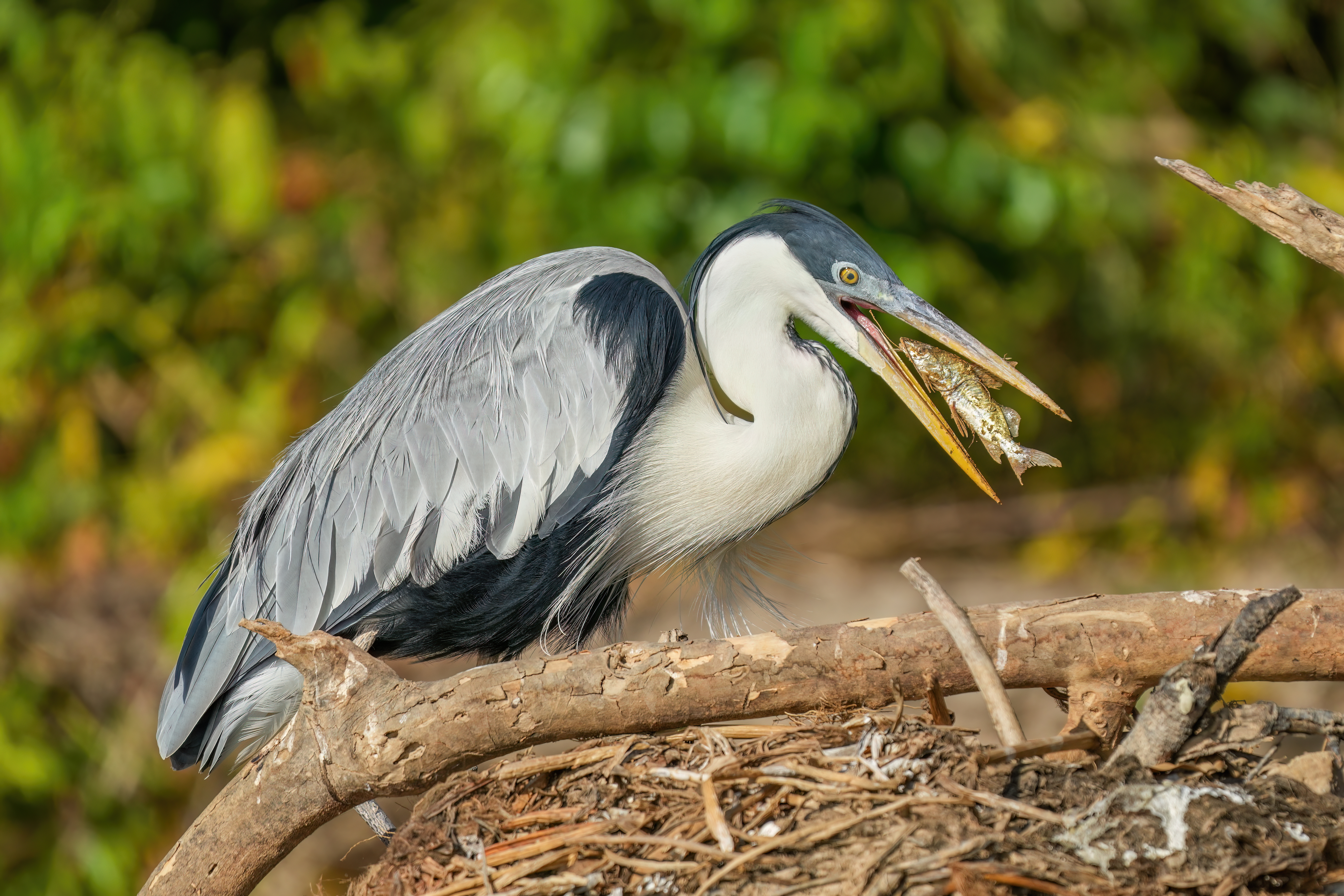
With a catfish, in Mato Grosso, Brazil

This heron feeds primarily on fish measuring over 20 cm (8 in) long; with mammals, amphibians and sometimes insects also being consumed. Fish species consumed include whitemouth croaker, wolf fish, various Leporinus species up to 200 mm long and streaked prochilod. This heron has also been observed to feed on carrion and Callinectes blue crabs. In Colombia, chicks have also been observed being fed predominantly fish and less frequently with amphibians and crustaceans.

The cocoi heron catches prey by striking its head into the water and thrusting its bill to stab downwards. It may also tilt its head downward above the water so that only its bill is immersed. During feeding, the head and neck move rapidly while the body remains immobile. Feeding is usually diurnal and solitary, especially in Argentina, although in Chile, it is considered to be a largely nocturnal feeder, with diurnal roosting taking place in trees overlooking the water. In Venezuela, it has also been seen foraging in large groups. Where feeding is diurnal, there appears to be a peak in feeding activity at noon and a reduction at dusk.

The cocoi heron appears able to use alternative food sources by exploring foraging sites distant from its breeding colonies, since terrestrial rodents and reptiles and marine organisms have been found in the diet of individuals from freshwater colonies. Some colonies also reside near to estuarine coastland and individuals from these colonies are more reliant on marine prey. Foraging individuals often stay near to colonies and colony site choice has been found to be strongly linked to proximity to high-quality foraging habitats. The heron may also sometimes exploit dead whitemouth croaker discarded by recreational fisheries.

=== Breeding ===
Generation length in years has been estimated as 10.5 years, with a maximum longevity of 24.4 years. This heron is primarily non-migratory, but may move toward the equator during winter to seek warmer temperatures.

The onset of the nesting season varies geographically. In Suriname, it begins in July; whereas it begins in August to November in Brazil and Argentina, October in Uruguay and November in the Buenos Aires region. The cocoi heron nests colonially in trees. The large, deep nest is constructed from branches and sticks with grass, usually situated in trees. Near Buenos Aires, nests consisted of branches of Solanum glauca and dry thistles. They were roughly circular, 65 cm in diameter and very deep. In Chile, cocoi herons have been observed to construct their nests on weeping willow trees in standing water with rushes.

The eggs are pale blue with paler speckles and some whitish traces. Egg dimensions from various clutches in South America lie in the range 62-69 x 45–48 mm. Eggs from one Argentinian clutch weighed 70-80 g. From one colony in Buenos Aires, incubation was estimated as 24–26 days. However, in one Chilean colony where eggs hatched in September (spring), incubation period was estimated as 27 days, ranging 26–29 days. Clutch size is 1 to 4 eggs. Juveniles may remain in the nest for up to 12 to 13 weeks, but most leave at 6 to 7 weeks.

=== Threats ===
Alongside human inference, one natural threat may be posed by crested caracara. In a colony in Buenos Aires, the young in a caracara nest hatched before that of the cocoi heron in a nearby nest. The former were reared largely on the heron chicks.

In southeastern Peru, cocoi herons are potential prey for green anacondas.

== Conservation ==
The cocoi heron is classified by the IUCN as least concern because of its extensive geographical range, apparently stable population trend and large population size. Individuals in some territories are affected by agrochemicals, environmental modification and human interference with nests and eggs, but these issues do not constitute severely harmful threats and do not threaten the species with extinction.
