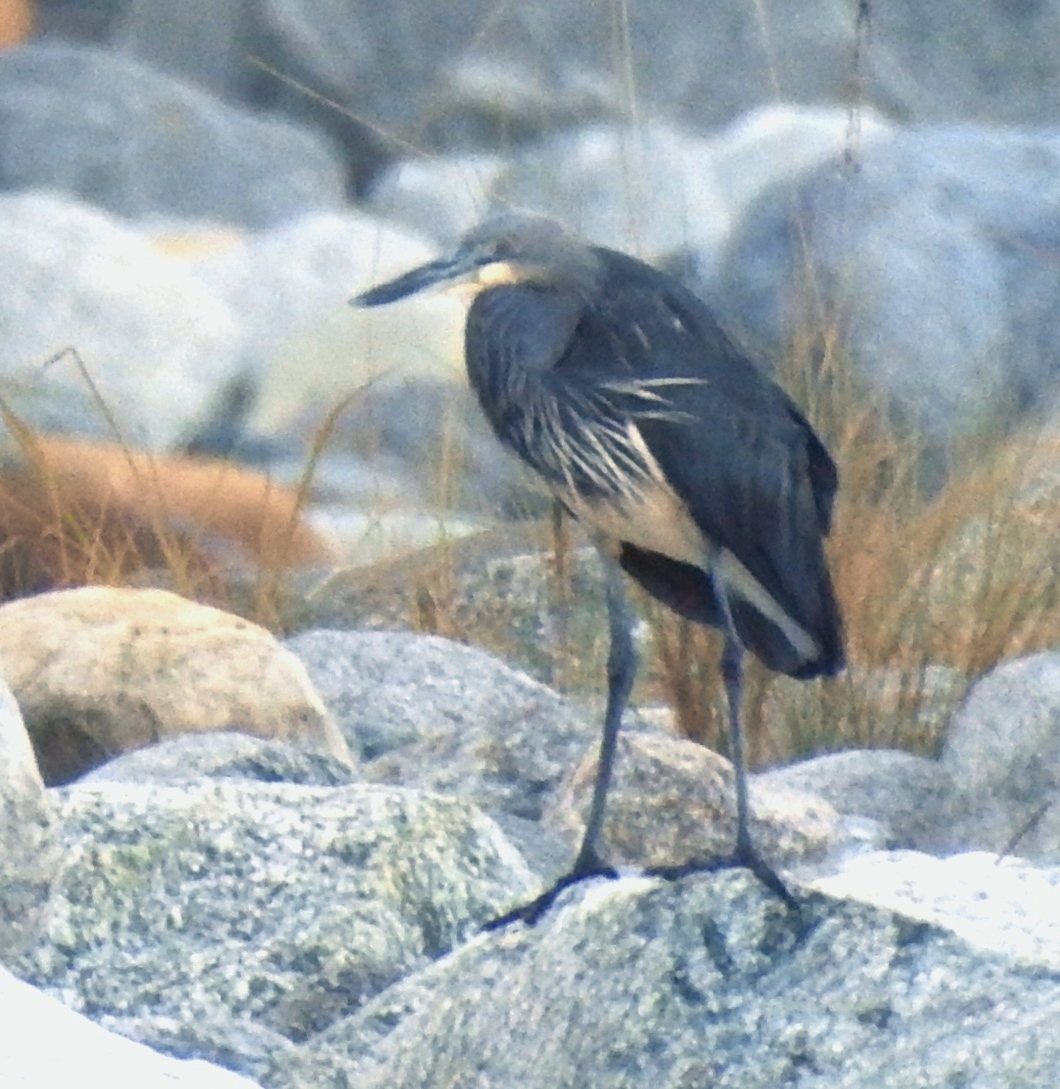
- At Namdapha National Park

Conservation status
- Critically Endangered (IUCN 3.1)

Scientific classification
- Kingdom: Animalia
- Phylum: Chordata
- Class: Aves
- Order: Pelecaniformes
- Family: Ardeidae
- Genus: Ardea
- Species: A. insignis

Binomial name
- Ardea insignis Hume, 1878

Synonyms
- Ardea imperialis

= White-bellied heron =

Species of bird

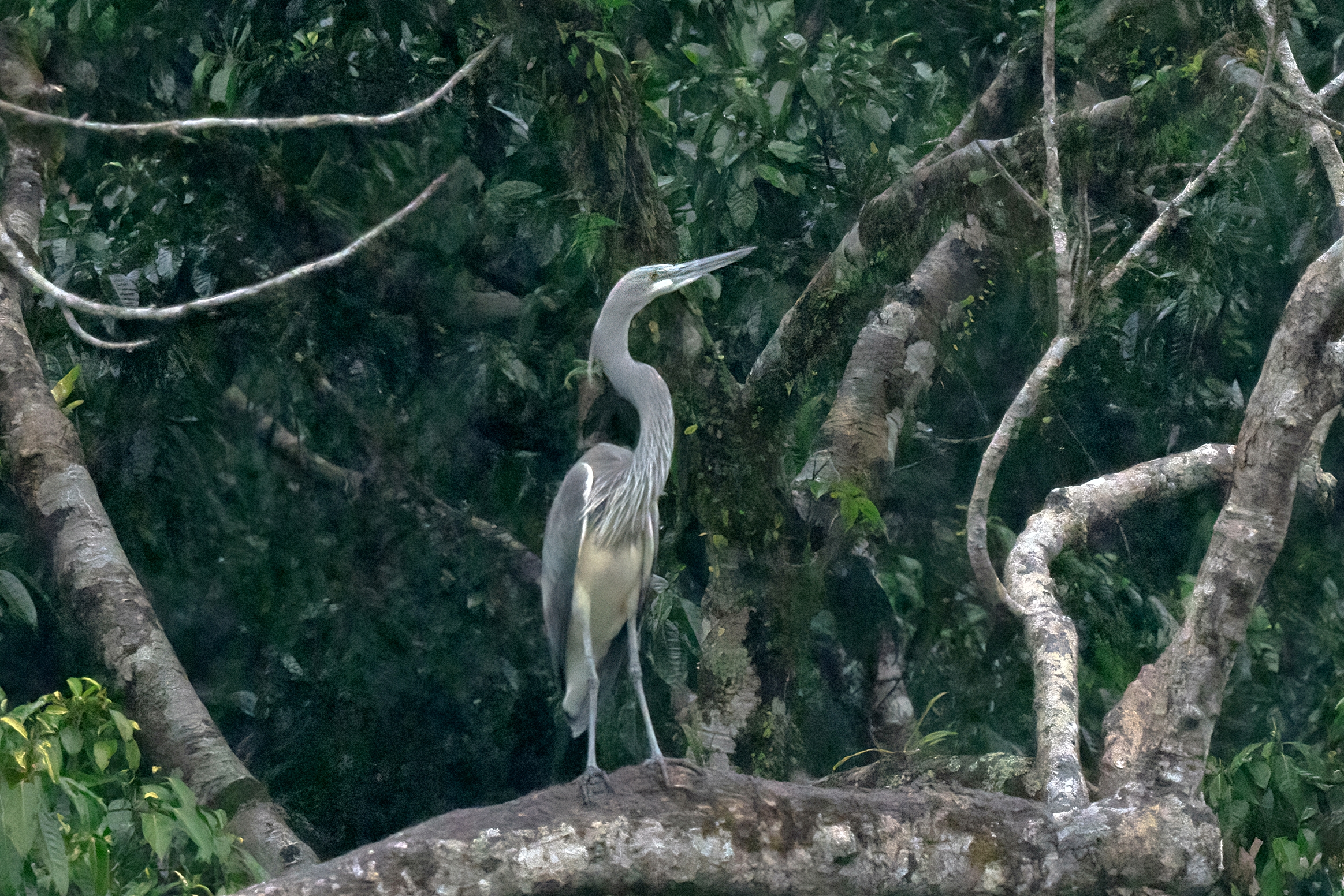
White-bellied Heron at Namdapha NP, Changlang, Arunachal Pradesh, India

The white-bellied heron (Ardea insignis) also known as the imperial heron or great white-bellied heron, is a large heron species living in the foothills of the eastern Himalayas in northeast India and Bhutan to northern Myanmar. It inhabits undisturbed rivers and wetlands. It has been listed as Critically Endangered on the IUCN Red List since 2007, because the global population is estimated at fewer than 250 mature individuals and threatened by habitat loss and human disturbance. It is mostly dark grey with a white throat and underparts.

== Taxonomy ==
The scientific name Ardea insignis was suggested by Brian Houghton Hodgson in 1844; he had presented a zoological specimen to the British Museum but a description was not published. This name was therefore considered a nomen nudum. In 1878, Allan Octavian Hume described the differences between the white-bellied and the great-billed heron (Ardea sumatrana) while using the binomial name suggested by Hodgson. E. C. Stuart Baker gave the name Ardea imperialis in 1929 to replace Hodgson's nomen nudum. It was used until 1963, when Biswamoy Biswas commented on Sidney Dillon Ripley's synoptic list and noted that Ardea insignis Hume had priority, and its treatment as a synonym of Ardea nobilis Blyth and Ardea sumatrana Raffles was based on misidentification.

== Description ==
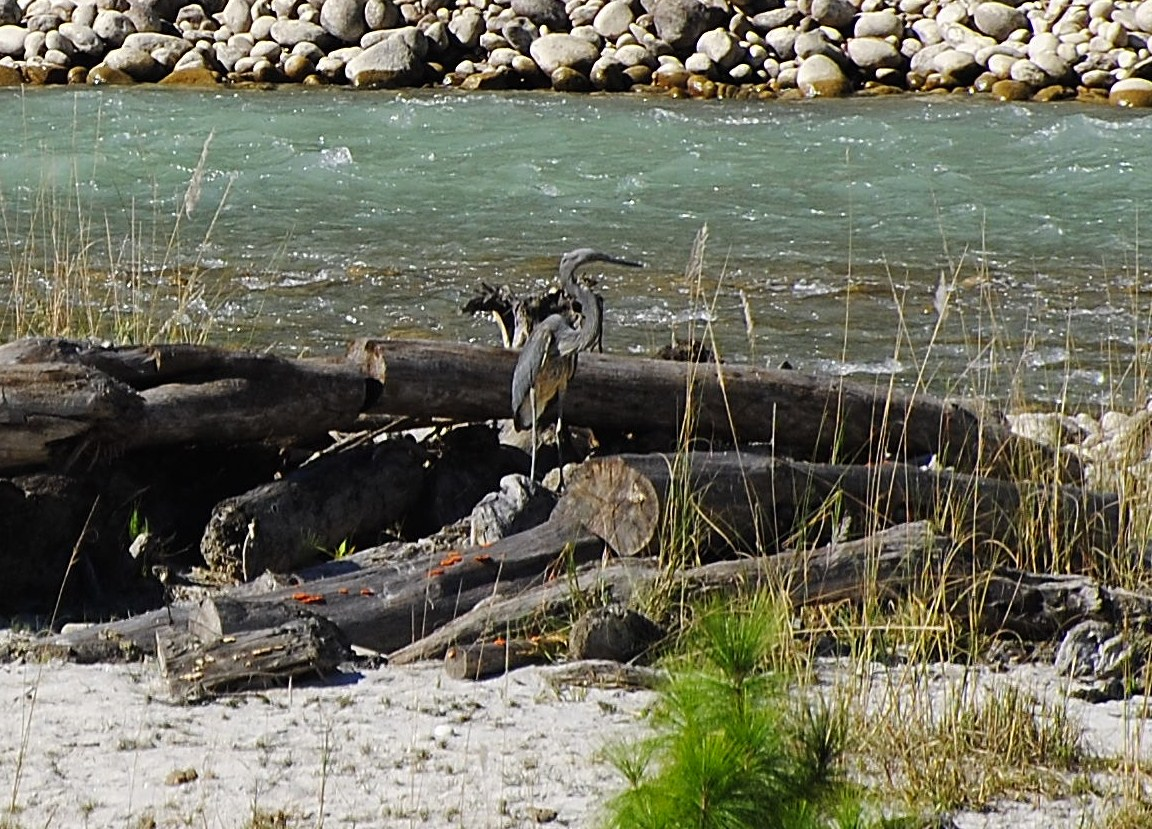
Perched beside the Pho Chhu in Bhutan

The white-bellied heron has a uniform dark grey plumage, a whitish belly, and long silvery or whitish plumes on the rear crown and lower foreneck. In breeding plumage, it has a greyish-white nape plume and elongated grey breast feathers with white centers. The face is greenish grey and the 15.2–17.6 cm (6.0–6.9 in) long bill black, but greenish near the base and tip; the iris is yellow to ochre, and the legs and feet are dull grey. Juveniles are browner above and have a paler bill and paler legs. In flight, it has a uniform dark grey upperwing and white underwing covert feathers contrasting with dark grey flight feathers. The rump appears pale grey.

With a height of 127 cm (50 in), it is the second largest heron. A white-bellied heron killed on the upper Ayeyarwady River in 1903 had 61 cm (24 in) long wing bones, a wing spread of 100 cm (40 in) and a wingspan of 210 cm (84 in). Its mean weight is estimated at 3.2–3.4 kg (7.1–7.5 lb).

== Distribution and habitat ==
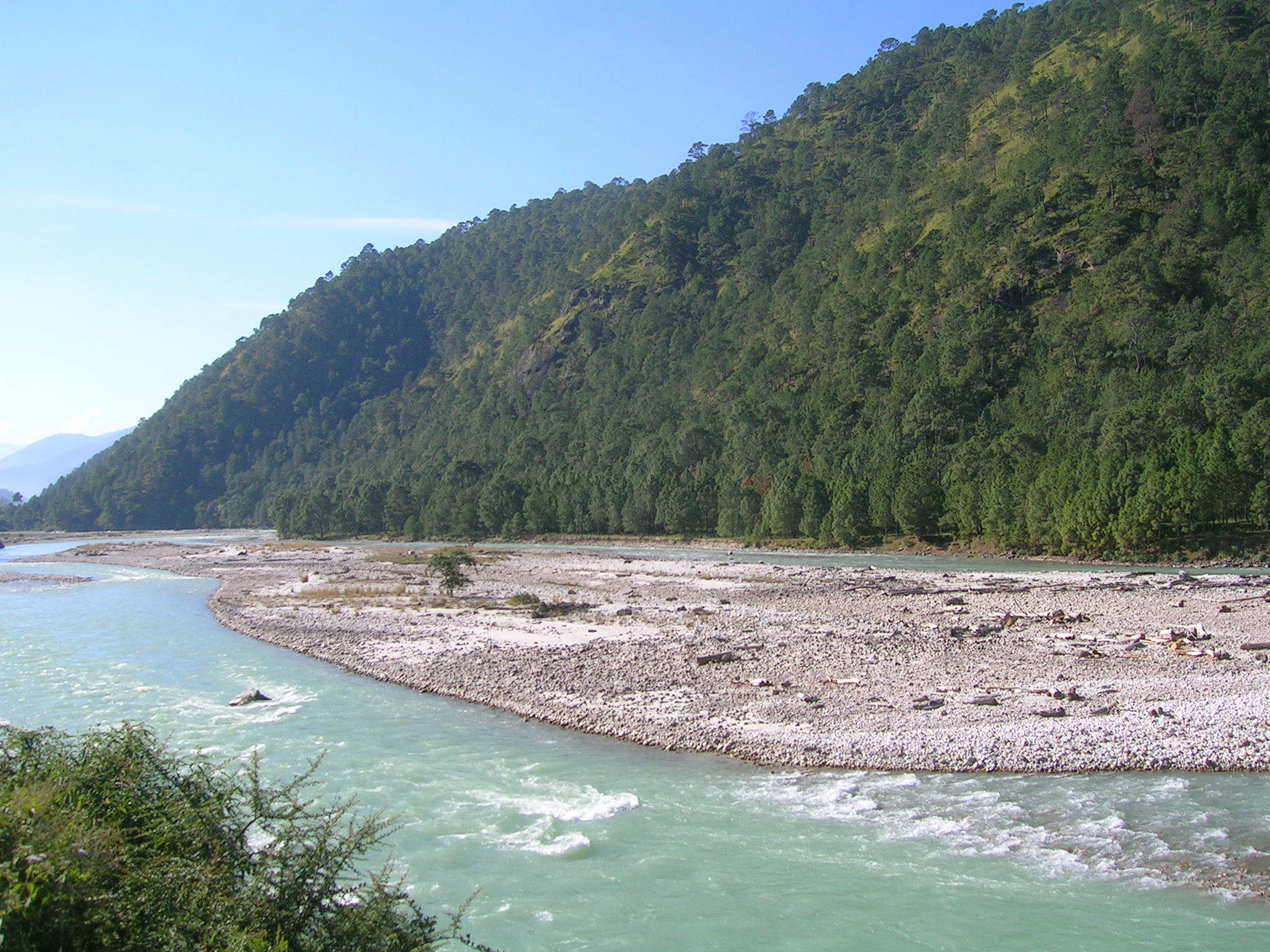
Riverine habitat in Bhutan

The white-bellied heron inhabits the wetlands of tropical and subtropical forests in the foothills of the eastern Himalayas of northeast India and Myanmar. It also occurs in Bhutan's low elevation riparian environments below 1,700 m (5,600 ft).

In Bhutan, it inhabits the basin of Sankosh River and its tributaries below 1,500 m (4,900 ft). It was observed breeding in the Sankosh and Mangdechhu river basins; nests were found in chir pine (Pinus roxburghii), champak (Magnolia champaca) and bayur trees (Pterospermum acerifolium) at elevations of 400–1,430 m (1,310–4,690 ft). In Assam, it was sighted several times in Kaziranga National Park during the winter seasons of 1994 and 1995. In Pobitora Wildlife Sanctuary, it was sighted regularly between 1996 and 2001. In Arunachal Pradesh, repeated sightings along Namdapha and Noa Dihing Rivers indicate that Namdapha National Park is an important refuge and breeding site. In northern Myanmar, it was observed along four streams in the Hkakabo Razi landscape between March 2016 and December 2020.

== Behaviour and ecology ==
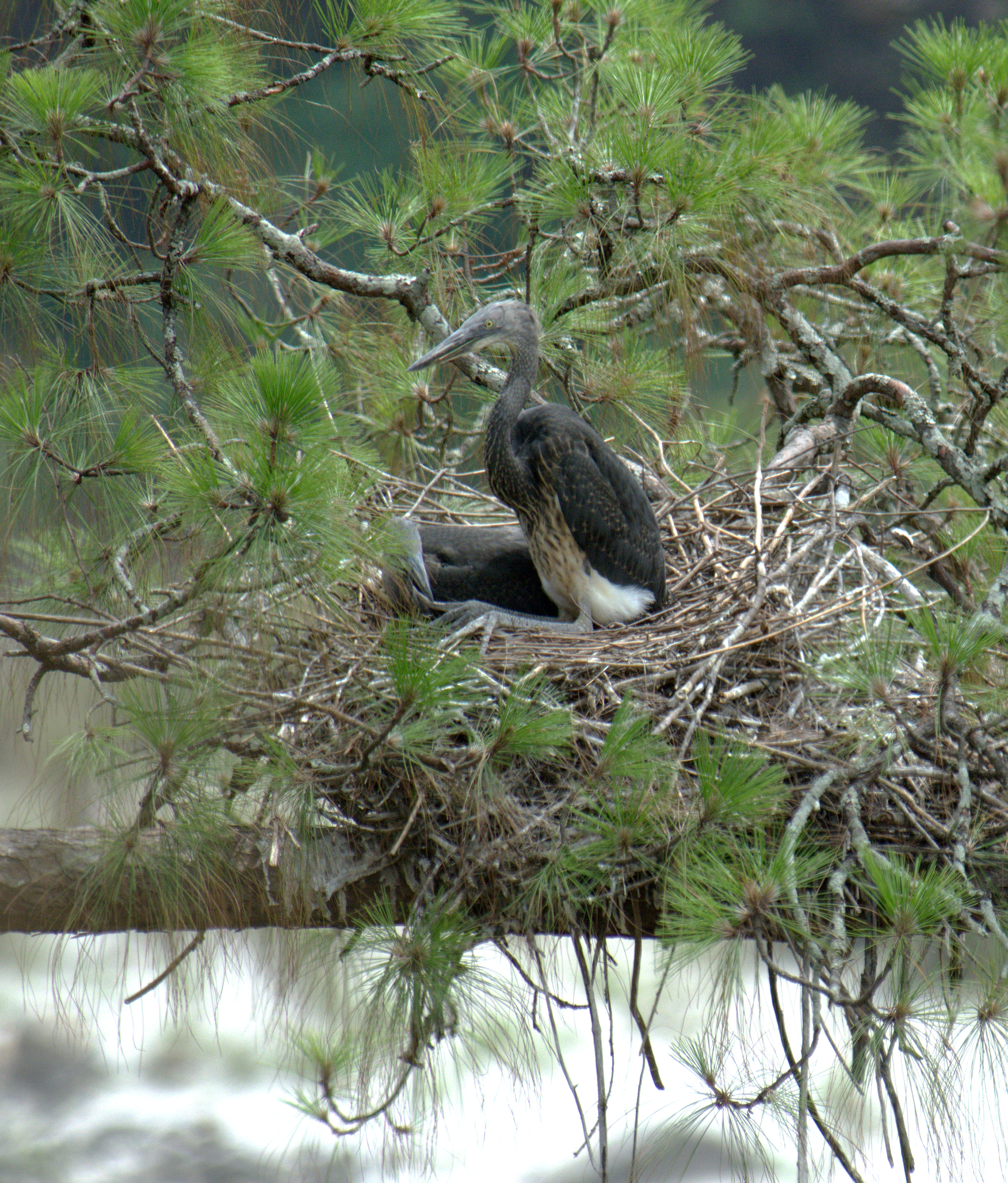
Two chicks on a nest in Bhutan

When disturbed, the white-bellied heron calls with a deep croak, "ock ock ock ock urrrrrr". During the breeding season, the white-bellied heron calls during early morning hours, with the highest call density shortly before sunrise; it also frequently calls in late night hours, but rarely during the day.

During the day, it roosts for long periods of up to six hours on bare sandy patches, large rocks, logs and trees, and sometimes lies down on its sternum. In the night, it sleeps with the head pressed on the breast and one leg grasping on the perch, while the other is tucked up in the belly. Adult white-bellied herons roost alone, and juveniles roost in pairs.

It prefers foraging in shallow river sections with multiple about 200 m (660 ft) wide channels, in shallow ponds and pools within river islands, and on island edges. It feeds mostly on Schizothorax carps all year through, but also on brown trout (Salmo trutta) in spring and Garra fish species during the summer. Feeding bouts last for 5 to 58 minutes.

== Threats ==
The white-bellied heron is threatened by habitat loss, increasing disturbance and habitat degradation due to conversion of wetlands for agriculture and expansion of settlements, harvesting of wetland resources and poaching. It is locally extinct in Nepal and possibly also in Bangladesh. In Bhutan, four large hydropower projects are located in important white-bellied heron habitat, and rivers are exploited for gravel and sand mining. Nesting sites have been negatively affected by forest fires.

== Conservation ==
In India, the white-bellied heron is protected under Schedule 1 of the Wild Life (Protection) Act, 1972. In Myanmar, it is afforded the highest level of legal protection since 1994. It has been listed as Critically Endangered on the IUCN Red List since 2007 as the global population is thought to consist of fewer than 250 mature individuals and to decline rapidly.

A white-bellied heron was hatched in captivity for the first time in May 2011 and released in September 2011 in Bhutan's Punakha District.
