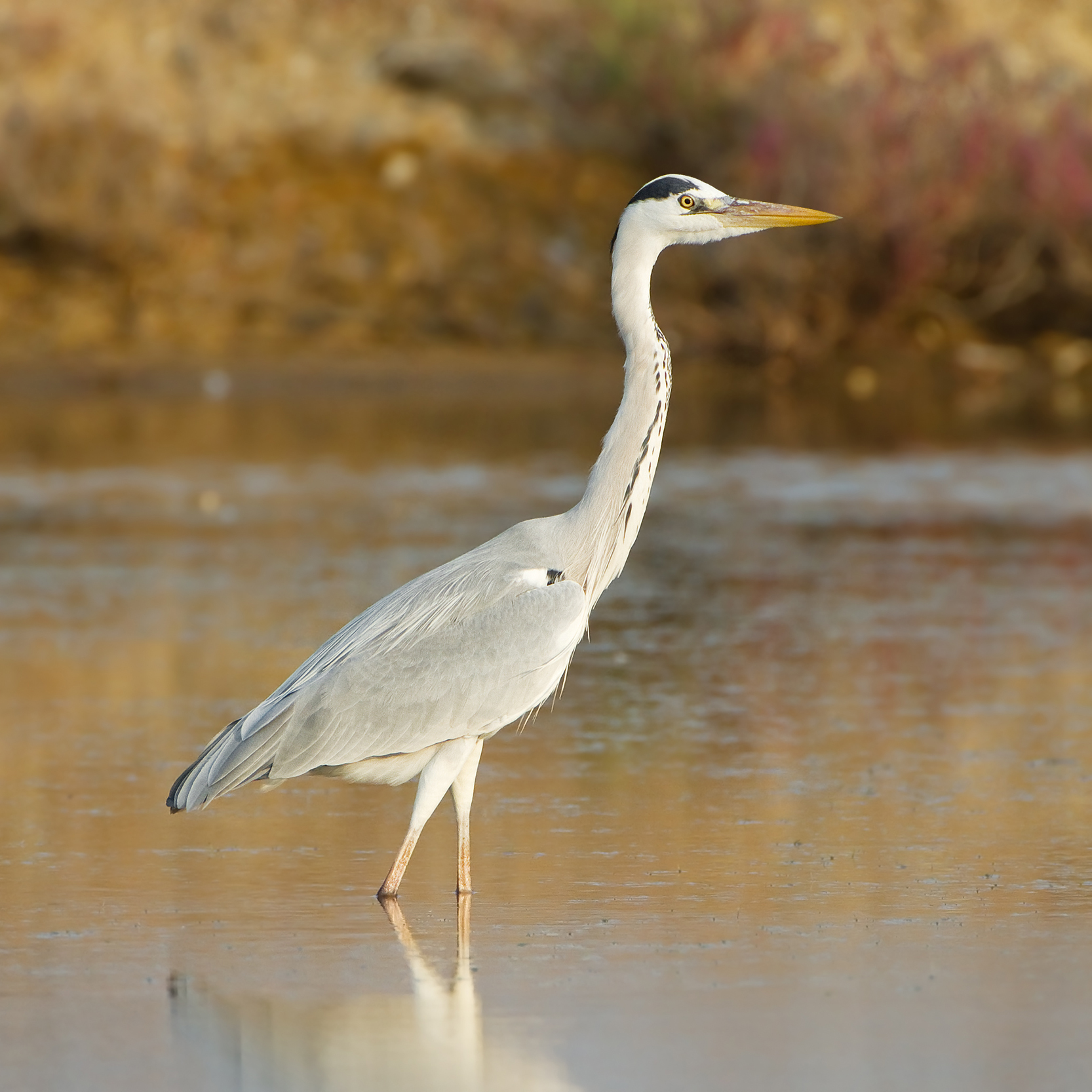
- Grey heron (A. cinerea)

Scientific classification
- Kingdom: Animalia
- Phylum: Chordata
- Class: Aves
- Order: Pelecaniformes
- Family: Ardeidae
- Subfamily: Ardeinae
- Genus: Ardea; Linnaeus, 1758

Type species
- Ardea cinerea Linnaeus, 1758

Species
- 12, see text

Synonyms
- Bubulcus Bonaparte, 1855; Casmerodius Gloger, 1842; Herodias F. Boie 1822; Mesophoyx Sharpe, 1894; Myola Mathews, 1913; Tonophoyx Mathews, 1913

= Ardea (bird) =

Ardea Temporal range: Middle Miocene to present

Genus of birds

Ardea is a genus of herons. These herons are generally large in size, typically 80–100 cm or more in length.

These large herons are associated with wetlands where they prey on fish, frogs, and other aquatic species. Most members of this almost worldwide group breed colonially in trees, building large stick nests.

Northern species such as great blue, grey, and purple herons may migrate south in winter, although the first two do so only from areas where the waters freeze.

== Description ==
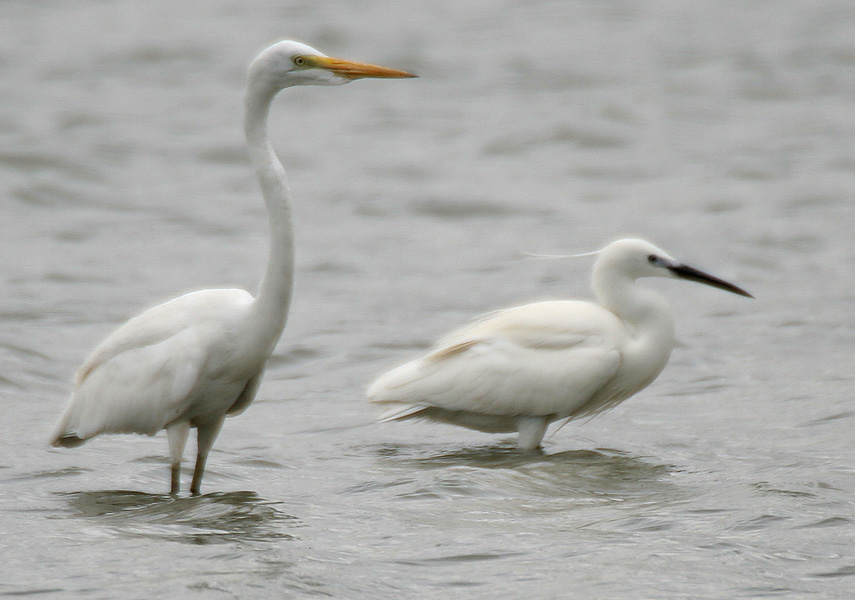
The great egret (Ardea alba, left) resembles the other Ardea in habitus, and the little egret (Egretta garzetta, right) only in color.

These are powerful birds with large spear-like bills, long necks and long legs, which hunt by waiting motionless or stalking their prey in shallow water before seizing it with a sudden lunge. They have a slow steady flight, with the neck retracted as is characteristic of herons and bitterns; this distinguishes them from storks, cranes, flamingos, and spoonbills, which extend their necks.

== Taxonomy ==
The genus Ardea was introduced in 1758 by the Swedish naturalist Carl Linnaeus in 1758 in the tenth edition of his Systema Naturae. The genus name comes from the Latin word ardea meaning "heron". The type species was designated as the grey heron (Ardea cinerea) by George Robert Gray in 1840.

Some members of Ardea are clearly very closely related, such as the grey, great blue, and cocoi herons, which form a superspecies. However, the great egret, in particular, has been placed in other genera by various authors as Egretta alba and Casmerodius albus. Nevertheless, this species closely resembles the large Ardea herons in everything but color, whereas it shows fewer similarities to the smaller white egrets.

== Species ==
The genus contains 16 species:

Image	Scientific name	Common name	Distribution
	Ardea pacifica	White-necked heron or Pacific heron	Australia.
	Ardea alba	Great egret, great white heron or white egret	Most of Asia south from Russia; sub-Saharan Africa and the Mediterranean; North, Central and South America; the Caribbean islands.
	Ardea brachyrhyncha	Yellow-billed egret	Sub-Saharan Africa
	Ardea intermedia	Medium egret	Southeast Asia, Indochina.
	Ardea plumifera	Plumed egret	Australia and eastern Indonesia
	Ardea ibis	Western cattle egret	Southern Europe to Iran, Africa, Indian Ocean Islands, North to South America
	Ardea coromanda	Eastern cattle egret	South and Southeast Asia, Australasia
	Ardea cinerea	Grey heron	Norway, Sweden, and most Northern European countries; Asia, east from Myanmar, the Indian subcontinent, Iran, Iraq, the Ural and Caucasus regions; Green Spain, Mediterranean islands, south of France, Italy, the Balkans, the Adriatic; Sub-Saharan Africa, the Canary Islands, coastal Morocco, Algeria, Tunisia, Libya, Egypt.
	Ardea herodias	Great blue heron	North America, as far north as Alaska and the southern Canadian provinces in summer; winter migrating is along waterways of the southernmost mainland United States, the coastal Gulf states, from Florida west to the California coast; most states of México, all of Central America; most Caribbean islands; northern South America (north of Argentina).
	Ardea cocoi	Cocoi heron	South America.
	Ardea purpurea	Purple heron	Africa; central and southern Europe; South and East Asia.
	Ardea humbloti	Humblot's heron	Madagascar.
	Ardea insignis	White-bellied heron	Eastern Himalayas of India and Myanmar.
	Ardea sumatrana	Great-billed heron	South Asia, Indochina; Australasia, Indonesia, the Philippines.
	Ardea melanocephala	Black-headed heron	Sub-Saharan Africa and Madagascar.
	Ardea goliath	Goliath heron	Sub-Saharan Africa; small population in South Asia.

A number of Ardea species are only known from subfossil or fossil bones. Their placement in Ardea versus Egretta may be provisional:

- Bennu heron, Ardea bennuides (prehistoric)
- Ardea sp. (Middle Miocene of Observation Quarry, US) (fossil)
- Ardea sp. (Late Miocene of Love Bone Bed, US) (fossil)
- Ardea polkensis (Early Pliocene of Bone Valley, US) (fossil)
- Ardea sp. (Early Pleistocene of Macasphalt Shell Pit, US) (fossil)
- Ardea howardae (fossil)

The remains described as Ardea perplexa are nowadays usually believed to be from an ibis of the genus Geronticus or a closely related genera. "Ardea formosa" (a nomen nudum) is now Proardeola; "Ardea" brunhuberi and "A." similis refer to a misidentified cormorant (Phalacrocorax intermedius) and partridge (Miogallus altus), respectively. "Ardea" lignitum – a fossil of quite recent age as it seems – is a type of large owl, perhaps even a Eurasian eagle-owl (Bubo bubo).
