= Bennu =

Ancient Egyptian deity

- The deity, Bennu, wearing the Atef crown
Name in hieroglyphs
G31 G32
- Major cult center: Heliopolis
- Symbol: Grey heron

Bennu (/ˈbɛnuː/) is an ancient Egyptian deity linked with the Sun, creation, and rebirth. He may have been the original inspiration for the phoenix legends that developed in Greek mythology.

== Roles ==
According to Egyptian mythology, Bennu was a self-created being said to have played a role in the creation of the world. He was said to be the ba (personality component of the soul) of the sun deity Ra, and to have enabled the creative actions of Atum. The deity was said to have flown over the waters of Nun that existed before creation, landing on a rock and issuing a call that determined the nature of creation. He was also a symbol of rebirth and, therefore, was associated with Osiris.

Some of the titles of Bennu were "He Who Came Into Being by Himself", and "Lord of Jubilees"; the latter epithet referring to the belief that Bennu periodically renewed himself like the sun was thought to do. His name is related to the Egyptian verb wbn, meaning "to rise in brilliance" or "to shine".

== Depiction ==
The Pyramid Texts, which date to the Old Kingdom, refer to the 'bnw' as a symbol of Atum, and it may have been the original form of Bennu. In that word the shape of a bird used is definitely not that of a heron, but a small singing bird. The German Wörterbuch der ägyptischen Sprache (Dictionary of the Egyptian Language) surmised that might have been a yellow wagtail (Motacilla flava), but no clear reason is given. However, the same bird is used in the spelling of a word 'bn.t' in a painted limestone relief wall fragment from the sun temple of the Vth Dynasty Old Kingdom king Niuserre. The hieroglyph clearly shows traces of blue-grey paint on much of the bird's body, indicating a different bird species. Rather, the shape and colour seem to point to a (Mediterranean) Kingfisher (Alcedo atthis) for which, however, another name was in use: 'hn.t<y' (lit. 'the one of the canal'). It could be surmised that a Kingfisher flying low over water and shrieking loudly would be a reasonable basis for the mythical creator deity Atum of Heliopolis as having risen from the first dark waters, called Nun, in order to start his creation of the world. If so, the Kingfisher 'bnw' or 'bn.t' is a good match for the mythical and cultic Nile goose (i.e. 'smn') of the creator deity Amun in later periods, imagined to have been honking loudly in the primeval dark above the still waters in order to bring forth all creation by its voice.

New Kingdom artwork shows Bennu as a huge grey heron with a long beak and a two-feathered crest. Sometimes Bennu is depicted as perched on a benben stone (representing Ra and the name of the top stone of a pyramid) or in a willow tree (representing Osiris). Because of the connection with Osiris, Bennu sometimes wears the Atef crown, instead of the solar disk.

== Possible animal model ==
Remains of a giant, human-sized heron species, thought to have gone extinct around 1500 BC, were discovered in the United Arab Emirates in 1977. It lived on the Arabian Peninsula and shared many characteristics with Bennu, and scientists believe it may have been the animal model for the deity. In reference to this, archaeologist Dr. Ella Hoch from the Geological Museum at Copenhagen University named it the Bennu heron (Ardea bennuides).

== Worship ==
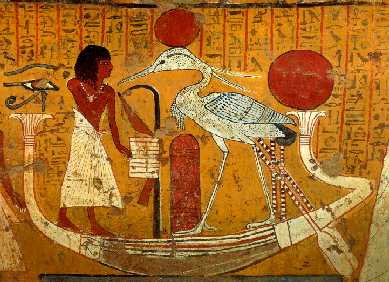
A depiction of Bennu with a sun disk on his head, from the tomb of Irynefer at Deir el-Medina

Like Atum and Ra, Bennu was probably worshipped in the deities' cult centre at Heliopolis. Bennu also appears on funerary scarab amulets as a symbol of rebirth.

== Connection with the Greek phoenix ==
The Greek historian Herodotus, writing about Egyptian customs and traditions in the fifth century BC, wrote that the people at Heliopolis described the phoenix to him. They said it lived for 500 years before dying, resuscitating, building a funerary egg with myrrh for the paternal corpse, and carrying it to the temple of the Sun at Heliopolis. His description of the phoenix likens it to an eagle with red and gold plumage, reminiscent of the sun.

Long after Herodotus, the theme of the fire, pyre, and ashes of the dying bird, ultimately associated with the Greek phoenix, developed in Greek traditions.

The name "phoenix" could be derived from "Bennu", and its rebirth and connections with the sun resemble the beliefs about Bennu; however, Egyptian sources do not mention a death of the deity.

== See also ==
- Fenghuang – Mythological birds in Sinosphere traditions
- Firebird (Slavic folklore) – Magical glowing bird in Slavic folklore
- Vermilion Bird – One of the Four Symbols of the Chinese constellations
