= Grey heron =

- A grey heron (Ardea cinerea) standing in the rushing water of a river. The bird is captured in a side profile while hunting for prey.

Conservation status
- Least Concern (IUCN 3.1)

Scientific classification
- Kingdom: Animalia
- Phylum: Chordata
- Class: Aves
- Order: Pelecaniformes
- Family: Ardeidae
- Genus: Ardea
- Species: A. cinerea

Binomial name
- Ardea cinerea Linnaeus, 1758
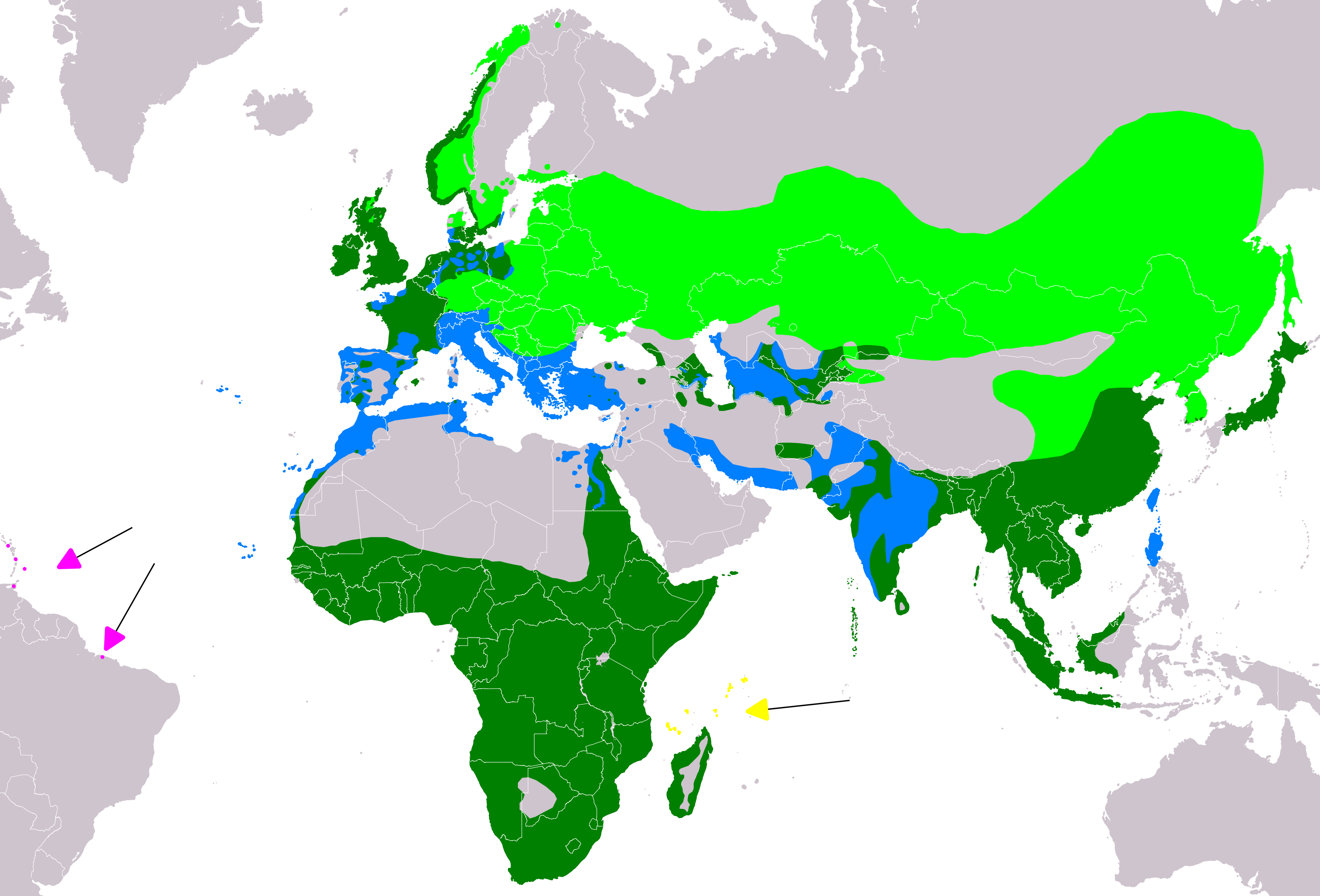
- Range of A. cinerea Breeding Resident Non-breeding Vagrant (seasonality uncertain) Extant & Introduced (resident)

Audio

Long-legged predatory wading bird

The grey heron (Ardea cinerea) is a long-legged wading bird of the heron family, Ardeidae, native throughout Europe, Asia, and most of Africa. It is resident in much of its range, but some populations from the more northern parts migrate southwards in autumn. A bird of wetland areas, it can be seen around lakes, rivers, ponds, marshes and on the sea coast. It feeds mostly on aquatic creatures which it catches after standing stationary beside or in the water, or stalking its prey through the shallows.

Standing up to 1 metre (3 ft 3 in) tall, adults weigh from 1 to 2 kg (2 to 4 lb). They have a white head and neck with a broad black stripe that extends from the eye to the black crest. The body and wings are grey above and the underparts are greyish-white, with some black on the flanks. The long, sharply pointed beak is pinkish-yellow and the legs are brown.

The birds breed colonially in spring in heronries, usually building their nests high in trees. A clutch of usually three to five bluish-green eggs is laid. Both birds incubate the eggs for around 25 days, and then both feed the chicks, which fledge when 7–8 weeks old. Many juveniles do not survive their first winter, but if they do, they can expect to live for about 5 years.

In Ancient Egypt, the deity Bennu was depicted as a heron in New Kingdom artwork. In Ancient Rome, the heron was a bird of divination. Roast heron was once a specially prized dish; when George Neville became Archbishop of York in 1465, 400 herons were served to the guests.

== Taxonomy ==
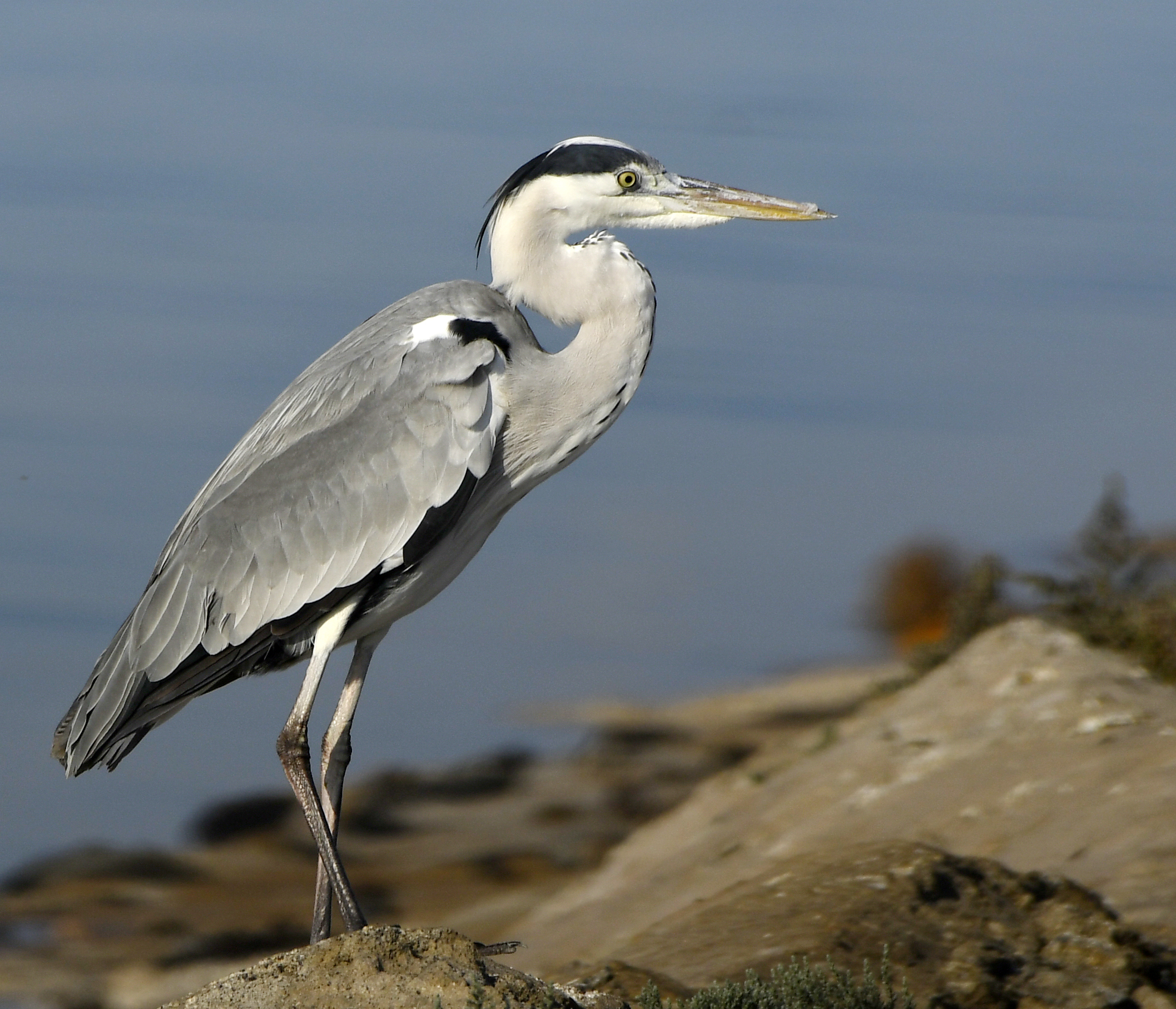
A. c. cinerea at Jamnagar, India

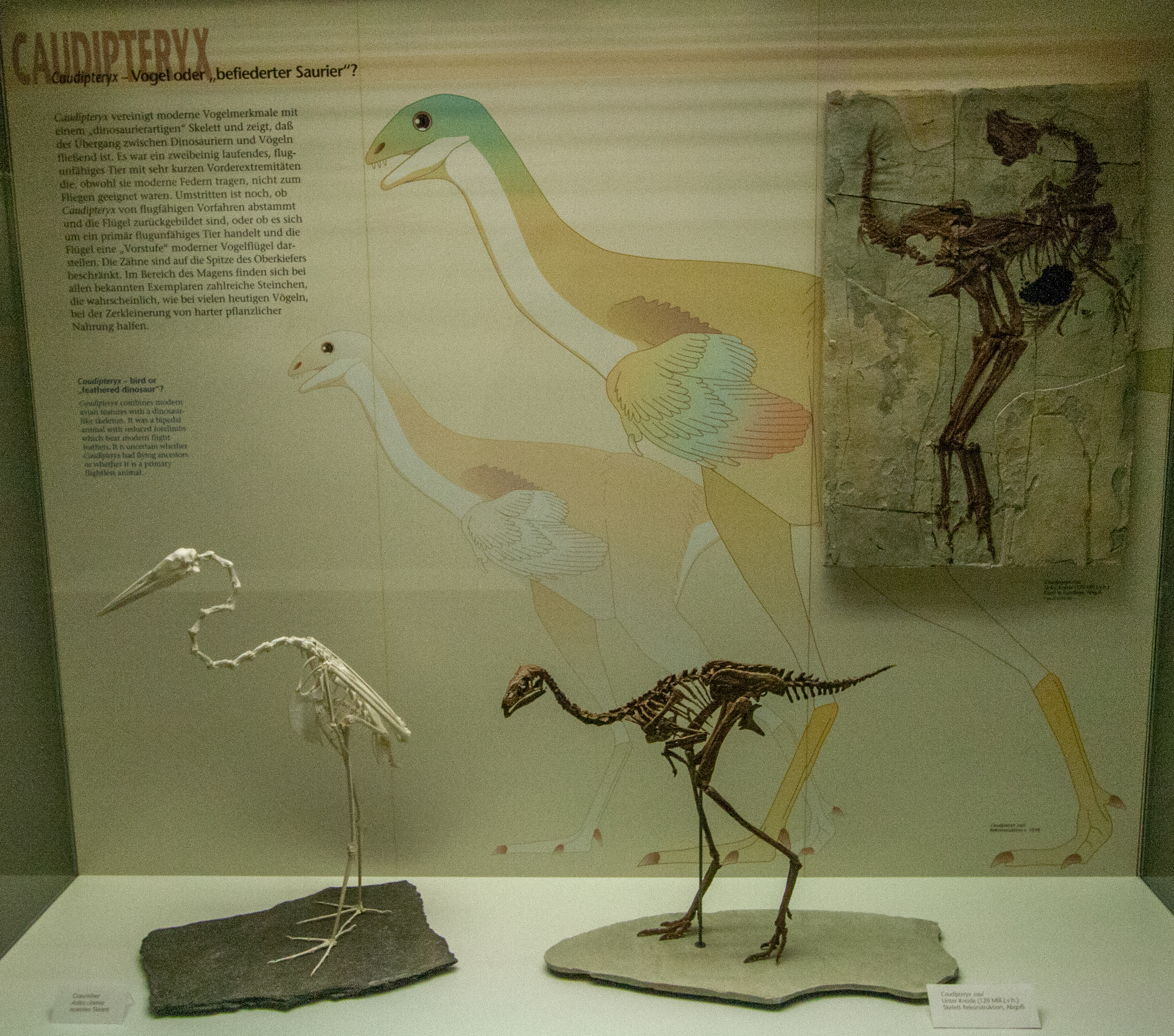
Grey heron and Caudipteryx skeletons

Grey herons belong to the subfamily Ardeinae, along with the majority of extant species, which are known as the "typical herons". The grey heron was formally described by the Swedish naturalist Carl Linnaeus in 1758 in the tenth edition of his Systema Naturae. He placed it with the cattle egret and the great egret in the genus Ardea and coined the binomial name Ardea cinerea. The scientific name comes from the Latin ardea meaning "heron" and cinereus meaning "ash-grey" or "ash-coloured".

Four subspecies are recognised:

- A. c. cinerea – Linnaeus, 1758: nominate, found in Europe, Africa, western Asia
- A. c. jouyi – Clark, 1907: found in eastern Asia
- A. c. firasa – Hartert, 1917: found in Madagascar
- A. c. monicae – Jouanin & Roux, 1963: found on islands off Banc d'Arguin, Mauritania.

It is closely related and similar to the North American great blue heron (Ardea herodias), which differs in being larger, and having chestnut-brown flanks and thighs; and to the cocoi heron (Ardea cocoi) from South America, with which it forms a superspecies. Some authorities believe that the subspecies A. c. monicae should be considered a separate species. The grey heron sometimes hybridises with the great egret (Ardea alba), the little egret (Egretta garzetta), the great blue heron and the purple heron (Ardea purpurea). The Australian white-faced heron is often incorrectly called a grey heron. In Ireland, the grey heron is often colloquially called a "crane".

== Description ==
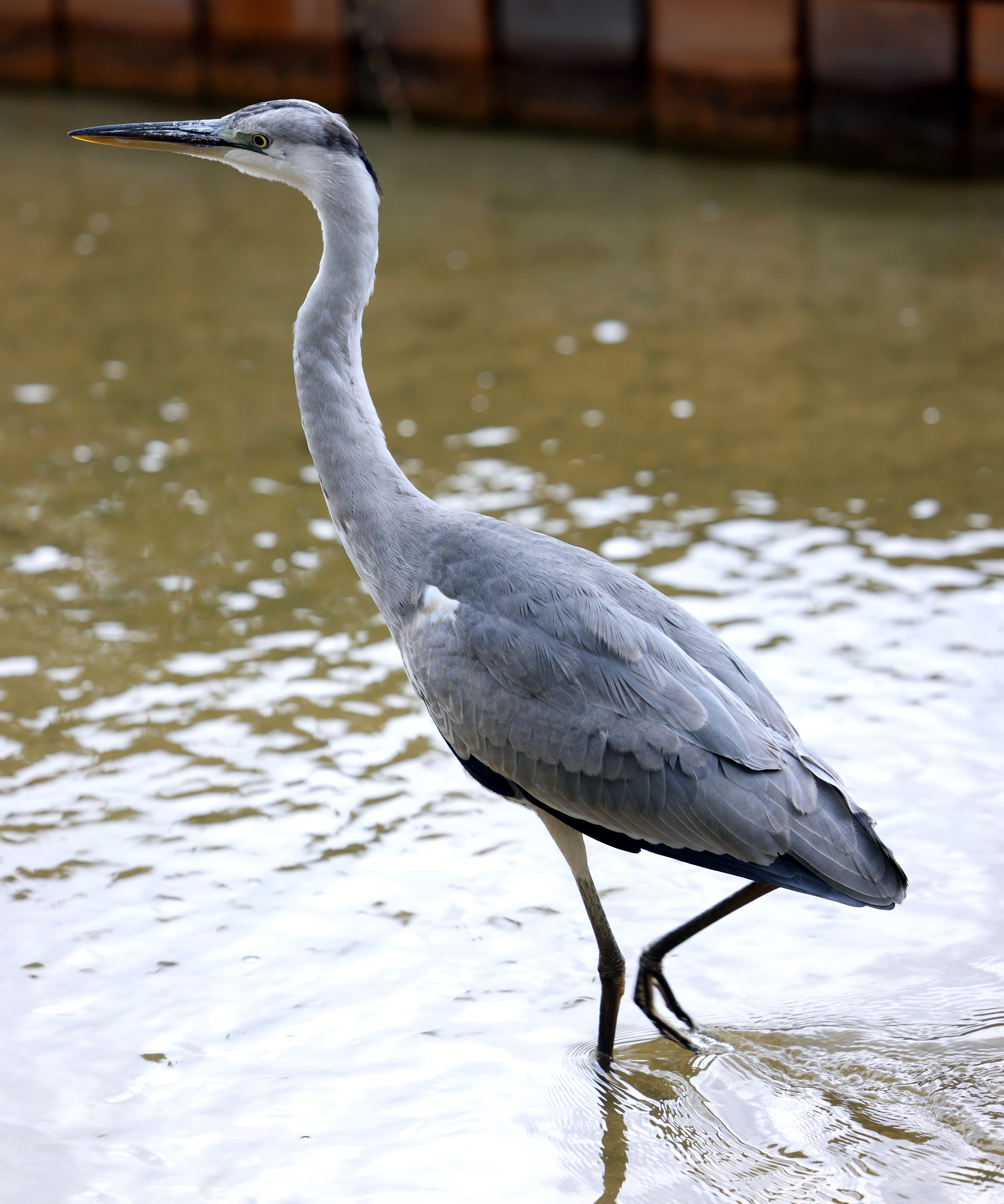
Immature, Ōhori Park in Fukuoka, Japan

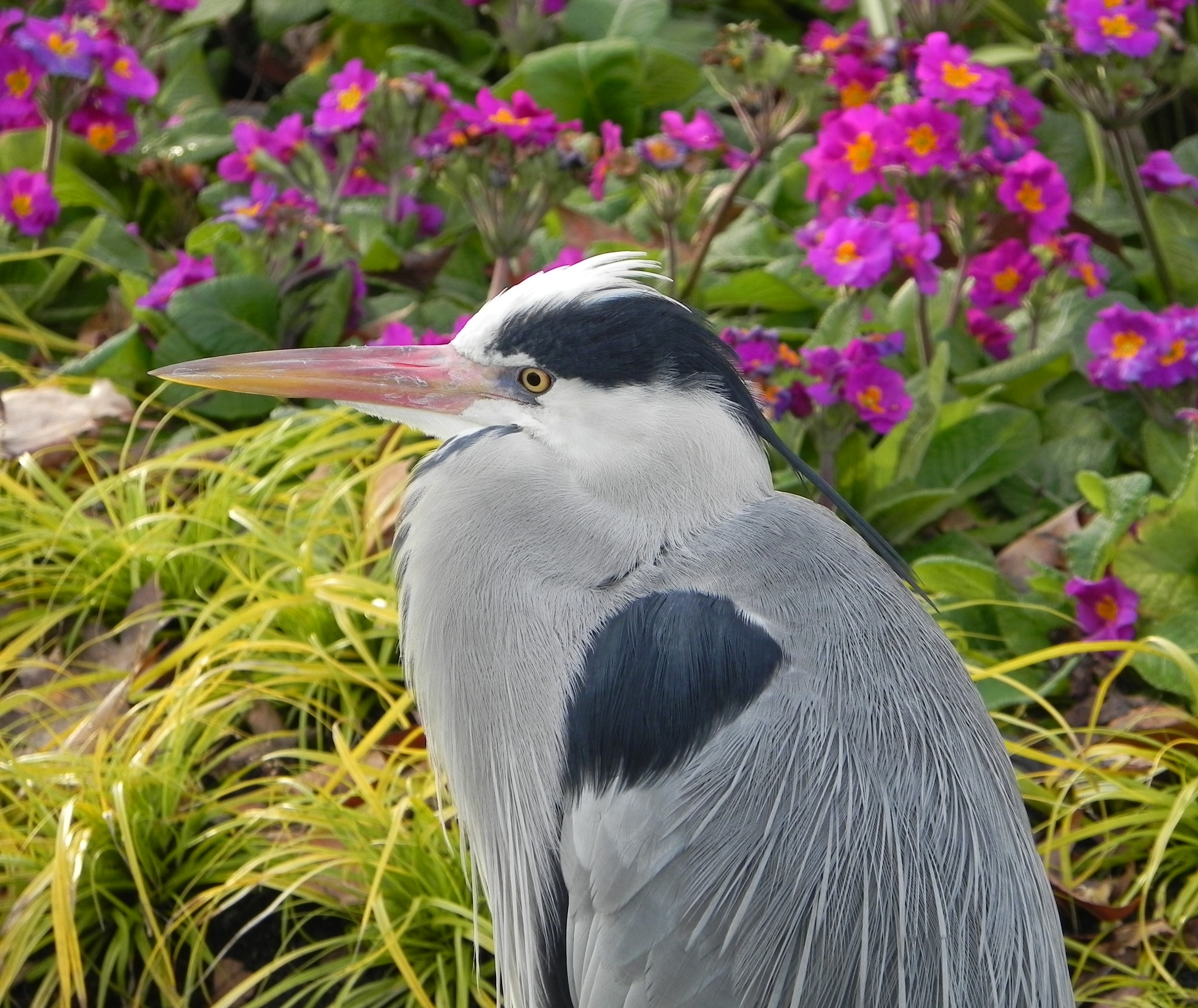
Head, with neck retracted

The grey heron is a large bird, standing up to 100 cm (40 in) tall and measuring 84–102 cm (33–40 in) long with a 155–195 cm (61–77 in) wingspan. The body weight can range from 1.02–2.08 kg (2 lb 4 oz – 4 lb 9 1/4 oz). The plumage is largely ashy-grey above, and greyish-white below, with some black on the flanks. Adults have a white head and neck with a broad black supercilium that terminates in the slender, dangling crest, and bluish-black streaks on the front of the neck. The scapular feathers and the feathers at the base of the neck are somewhat elongated. In immature birds the adult's black stripe on the head is grey, and the white face paler grey; they are generally duller in appearance than adults, with only a small, dark grey crest. The pinkish-yellow beak is long, straight, and powerful, and is brighter colour in breeding adults. The iris is yellow and the legs are brown and very long.

The main call is a loud croaking "fraaank", but a variety of guttural and raucous noises are heard at the breeding colony. The male uses an advertisement call to encourage a female to join him at the nest, and both sexes use various greeting calls after a pair bond has been established. A loud, harsh "schaah" is used by the male in driving other birds from the vicinity of the nest and a soft "gogogo" expresses anxiety, as when a predator is nearby or a human walks past the colony. The chicks utter loud chattering or ticking noises.

== Distribution and habitat ==
Grey heron flies a short distance in a Tokyo park, 2021.

The grey heron has an extensive range throughout most of the Palearctic realm. The range of the nominate subspecies A. c. cinerea extends to 70° N in Norway and 66°N in Sweden, but its northerly limit is around 60°N across the rest of Europe and Asia, as far eastwards as the Ural Mountains. To the south, its range extends to northern Spain, France, central Italy, the Balkans, the Caucasus, Iraq, Iran, India, The Maldives and Myanmar (Burma). It is also present in Africa south of the Sahara Desert, the Canary Islands, Morocco, Algeria, Tunisia, and many of the Mediterranean Islands. It is replaced by A. c. jouyi in eastern Siberia, Mongolia, eastern China, Hainan, Japan, and Taiwan. In Madagascar and the Aldabra Islands, the subspecies A. c. firasa is found, while the subspecies A. c. monicae is restricted to Mauritania and offshore islands.

Over much of its range, the grey heron is resident, but birds from the more northerly parts of Europe migrate southwards, some remaining in Central and Southern Europe, others travelling on to Africa south of the Sahara Desert.

A GPS/GSM tracking study followed one adult grey heron for two consecutive years between its wintering grounds at Dongting Lake in China and its breeding grounds in the Jewish Autonomous Oblast of Russia, with a post-breeding area near Jiamusi. The tracked bird travelled during both day and night without using stopover sites, while its habitat use varied between stages of its annual cycle; agricultural habitats were used more frequently in winter.

The grey heron is also known to be vagrant in the Caribbean, Bermuda, Iceland, Greenland, the Aleutian Islands, and Newfoundland, with a few confirmed sightings in other parts of North America including Nova Scotia and Nantucket. In South America, the majority of the sightings come from Brazil, especially in Fernando de Noronha. There is also an old record from Colombia.

Within its range, the grey heron can be found anywhere with suitable watery habitat that can supply its food. The water body must be either shallow enough, or have a shelving margin in it, so that it can wade. Although most common in the lowlands, it also occurs in mountain tarns, lakes, reservoirs, rivers, marshes, ponds, ditches, flooded areas, coastal lagoons, estuaries, and the sea shore. It sometimes forages away from water in pasture, and it has been recorded in desert areas, hunting for beetles and lizards. Breeding colonies are usually near feeding areas, but exceptionally may be up to eight kilometres (five miles) away, and birds sometimes forage as much as 20 km (12 mi) from the nesting site.

== Behaviour ==
The grey heron has a slow flight, with its long neck retracted in an S-shape. This is characteristic of herons and bitterns, and distinguishes them from storks, cranes, and spoonbills, which extend their necks. It flies with slow wing-beats and sometimes glides for short distances. It sometimes soars, circling to considerable heights, but not as often as the stork. In spring, and occasionally in autumn, birds may soar high above the heronry and chase each other, undertake aerial manoeuvres or swoop down towards the ground. The birds often perch in trees, but spend much time on the ground, striding about or standing still for long periods with an upright stance, often on a single leg.

=== Diet and feeding ===
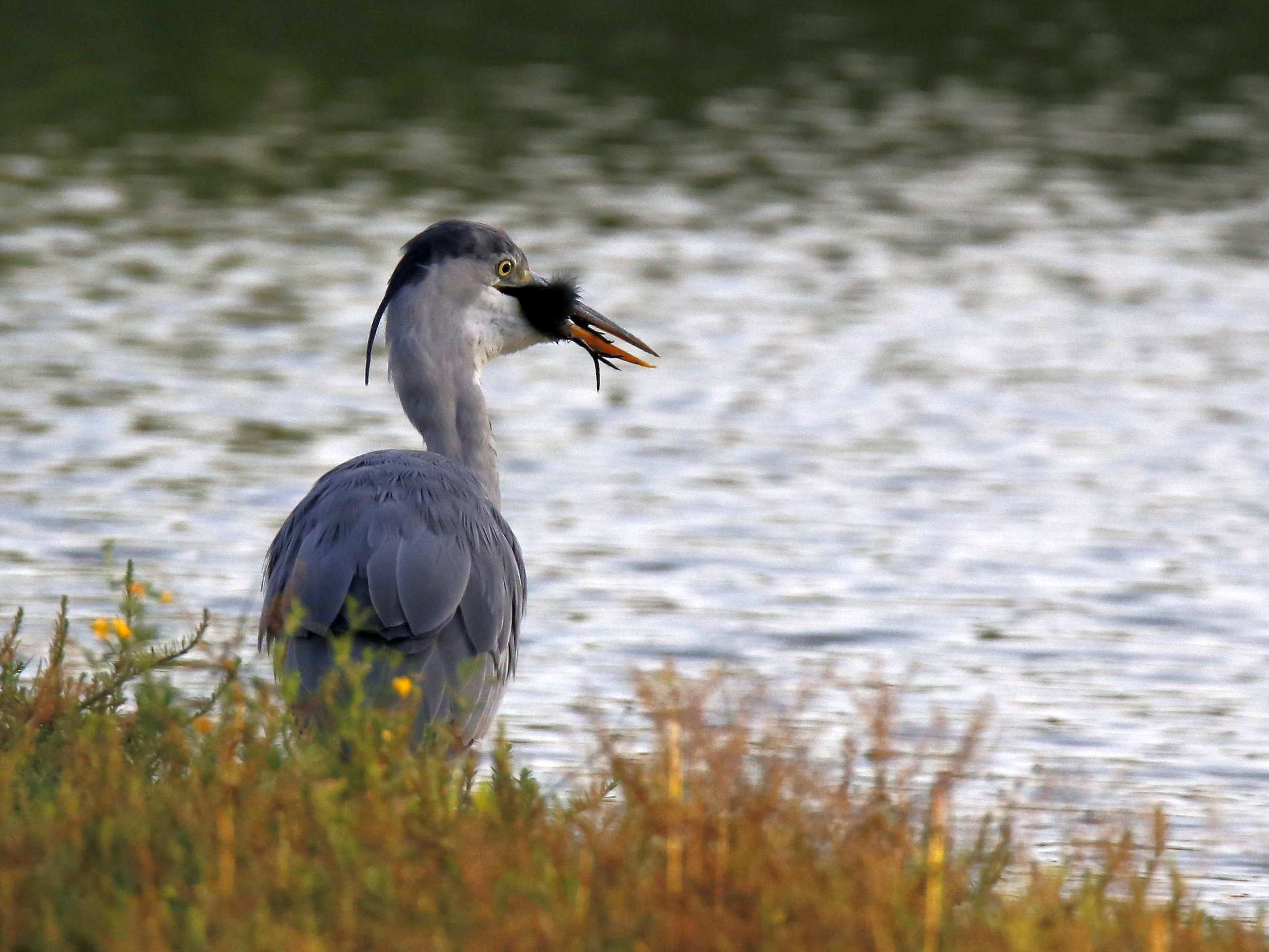
Grey heron eating a juvenile common moorhen

Grey herons are important predators in their aquatic ecosystem. Fish, amphibians, crustaceans, and insects are caught in shallow water with the heron's long bill. It has also been observed catching and killing juvenile birds such as ducklings, and occasionally takes birds up to the size of a water rail or white-throated rail. Small mammals such as water voles, rats, stoats and young rabbits are additionally caught. Recently, the grey heron has been observed to use the 'stress and wash' technique which is believed to make great crested newts (Triturus cristatus) and smooth newts (Lissotriton vulgaris) more palatable by flushing their skin free of toxins before consumption.

Prey items vary in size from 1 cm-long fish and invertebrates, weighing less than 1g, to 30 cm-long carps and 57cm eels. While chicks tend to have smaller prey, individual prey caught by fully-grown Grey Herons commonly exceed 100g in weight and occasionally exceed 500g. One paper reports that an adult heron managed to catch and swallow sea trout weighing 680g. It may stand motionless in the shallows, or on a rock or sandbank beside the water, waiting for prey to come within striking distance. Alternatively, it moves slowly and stealthily through the water with its body less upright than when at rest and its neck curved in an "S". It is then able to straighten its neck and strike with its bill very quickly. Small fish are swallowed head first, and larger prey and eels are carried to the shore where they are subdued by being beaten on the ground or stabbed by the bill. They are then swallowed or have hunks of flesh torn off. For prey such as small mammals and birds or ducklings, the prey is held by the neck and either drowned, suffocated, has its neck snapped with the heron's beak, or is bludgeoned against the ground or a nearby rock, before being swallowed whole. The bird regurgitates pellets of indigestible material such as fur, bones, and the chitinous remains of insects. The main hunting periods are around dawn and dusk, but it is also active at other times of the day. At night it roosts in trees or on cliffs, where it tends to be gregarious.

=== Breeding ===
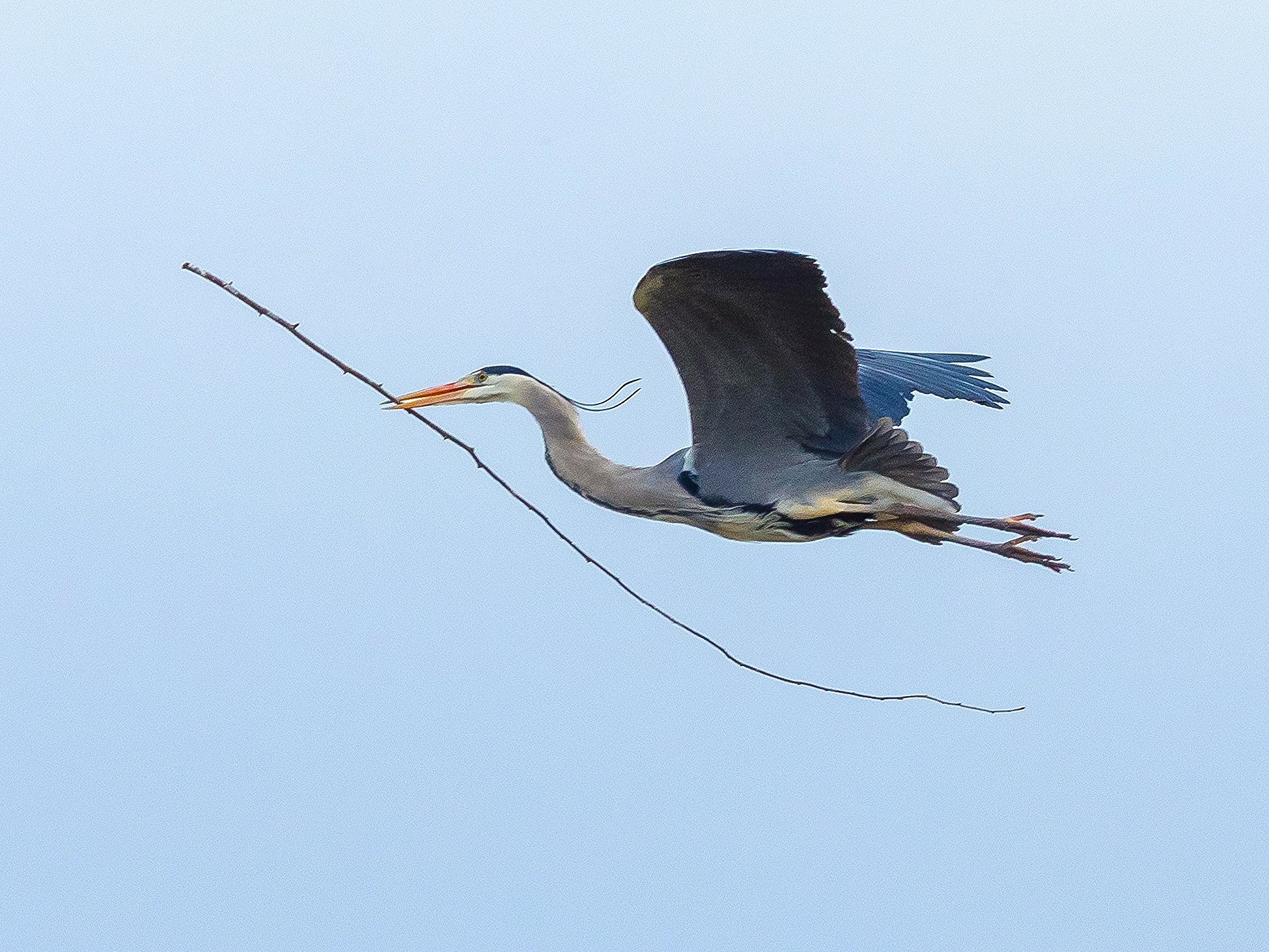
Grey heron flying with nesting material in Stockholm, Sweden

This species breeds in colonies known as heronries, usually in high trees close to lakes, the seashore, or other wetlands. Other sites are sometimes chosen, and these include low trees and bushes, bramble patches, reed beds, heather clumps and cliff ledges. The same nest is used year after year until blown down; it starts as a small platform of sticks but expands into a bulky nest as more material is added in subsequent years. It may be lined with smaller twigs, strands of root or dead grasses; in reed beds, it is built from dead reeds. The male usually collects the material, while the female constructs the nest. Breeding activities take place between February and June. When a bird arrives at the nest, a greeting ceremony occurs in which each partner raises and lowers its wings and plumes. In continental Europe, and elsewhere, nesting colonies sometimes include nests of the purple heron and other heron species.

Courtship involves the male calling from his chosen nesting site. On the arrival of the female, both birds participate in a stretching ceremony, in which each bird extends its neck vertically before bringing it backwards and downwards with the bill remaining vertical, simultaneously flexing its legs, before returning to its normal stance. The snapping ceremony is another behaviour where the neck is extended forward, the head is lowered to the level of the feet, and the mandibles are vigorously snapped together. This may be repeated 20–40 times. When the pairing is settled, the birds may caress each other by attending to the other bird's plumage. The male may then offer the female a stick, which she incorporates into the nest. At this, the male becomes excited, further preening the female, and copulation takes place.

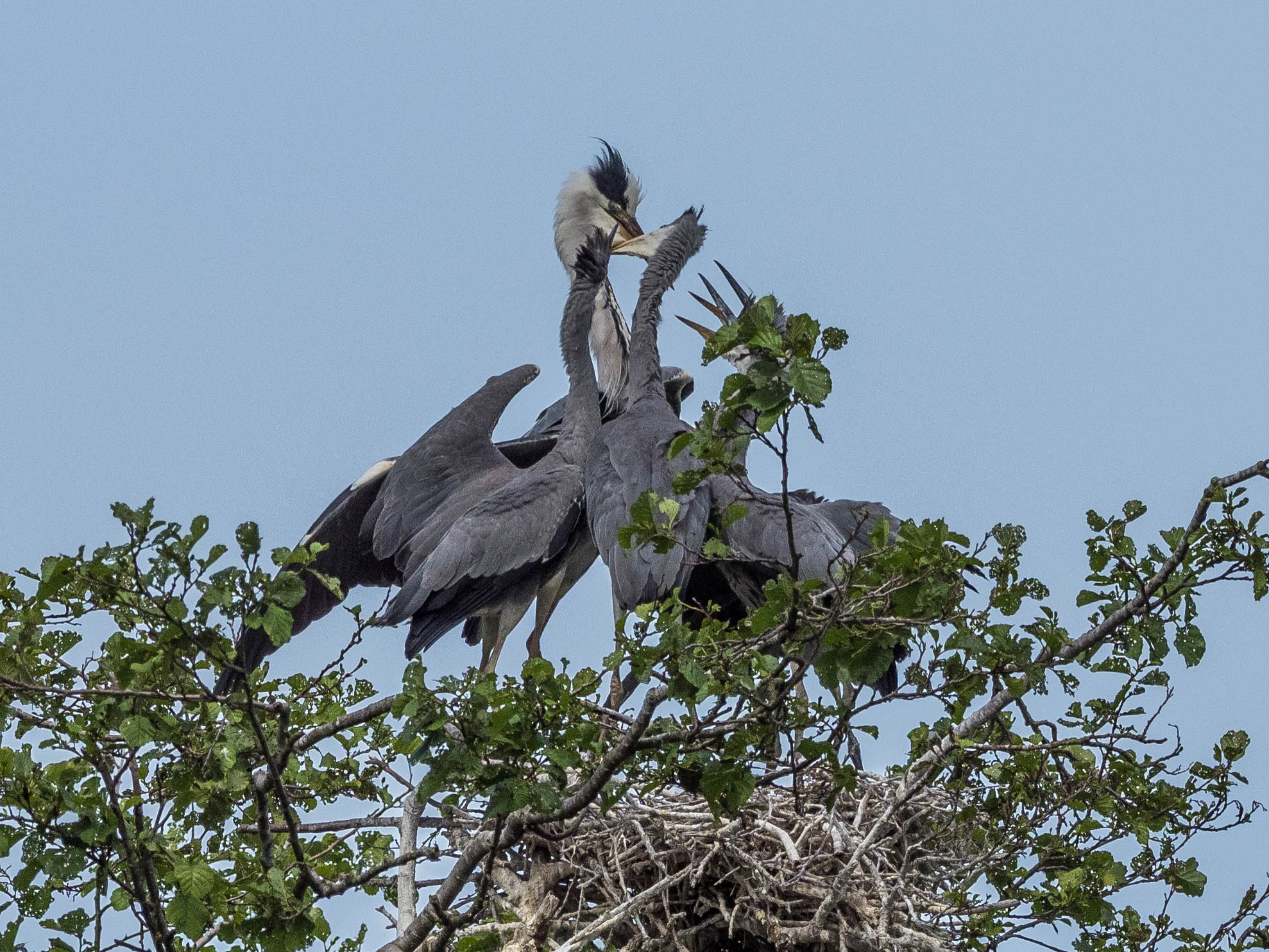
An adult feeding juveniles

The clutch of eggs usually numbers three to five, though as few as two and as many as seven eggs have been recorded. The eggs have a matt surface and are greenish-blue, averaging 60 mm × 43 mm (2 3/8 in × 1 11/16 in). The eggs are normally laid at two-day intervals and incubation usually starts after the first or second egg has been laid. Both birds take part in incubation and the period lasts about 25 days. Both parents bring food for the young. At first, the chicks seize the adult's bill from the side and extract regurgitated food from it. Later, the adult disgorges the food at the nest and the chicks squabble for possession. They fledge at 7–8 weeks. Usually, a single brood is raised each year, but two broods have been recorded.

The oldest recorded bird lived for 23 years, but the average life expectancy in the wild is about 5 years. Only about a third of juveniles survive into their second year, many falling victim to predation.

On 24 May 1990, on the proposal of Marek Vahula, the nesting colony of Vandu village of Kadrina municipality in Estonia (up to 125 nesting trees) was taken under protection in the 1st place. In the spring-winter of 2001, all suitable nesting trees were cut down there in defiance of the conservation regulations. Driven by this, the nationwide heron protection and research project "The Heron Seeker" was brought to life. In seven years (2007–2014) all nesting colonies and feeding grounds in Estonia were mapped. The project's final result was the English-language E-book: "Heron Seeker`s book" Tallinn, 2024. (ISBN 978-9916-9943-3-7).

=== City life ===
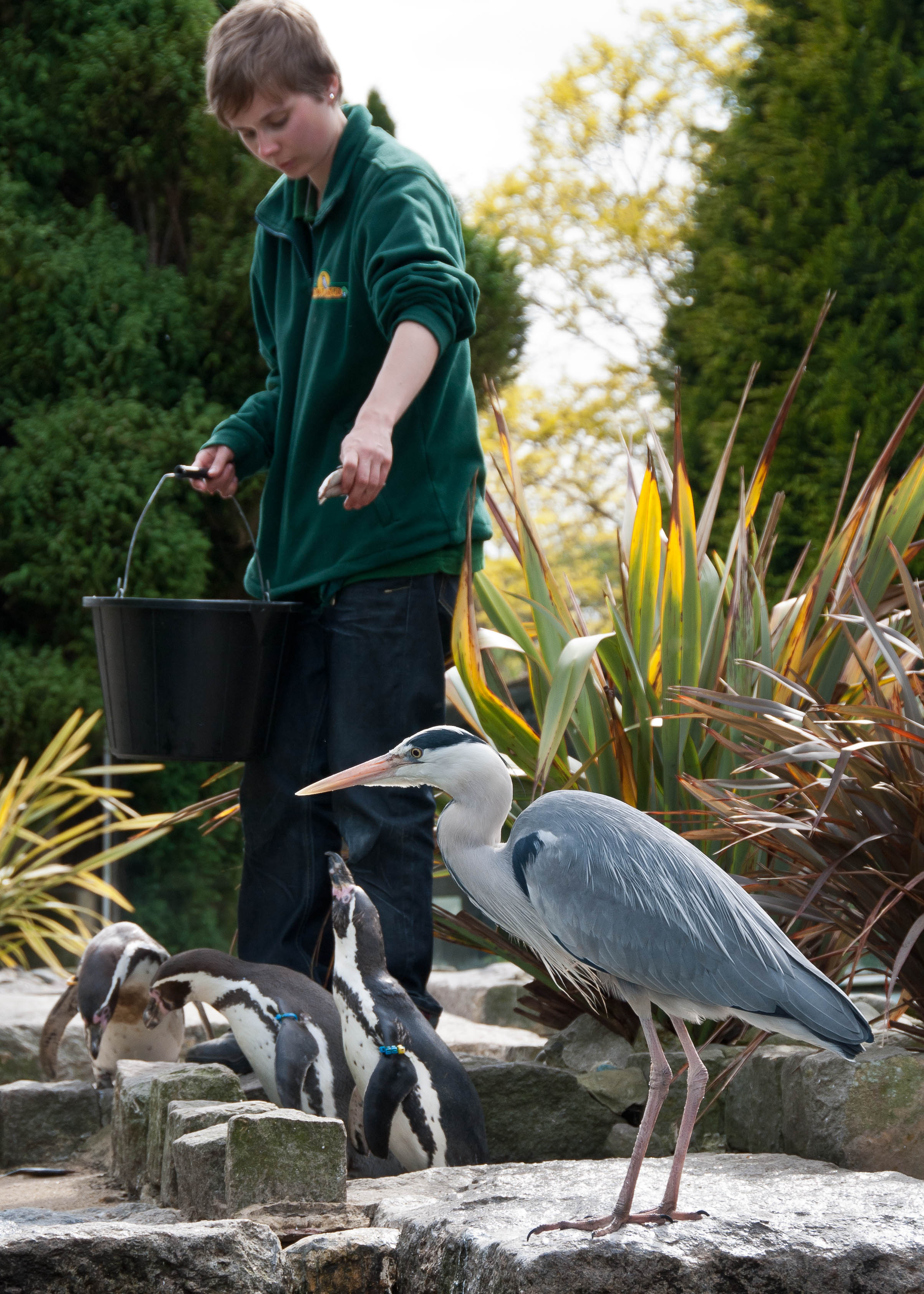
A wild heron seeking food from a Humboldt penguin enclosure at Birdworld

Grey herons have the ability to live in cities where habitats and nesting space are available. In the Netherlands, it has established itself over the past decades in great numbers in urban environments. In cities such as Amsterdam, they are ever present and well adapted to modern city life. They hunt as usual, but also visit street markets and snack bars. Some individuals make use of people feeding them at their homes or share the catch of recreational fishermen. Similar behaviour on a smaller scale has been reported in Ireland. Garden ponds stocked with ornamental fish are attractive to herons, and the easy prey may provide young birds with a learning opportunity on how to hunt.

Herons have been observed visiting water enclosures in zoos, such as spaces for penguins, otters, pelicans, and seals, and taking food meant for the animals on display.

=== Harm caused by grey herons ===
In a variety of sources, one can find a common statement that grey herons, by eating large quantities of fish, is a significant pest of fisheries, causing damage to the population of valuable fish both in natural reservoirs and in ponds intended for the cultivation of cultivated fish species.

For example, in the 1970s, major Soviet experts considered the grey heron to be a harmful species, for example, for fish breeding reservoirs in Ukraine. In particular, it was established that in Ukraine and in general in the southern regions of the USSR, carp and mullet suffered from heron farms (there, in addition, the heron caught fish in the dark, which made it difficult to fight it). It was undoubtedly noted that grey herons, especially in the post-nesting period, when forage migrations begin, gather in significant numbers on fish ponds and then eat many juveniles of cultivated fish species. In the Kuban delta, the share of valuable, specially cultivated species was significant in the hunting of the grey heron, of which 84% were carp, 12% were white carp, and 4% were bighead carp.

According to studies at fish ponds in Upper Lusatia in Germany, the grey heron does cause significant damage to fisheries, but the damage caused by eating valuable fish species is balanced by the fact that it eats a large number of fish affected by ligulosis. The undoubted benefit of the heron is also expressed in the fact that it eats a lot of harmful insects. However, in some places, grey herons can serve as a breeding ground for the so-called ink sickness, or postodiplostomosis, a dangerous disease of young cyprinids.

In addition, large colonies of grey herons can have a significant impact on soil biogeochemistry and vegetation. For example, a heron colony in one study site located near the southern edge of the Republic of Tatarstan on a peninsula formed by the confluence of the Volga, the largest and longest river in Europe, and its largest tributary, the Kama, on the banks of the smaller river Myosha (a tributary of the Kama); after settling around 2006, it expanded for 15 years, leading to the intensive deposition of nutrients with faeces, food remains and feathers thereby considerably altering the local soil biogeochemistry. Thus, lower pH levels around 4.5, 10- and 2-fold higher concentrations of phosphorus and nitrogen, as well as 1.2-fold discrepancies in K, Li, Mn, Zn and Co, respectively, compared to the surrounding control forest area could be observed.

== Predators and parasites ==
Being large birds with powerful beaks, grey herons have few predators as adults, but white-tailed eagles, golden eagles and more rarely Eurasian goshawks will take them as prey. The eggs and young are more vulnerable; the adult birds do not usually leave the nest unattended, but may be lured away by marauding crows or kites. A dead grey heron found in the Pyrenees is thought to have been killed by an otter. The bird may have been weakened by harsh winter weather causing scarcity of its prey.

A study performed by Sitko and Heneberg in the Czech Republic between 1962 and 2013 suggested that Central European grey herons host 29 species of parasitic worms. The dominant species consisted of Apharyngostrigea cornu (67% prevalence), Posthodiplostomum cuticola (41% prevalence), Echinochasmus beleocephalus (39% prevalence), Uroproctepisthmium bursicola (36% prevalence), Neogryporhynchus cheilancristrotus (31% prevalence), Desmidocercella numidica (29% prevalence), and Bilharziella polonica (5% prevalence). Juvenile grey herons were shown to host fewer species, but the intensity of infection was higher in the juveniles than in the adult herons. Of the digenean flatworms found in Central European grey herons, 52% of the species likely infected their definitive hosts outside Central Europe itself, in the premigratory, migratory, or wintering quarters, despite the fact that a substantial proportion of grey herons do not migrate to the south.

== In human culture ==
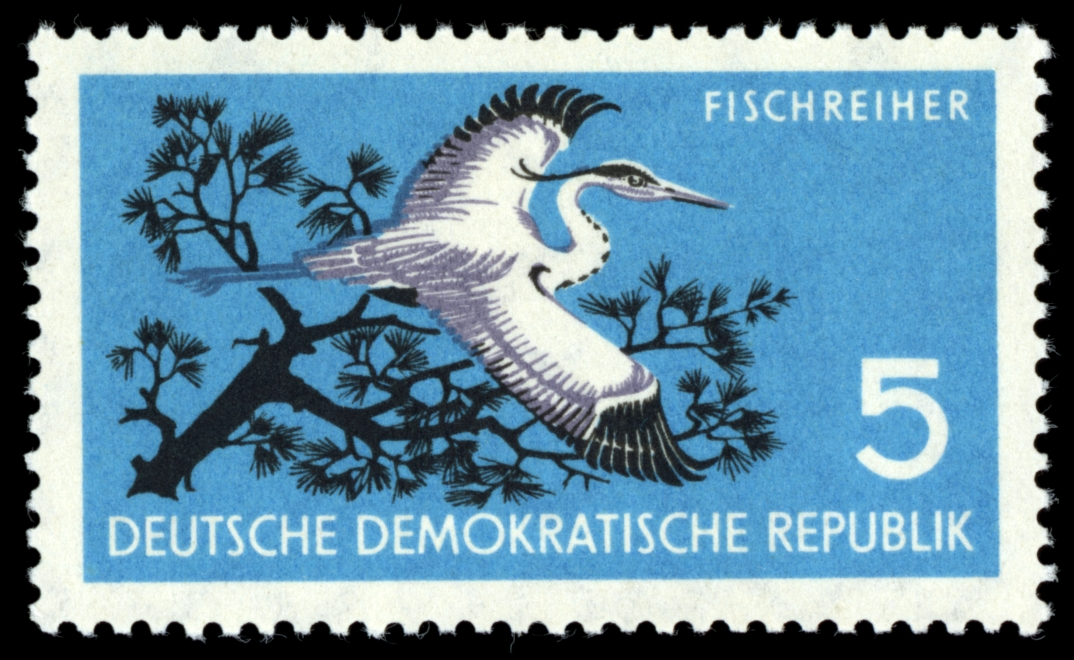
East German postal stamp, 1959

Bennu, an ancient Egyptian deity associated with the sun, creation, and rebirth, was depicted as a heron in New Kingdom artwork.

In ancient Rome, the heron was a bird of divination that gave an augury (sign of a coming event) by its call, like the raven, stork, and owl.

During the Middle Ages in the British Isles, herons were associated with chivalry and commonly featured on coats of arms, as their stoic stance while fishing came to be associated with virtues such as patience, contemplation and nobility. Roast heron was once a specially prized dish in Britain for special occasions such as state banquets. For the appointment of George Neville as Archbishop of York in 1465, 400 herons were served to the guests. Young birds were still being shot and eaten in Romney Marsh in 1896. Two grey herons feature in a stained-glass window of the church in Selborne, Hampshire.

The English surnames Earnshaw, Hernshaw, Herne, and Heron all derive from the heron, the suffix -shaw meaning a wood, referring to a place where herons nested.

The bird is common in the Maldives under the name of Maakana and has given its name to the character of a satirical television show.
