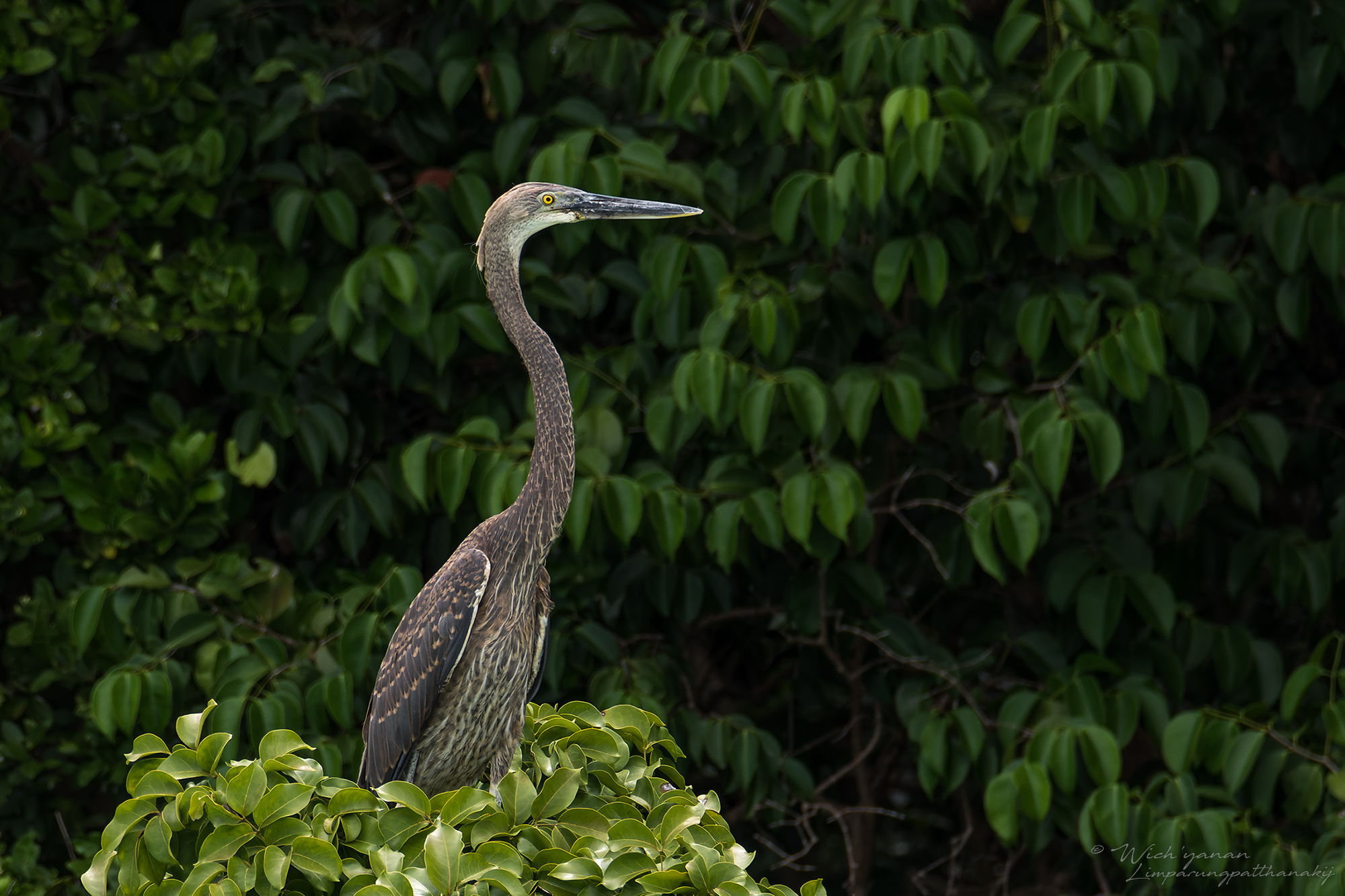

Conservation status
- Least Concern (IUCN 3.1)

Scientific classification
- Kingdom: Animalia
- Phylum: Chordata
- Class: Aves
- Order: Pelecaniformes
- Family: Ardeidae
- Genus: Ardea
- Species: A. sumatrana

Binomial name
- Ardea sumatrana Raffles, 1822

= Great-billed heron =

Species of bird

The great-billed heron (Ardea sumatrana) is a wading bird of the heron family, resident from southeast Asia to Papua New Guinea and Australia.

== Description ==
The great-billed heron is a large bird, typically standing 115 cm (45 in) tall and weighing up to 2.6 kg (5.7 lb). It resembles the purple heron in appearance, although it is larger and darker. The plumage is largely dark grey above. In flight, it has a uniform dark grey upperwing.

The flight is slow, with its neck retracted. This is characteristic of herons and bitterns, and distinguishes them from storks, cranes and spoonbills, which extend their necks. The species feeds in shallow water, spearing fish with its long, sharp bill. It will wait motionless for prey, or slowly stalk its victim.

== Subspecies ==
Great-billed heron is polytypic, meaning that it has more than one subspecies. The two subspecies are most easily distinguished by their different locations:

- Ardea sumatrana mathewsae is found on the coasts of tropical northern Australia
- Ardea sumatrana sumatrana is found on the coasts of southeastern Asia, Indonesia, Philippines, and New Guinea
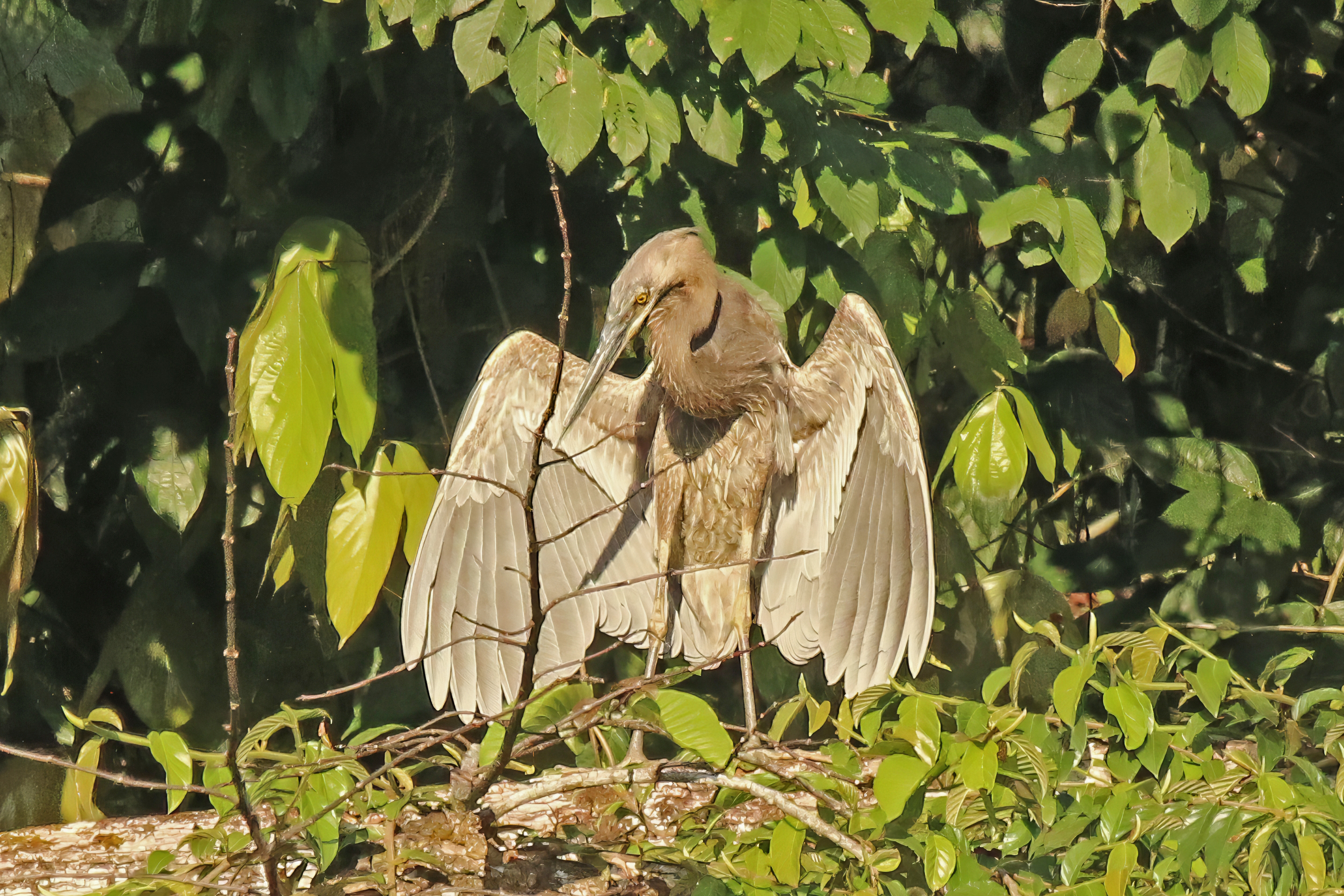
A. s. sumatrana, Borneo

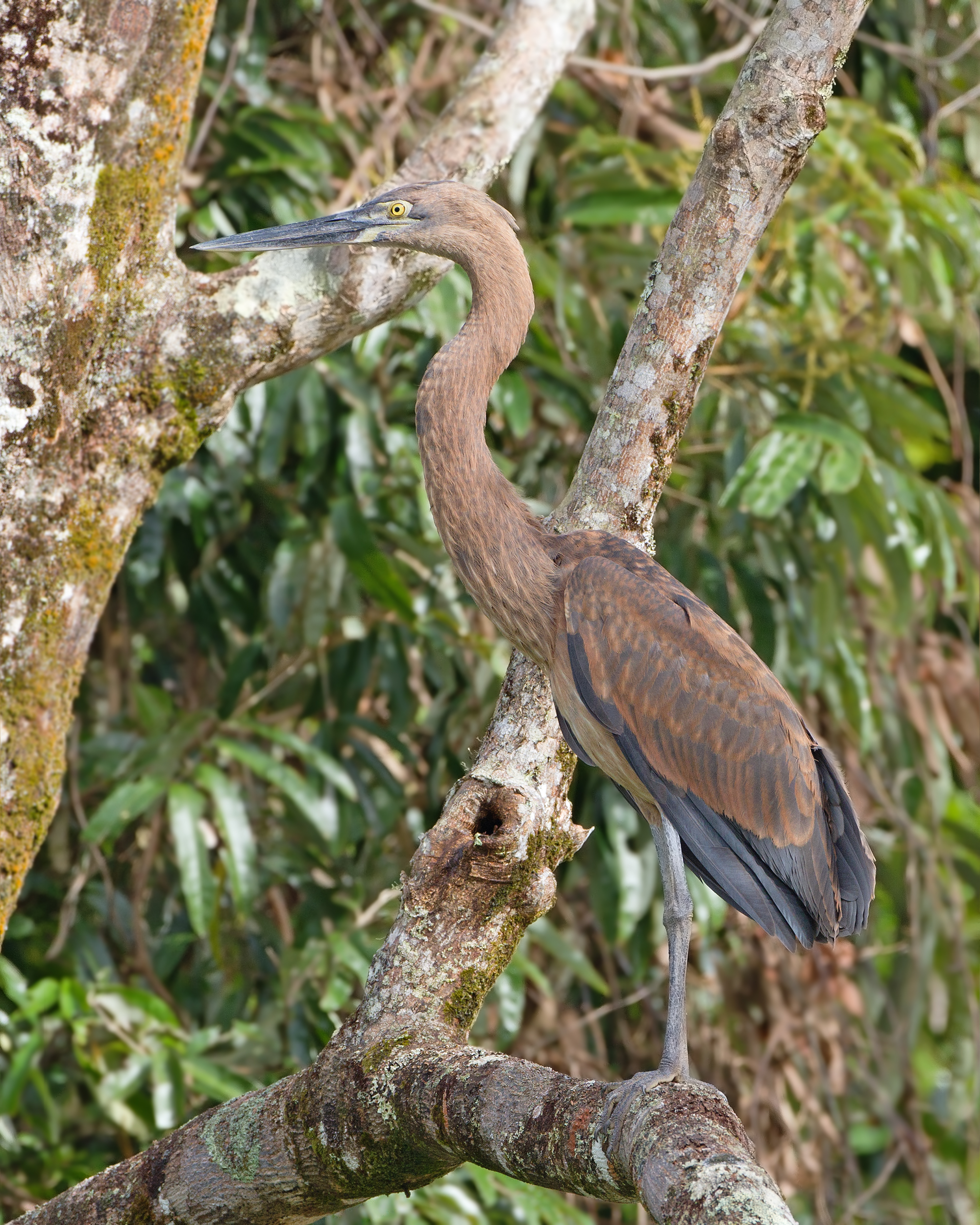
Juvenile A. s. mathewsae, Daintree

== Distribution and habitat ==
The great-billed heron has a very large range, occurring in much of coastal Southern Asia and Australasia including Australia, India, Indonesia, Malaysia, and the Philippines. Its habitats are largely coastal such as islands, coral reefs, mangroves, large rivers. However, occasionally, it can be found inland in shallow ponds.

It is considered to be native in Queensland, Australia.
