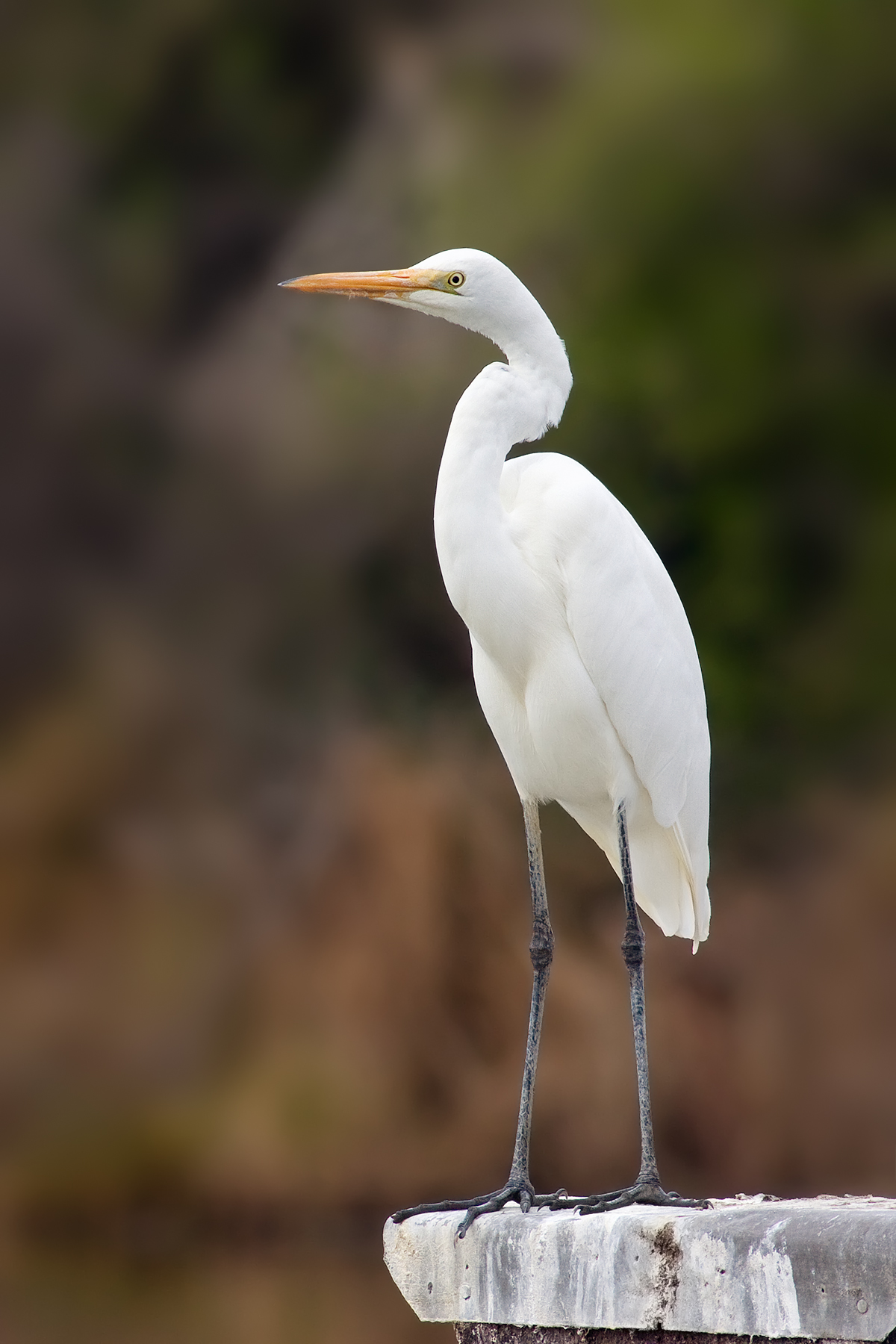
- Eastern great egret (Ardea alba modesta)

Scientific classification
- Kingdom: Animalia
- Phylum: Chordata
- Class: Aves
- Order: Pelecaniformes
- Family: Ardeidae
- Subfamily: Ardeinae

Genera
- 13, see text

= Ardeinae =

Subfamily of herons

Ardeinae is a subfamily of herons, which includes the herons, night herons, and egrets.

== Taxonomy ==
=== Extant Genera ===
Image	Genus	Living species
	Nycticorax T. Forster, 1817 – typical night herons	Black-crowned night heron, Nycticorax nycticorax; Nankeen night heron or rufous night heron, Nycticorax caledonicus; Rodrigues night heron, † Nycticorax megacephalus (extinct); Réunion night heron, † Nycticorax duboisi (extinct); Mauritius night heron, † Nycticorax mauritianus (extinct); Ascension night heron, † Nycticorax olsoni (extinct); Niue night heron, † Nycticorax kalavikai (prehistoric)
	Nyctanassa Stejneger, 1887 – American night herons	Yellow-crowned night heron, Nyctanassa violacea; Bermuda night heron, † Nyctanassa carcinocatactes
	Gorsachius Bonaparte, 1855 – Asian and African night herons	Japanese night heron, Gorsachius goisagi; Malayan night heron, Gorsachius melanolophus
	Butorides Blyth, 1852 – green-backed herons	little heron, Butorides atricapilla; green heron, Butorides virescens; striated heron, Butorides striata; lava heron, Butorides sundevalli
	Agamia Reichenbach, 1853 – Agami heron	Agami heron, Agamia agami
	Pilherodius Reichenbach, 1853 – capped heron	Capped heron, Pilherodius pileatus
	Ardeola F. Boie, 1822 – pond herons	Indian pond heron, Ardeola grayii; Squacco heron, Ardeola ralloides; Chinese pond heron, Ardeola bacchus; Javan pond heron, Ardeola speciosa; Malagasy pond heron, Ardeola idae; Rufous-bellied heron, Ardeola rufiventris
	Bubulcus Bonaparte, 1855 – cattle egrets	Western cattle egret, Bubulcus ibis; Eastern cattle egret, Bubulcus coromandus
	Ardea – typical herons	Great blue heron, Ardea herodias; Grey heron, Ardea cinerea; Goliath heron, Ardea goliath; Cocoi heron, Ardea cocoi; White-necked heron or Pacific heron, Ardea pacifica; Black-headed heron, Ardea melanocephala; Humblot's heron, Ardea humbloti; White-bellied heron, Ardea insignis; Great-billed heron, Ardea sumatrana; Purple heron, Ardea purpurea; Great egret or great white egret, Ardea alba; Intermediate egret, Ardea intermedia
	Syrigma Ridgway, 1878 – Whistling heron	whistling heron, Syrigma sibilatrix
	Calherodius Wagler, 1827 - White-backed night heron	white-backed night heron, Calherodius leuconotus
	Oroanassa Ogilvie-Grant, 1899 - White-eared night heron	white-eared night heron, Oroanassa magnifica
	EgrettaT. Forster, 1817 – typical egrets	Pied heron, Egretta picata; White-faced heron, Egretta novaehollandiae; Reddish egret, Egretta rufescens; Black heron, Egretta ardesiaca; Slaty egret, Egretta vinaceigula; Tricolored heron, Egretta tricolor – also known as Louisiana heron; Little blue heron, Egretta caerulea; Snowy egret, Egretta thula; Little egret, Egretta garzetta; Western reef heron, Egretta gularis; Dimorphic egret, Egretta dimorpha; Pacific reef heron, Egretta sacra – also known as Pacific reef egret or eastern reef heron; Chinese egret, Egretta eulophotes; † Egretta subfluvia, (Late Miocene or Early Pliocene)

=== Fossils ===
- Genus †Proardea (fossil)
- Genus †Zeltornis (fossil, Early Miocene of Djebel Zelten, Libya)
- Genus undetermined
  - †Easter Island heron, Ardeidae gen. et sp. indet. (prehistoric)
