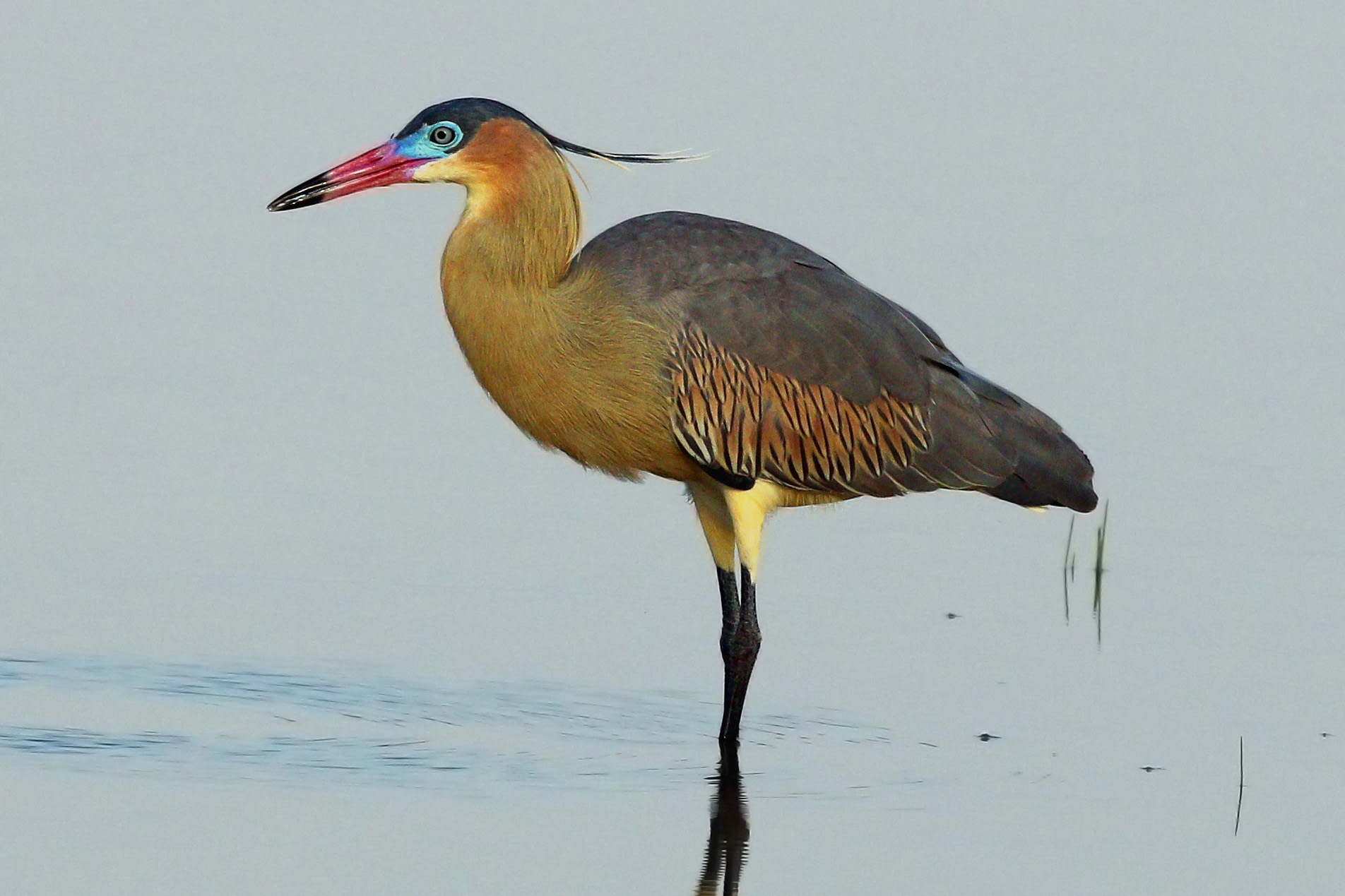
- Adult S. s. sibilatrix The Pantanal, Brazil

Conservation status
- Least Concern (IUCN 3.1)

Scientific classification
- Kingdom: Animalia
- Phylum: Chordata
- Class: Aves
- Order: Pelecaniformes
- Family: Ardeidae
- Subfamily: Ardeinae
- Genus: Syrigma; Ridgway, 1878
- Species: S. sibilatrix

Binomial name
- Syrigma sibilatrix (Temminck, 1824)

Synonyms
- Ardea sibilatrix

= Whistling heron =

Species of bird

The whistling heron (Syrigma sibilatrix) is a medium-sized, often terrestrial heron of South America. It is the only species placed in the genus Syrigma. There are two subspecies, the southern S. s. sibilatrix and the northern S. s. fostersmithi.

== Taxonomy ==
A molecular phylogenetic study published in 2023 found that within the heron family the whistling heron is most closely related to the capped heron (Pilherodius pileatus).

Two subspecies are recognised:

- S. s. fostersmithi Friedmann, 1949 – northeast Colombia and northwest Venezuela
- S. s. sibilatrix (Temminck, 1824) – east Bolivia and south Brazil to northeast Argentina

== Description ==
The whistling heron measures 53 to 64 cm in length and weighs 521 to 546 g. The southern subspecies is bigger but has a shorter bill in proportion to the body.

The overall impression of standing birds is gray, with flying birds showing conspicuous white rear parts (lower back, belly, and tail). In both subspecies, adults' upperparts except the lower back are blue-gray. The feathers of the sides of head, sides of the neck, breast, and scapular area are basically white but are stained gold to buff, perhaps by the powder down typical of herons or by secretions of the preen gland; the color varies from bird to bird. In the nominate subspecies, the crown and crest (separate plumes up to 4 cm long on the nape) are black and the upper wing coverts are cinnamon-colored; the crown and crest are slate-gray and the upper wing coverts are honey-colored (or "chamois") in fostersmithi. The bill is pink with blue to violet at the base and the distal third black, the legs are greenish and rather short, and there is a fairly big area of bare bluish skin around the eye.

Juveniles have the same overall pattern but are duller than adults, with the crown lighter, the breast light gray, and the throat and sides unstained white. Chicks are undescribed.

The bird is named for its most common call, a "loud, flute-like whistled kleeer-er" or "a high, reedy, complaining whistle, often doubled or uttered in a ser[ies], wueeee, wueeee,.…, easily imitated" or "a distinctive, characteristic, far-carrying, melodious whistle" that "can be rendered 'kee, kee, kee.'" It may also give "a slow, drawn-out whistle" when taking off. The alarm call is a harsh quah-h-h.

Unlike other herons, in flight it has fast, duck-like wingbeats and usually does not retract its neck fully.

== Distribution and habitat ==
The subspecies fostersmithi inhabits the Llanos and the Orinoco basin of Colombia and Venezuela. The subspecies sibilatrix inhabits eastern Bolivia, Paraguay, western and southern Brazil, Uruguay, Chile, and northeastern Argentina. Recent records suggest that it may be expanding its range northward and eastward in Brazil. It makes seasonal movements at least in northeastern Venezuela, where it does not occur from November to January, but remains all year in other areas, such as Buenos Aires Province, Argentina.

It occurs at elevations up to 500 m (with a sight record from 2300 m) in seasonally flooded savanna, often in drier grassy situations than other herons, but also in a wide variety of open waterlogged or shallowly submerged terrain. Because it roosts in trees, it particularly likes regions where open areas are mixed with woodlots. It has no objection to human-altered habitats such as pastures and roadsides, and it often perches on fenceposts.

Although patchily distributed, it is common in many areas, with no population considered vulnerable. It benefits from deforestation and some agriculture. As a successful heron of dry tropical country, it has been compared to two species originating in the Old World: the cattle egret and the black-headed heron.

== Behavior ==
=== Feeding ===
This species eats any small dryland and marsh animals it can catch, or even pirate (as from an aplomado falcon in one reported incident). It often holds still but also walks very slowly and may use more active techniques, even running after prey or catching flying insects (notably dragonflies) from a standing position. It may allow humans to approach fairly closely rather than leave a good feeding spot. It typically feeds alone or in pairs, but is sometimes seen in groups up to 100, especially before roosting for the night.

=== Breeding ===
In a courtship display, the birds fly back and forth and glide in circles. A captive pair displayed by raising their plumes.

This species nests alone, unlike most herons, which nest in colonies. It may nest in mature trees such as araucarias or exotic trees. One nest in Argentina was loosely built of sticks about 4m up in a eucalyptus. The eggs are pale blue and speckled, about 4.7 × 3.6 cm, and the normal clutch is three or four. Incubation lasts about 28 days, and young fledge 42 days after hatching. Egg survival has been measured at 28% and nestling survival at 40%; storms that destroy nests are an important cause of losses. Based on observations of family groups, only two young normally fledge. Unlike most heron species, whistling herons care for young after leaving the nest; juveniles beg for food by hissing with their wings drooped.

== Cultural significance ==
Indigenous peoples formerly used its neck plumes as trade items, though not so heavily as to reduce populations.
