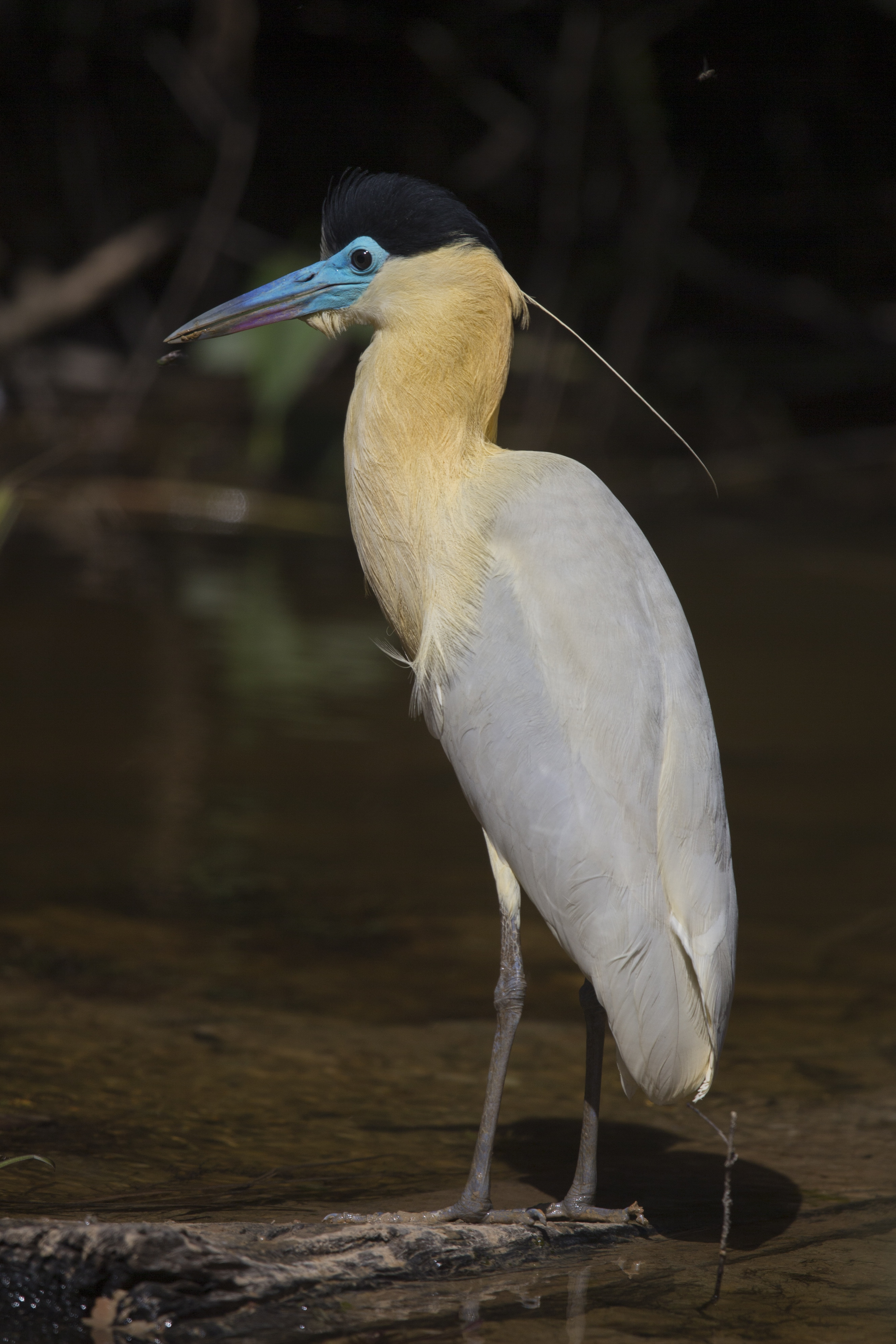

Conservation status
- Least Concern (IUCN 3.1)

Scientific classification
- Kingdom: Animalia
- Phylum: Chordata
- Class: Aves
- Order: Pelecaniformes
- Family: Ardeidae
- Subfamily: Ardeinae
- Genus: Pilherodius; Reichenbach, 1853
- Species: P. pileatus

Binomial name
- Pilherodius pileatus (Boddaert, 1783)

= Capped heron =

Species of bird

The capped heron (Pilherodius pileatus) is a water bird endemic to the neotropics, inhabiting rainforest from the center of Panama to the south of Brazil. It is the only species of the genus Pilherodius, and one of the least known of the heron family, Ardeidae. It is superficially similar to the group of the night herons, but is active during daytime or at twilight.

== Taxonomy ==
The capped heron was described by the French polymath Georges-Louis Leclerc, Comte de Buffon in 1780 in his Histoire Naturelle des Oiseaux from a specimen collected in Cayenne, French Guiana. The bird was also illustrated in a hand-coloured plate engraved by François-Nicolas Martinet in the Planches Enluminées D'Histoire Naturelle which was produced under the supervision of Edme-Louis Daubenton to accompany Buffon's text. Neither the plate caption nor Buffon's description included a scientific name but in 1783 the Dutch naturalist Pieter Boddaert coined the binomial name Ardea pileata in his catalogue of the Planches Enluminées. The capped heron is now the only species placed in the genus Pilherodius that was erected by the German naturalist Ludwig Reichenbach in 1853. The genus name combines the Ancient Greek πιλος pilos "cap" and ερωδιος erōdios meaning "heron". The specific epithet pileatus is Latin for "capped".

A molecular phylogenetic study published in 2023 found that the capped heron is sister to the whistling heron (Syrigma sibilatrix).

== Distribution and habitat ==
The capped heron is endemic to the neotropics and almost exclusive to rainforest. It is present in Bolivia, Brazil, Colombia, Ecuador, French Guiana, Panama, Paraguay, Peru, Suriname, and Venezuela. It inhabits low lands up to 900 m above sea level, though in Venezuela it is only found below 500 m, and in Ecuador below 400 m. Although there are no migrations registered to this species and it is believed that is sedentary, there may be seasonal movements in Darien, Panama.

It normally inhabits swamps and ditches in wet grasslands or rainforests. Sometimes it can venture into deeper ponds and rivers. It prefers to forage on the shore or in floating vegetation, but has also been observed in trenches of coffee plantations and flooded rice fields.

== Description ==
In the Pantanal, Brazil

This species is very distinct from other herons, being the only one with a blue beak and face, and a black crown. The belly, chest, and neck are covered with yellowish-white or light-cream feathers. The wings and back are covered with white feathers. Three to four white long feathers extend from the black crown. No sexual dimorphism in color or brightness has been noted.

The body length of an adult varies between 510 and 590 mm, the wing chords between 263 and 280 mm, the tail between 95 and 103 mm, and the tarsus between 92 and 99 mm. The weight of an adult varies between 444 and 632 g.

The juveniles are very similar to the adults. They only differ in body length and that the white feathers are slightly grey.

== Behaviour ==
=== Food and feeding ===
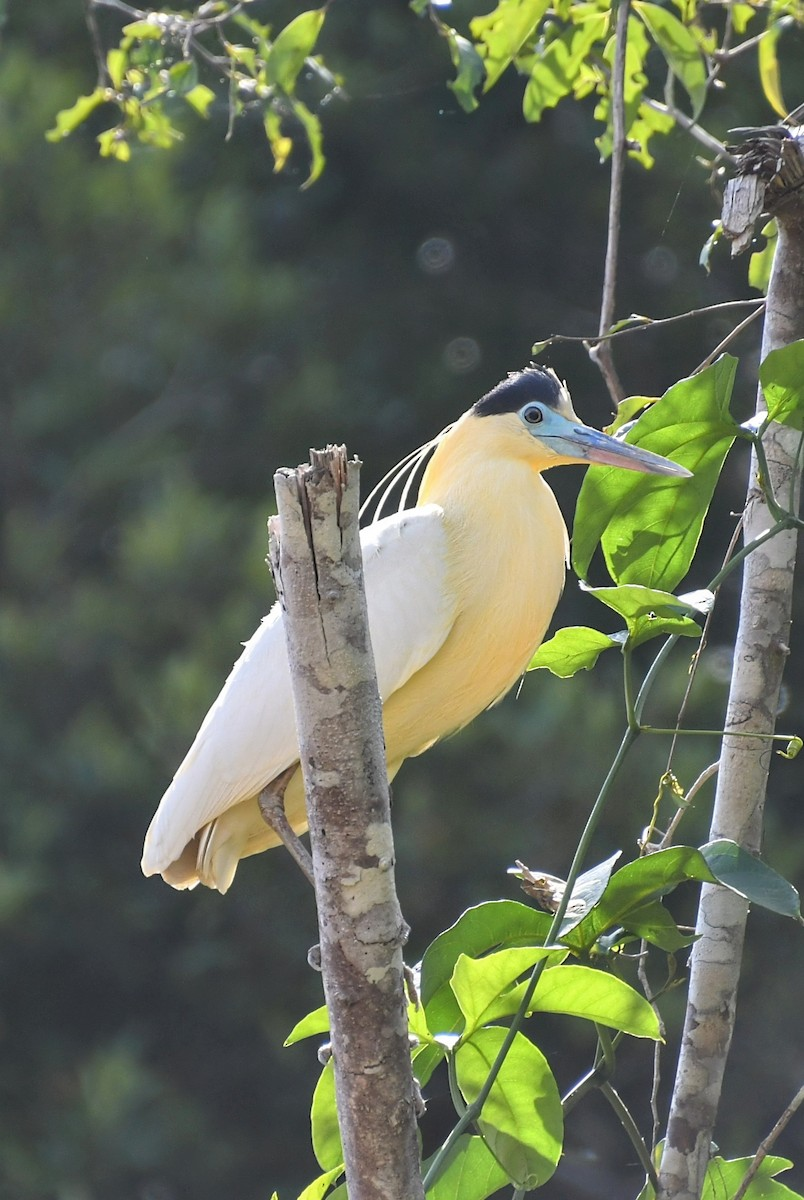
At Río Amacayacu, Amazonas, Colombia

Capped herons hunt mainly for fish, but also aquatic insects and larvae, tadpoles, and frogs. Fish taken as prey tend to be between 1 and 5 cm long. The insects are hunted in the nearby vegetation along the river or pond, and the fish in the shallow waters.

In a typical hunting sequence the heron will stand erectly searching for potential prey; after locating it they will crouch slowly and extend their neck; finally they will introduce their beak into the water at a great speed to catch the prey. The frequency of success observed is 23%. They can also use the same sequence while walking in the shallows. They usually walk slowly, covering the same area repeatedly pausing for a few seconds, then slowly moving one foot to take a new step. There are reports of individuals doing aerial hunting, peaking, gleaning, foot paddling, dipping, swimming feeding, and bill-vibrating.

Capped herons move frequently between feeding sites, sometimes flying up to 100m. They may be crepuscular, but have been observed foraging during broad daylight, unlike the night-herons. They usually hunt solitarily.

=== Breeding ===
There is very little known about the reproduction of this species. Captive breeding in Miami, USA indicates that a female may lay 2-4 dull white eggs, incubation lasts 26–27 days, and that the chick has white down. However, these captive individuals failed to have any young survive, possibly due to a deficient diet or abnormal behavior in the adults. Based on birds with a similar biology, it is likely that they maintain family groups and care for young even after the young have reached the fledgling stage. There may be a two-cycle breeding pattern, with northern and southern populations breeding at different times of the year.

=== Territoriality ===
Capped herons are strongly territorial; the same bird may be seen at a foraging site for weeks at a time. One capped heron was seen chasing another away from a foraging site, until the other bird settled high in a tree.

=== Interspecific and intraspecific behaviour ===
The capped heron is normally solitary, although there are cases where they have been found in couples or groups. Birds may be seen with other species such as snowy egrets (Egretta thula) and scarlet ibis (Eudocimus ruber), however other studies have found that they avoid large mixed-species flocks, appearing in fewer than 1% of 145 observed feeding aggregations. Capped herons appear to be submissive to great egrets (Ardea alba), but dominant to snowy egrets (Egretta thula) and striated herons (Butorides striatus).

== Conservation ==
This species has an extremely large range, and hence does not approach the thresholds for a Vulnerable rating under the range-size criterion. The population size has not been quantified, and the trend is not known, but it is not believed to approach the thresholds for Vulnerable under the population size or trend criteria. For these reasons the species is evaluated as Least Concern. Nevertheless, it occurs in very low densities and is considered "rare" in Ecuador, Colombia, Venezuela, and Panama.

The capped heron appears to be adaptable and may be expanding its use of man-made habitats. People have found some individuals in pools along the Transamazonian Highway Brasil. However, given that it is mainly a riverine forest species, the loss of this habitat due to logging and conversion of forest to pasture might pose long-term threats.
