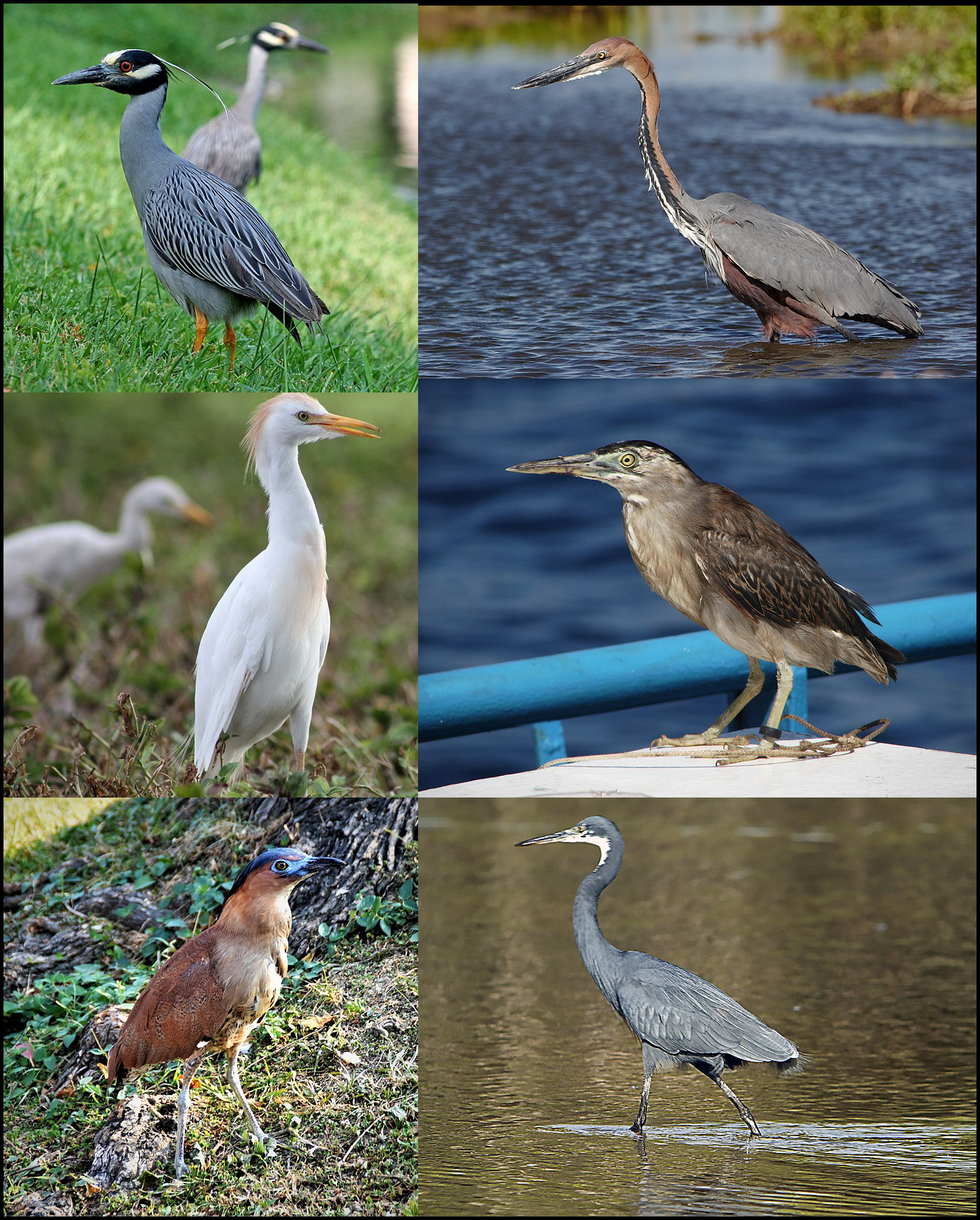

Scientific classification
- Kingdom: Animalia
- Phylum: Chordata
- Class: Aves
- Order: Pelecaniformes
- Suborder: Ardei
- Family: Ardeidae; Leach, 1820

Type genus
- Ardea Linnaeus, 1758

Genera
- 18 extant, see text

Synonyms
- Cochlearidae

= Heron =

Herons Temporal range: Early Oligocene–Holocene 32–0 Ma

Family of birds

Herons are long-legged, long-necked, freshwater and coastal birds in the family Ardeidae, with 75 recognised species, some of which are referred to as egrets or bitterns rather than herons. Members of the genus Botaurus are referred to as bitterns, and, together with the zigzag heron, or zigzag bittern, in the monotypic genus Zebrilus, form a monophyletic group, Botaurinae, within the Ardeidae family. Egrets do not form a biologically distinct group from herons, and tend to be named differently because they are mainly white or have decorative plumes in breeding plumage. Herons, by evolutionary adaptation, have long beaks.

The classification of individual heron and egret species is fraught with difficulty, and no clear consensus exists about the correct placement of many species into either of the two major genera, Ardea and Egretta. Similarly, the relationships of the genera in the family are not completely resolved. However, one species formerly considered to constitute a separate monotypic family, the Cochlearidae or the boat-billed heron, is now regarded as a member of the Ardeidae.

Although herons resemble birds in some other families, such as the storks, ibises, spoonbills, and cranes, they differ from these in flying with their necks retracted, not outstretched. They are also one of the bird groups that have powder down. Some members of this group nest colonially in trees, while others, notably the bitterns, use reed beds.

== Name ==
The word heron first appeared in the English language around 1300, originating from Old French hairon, eron (12th century), earlier hairo (11th century), from Frankish haigiro or from Proto-Germanic *haigrô, *hraigrô.

Herons are also known as shitepokes (/ˈʃaɪtpoʊk/ SHYTE-pohk), or euphemistically as shikepokes or shypokes. Webster's Dictionary suggests that herons were given this name because of their habit of defecating when flushed.

The 1971 Compact Edition of the Oxford English Dictionary describes the use of shitepoke for the small green heron of North America (Butorides virescens) as originating in the United States, citing a published example from 1853. The OED also observes that shiterow or shederow are terms used for herons, and also applied as derogatory terms meaning a thin, weakly person. This name for a heron is found in a list of game birds in a royal decree of James VI (1566–1625) of Scotland. The OED speculates that shiterow is a corruption of shiteheron.

Another former name was heronshaw or hernshaw, derived from the Old French heronçeau. Corrupted to handsaw, this name appears in Shakespeare's Hamlet. A possible further corruption took place in the Norfolk Broads, where the heron is often referred to as a harnser.

A group of herons has been called a "siege".

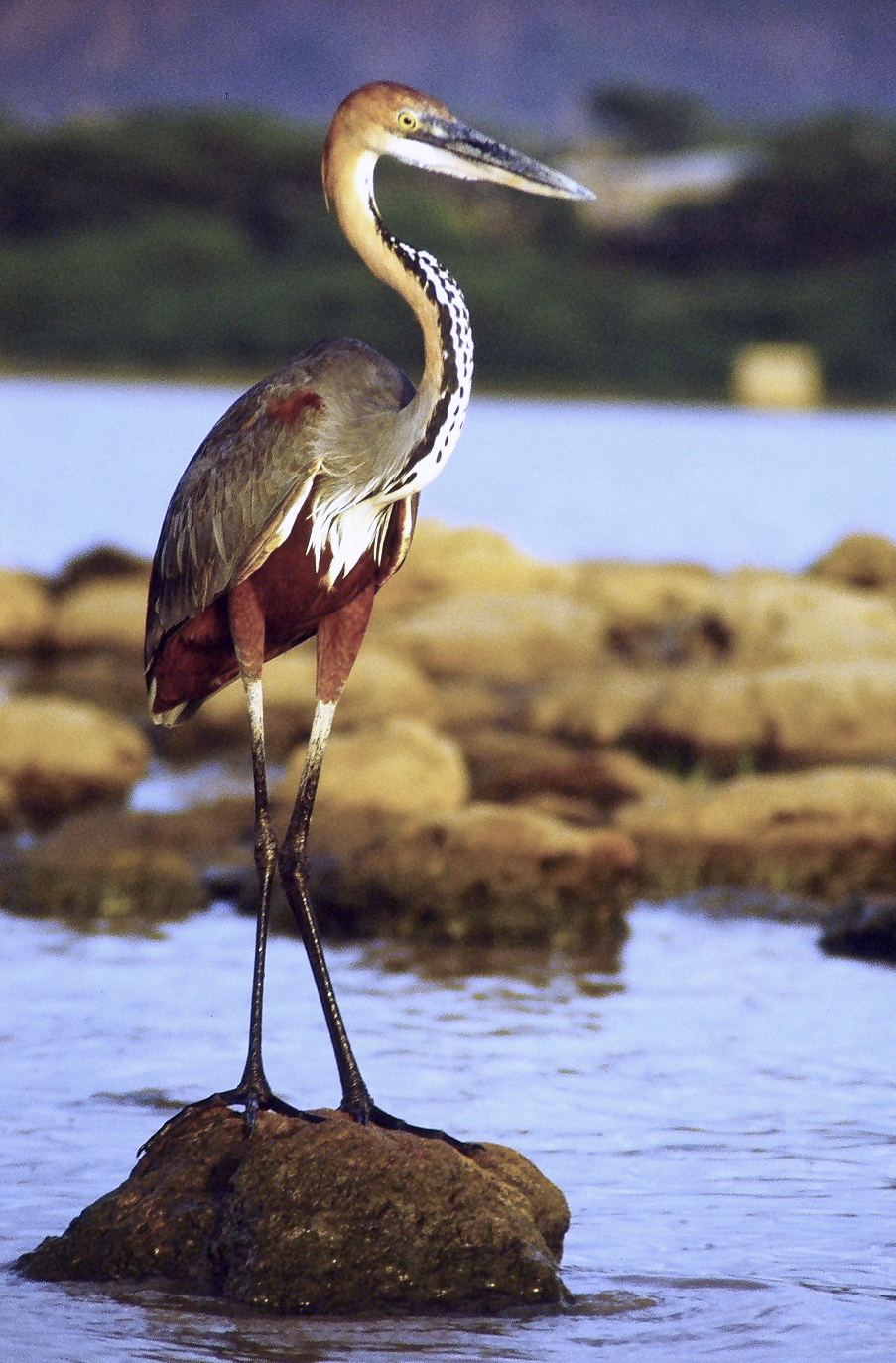
The goliath heron is the largest heron species.

== Description ==
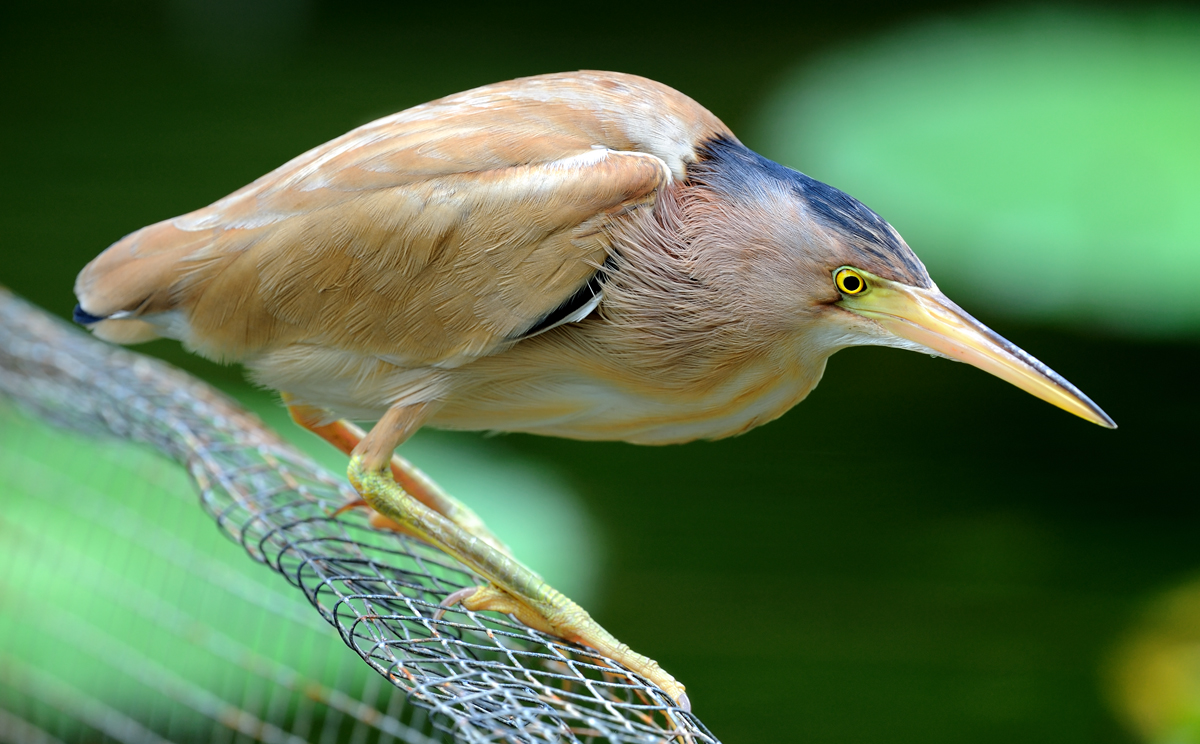
Yellow bittern with its neck fully retracted.

The herons are medium- to large-sized birds with long legs and necks. They exhibit very little sexual dimorphism in size. The smallest species is usually considered the dwarf bittern, which measures 25–30 cm (10–12 in) in length, although all the species in the genus Ixobrychus are small and many broadly overlap in size. The largest species of heron is the goliath heron, which stands up to 152 cm (60 in) tall.

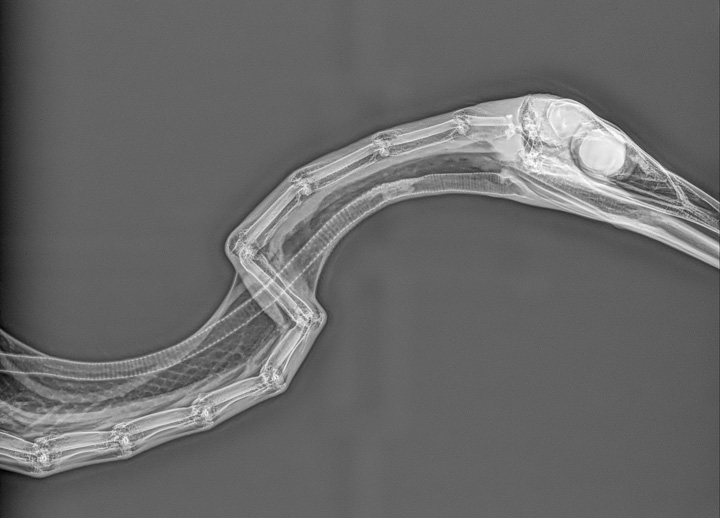
X-ray of the cervical vertebrae in the neck of an unidentified heron

All herons can retract their necks by folding them into a tight S-shape, due to the modified shape of the cervical vertebrae, of which they have 20 or 21; the neck is retracted during flight, unlike most other long-necked birds. The neck is longer in the day herons than the night herons and bitterns. The legs are long and strong, and in almost every species are unfeathered from the lower part of the tibia (the exception is the zigzag heron). In flight, the legs and feet are generally held in a horizontal position, pointing backwards. Toes are long and thin, with three pointing forwards and one backwards.

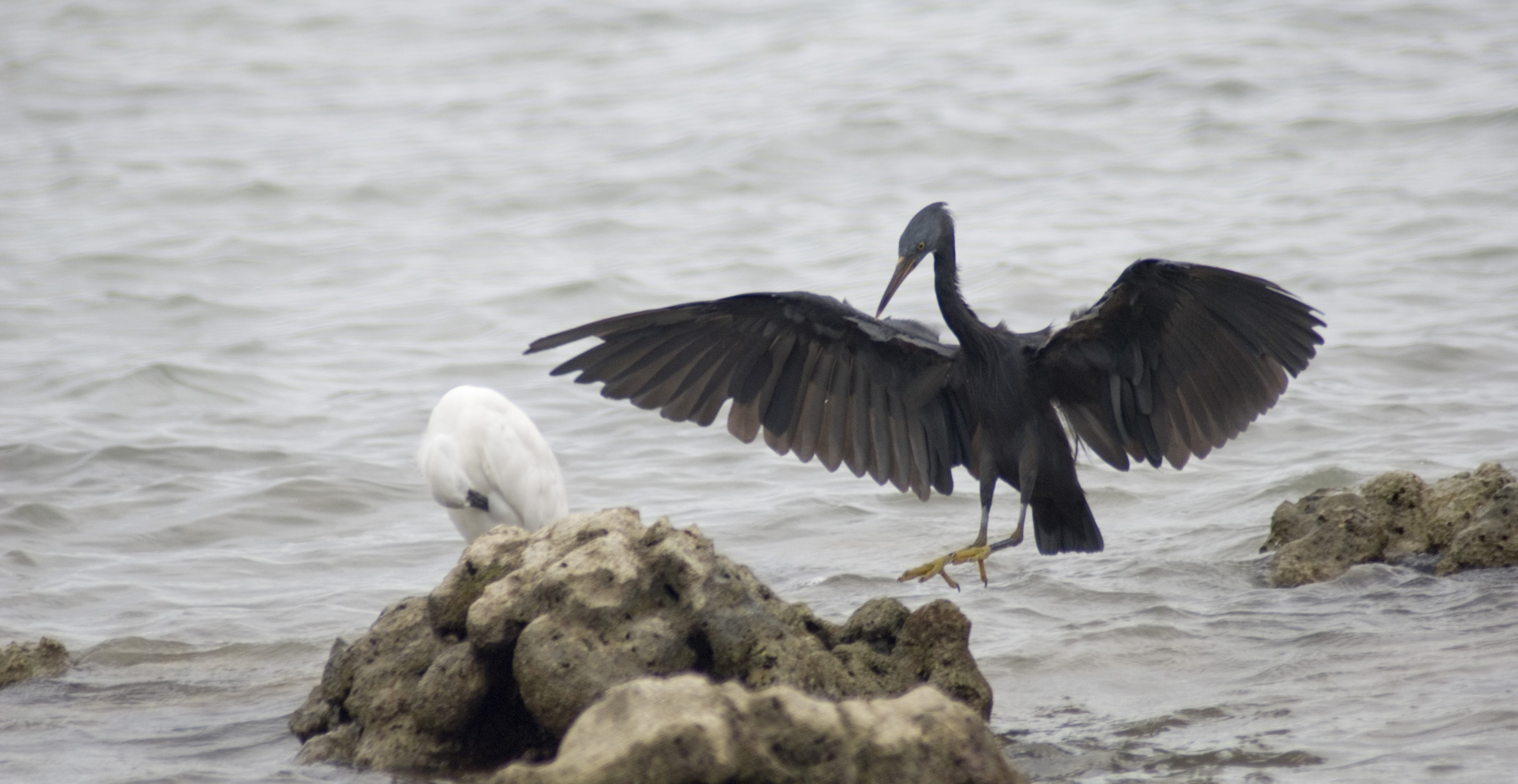
The Pacific reef heron has two colour morphs, the light and the dark.

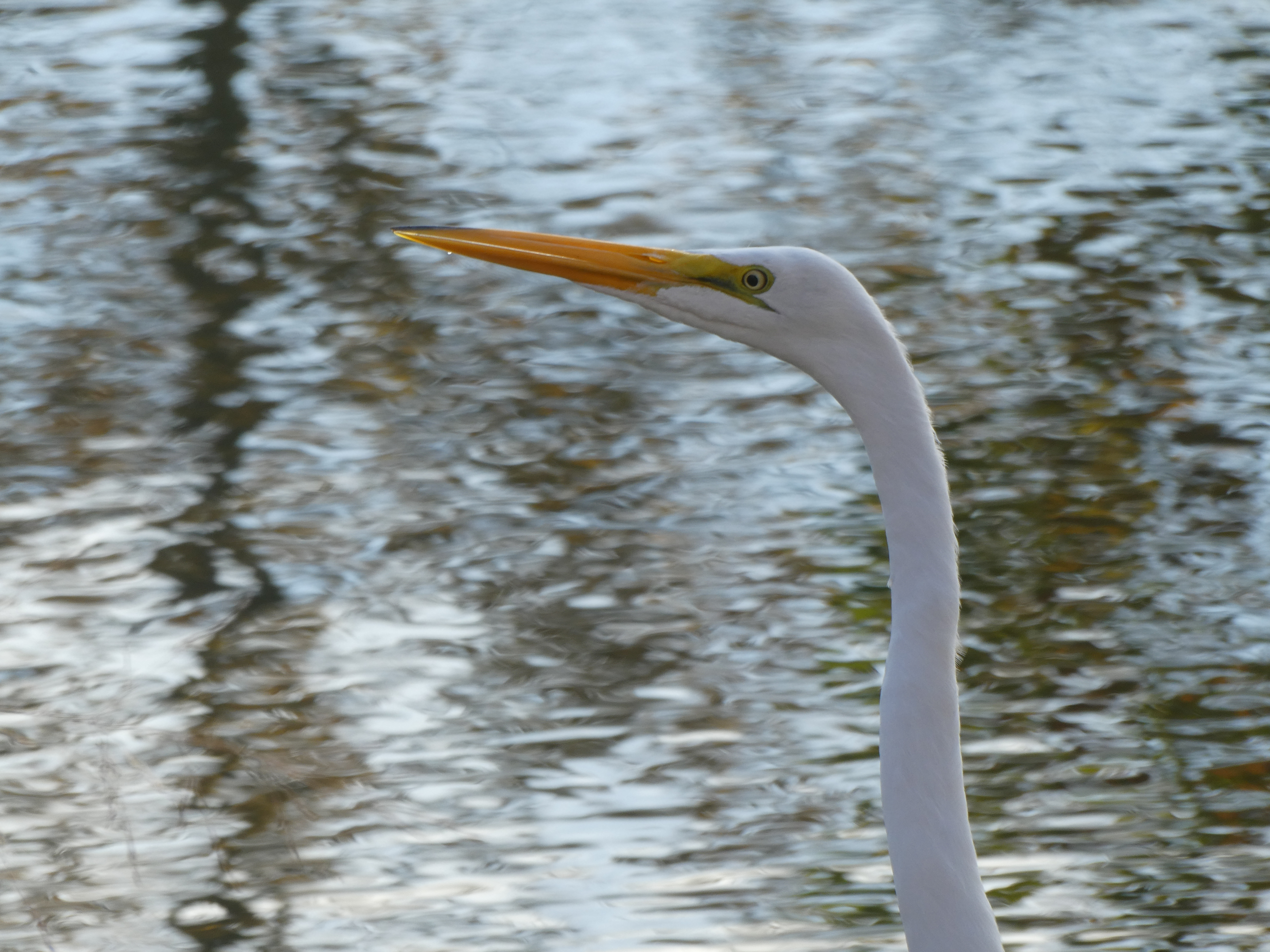
A white heron with a droplet of water on its beak in Forest Park.

The bill is generally long and harpoon-like. It can vary from extremely narrow, as in the agami heron, to wider as in the grey heron. The most atypical heron bill is owned by the boat-billed heron, which has a broad, thick bill. Herons' bills and other bare parts of the body are usually yellow, black, or brown, although this can vary during the breeding season. The wings are broad and long, exhibiting 10 or 11 primary feathers (the boat-billed heron has only nine), 15–20 secondaries, and 12 rectrices (10 in the bitterns). The feathers of the herons are soft and the plumage is usually blue, black, brown, grey, or white, and can often be strikingly complex. Amongst the day herons, little sexual dimorphism in plumage is seen (except in the pond herons); however, for the night herons and smaller bitterns, plumage differences between the sexes are the rule. Many species also have different colour morphs. In the Pacific reef heron, both dark and light colour morphs exist, and the percentage of each morph varies geographically; its white morphs only occur in areas with coral beaches.

== Distribution and habitat ==
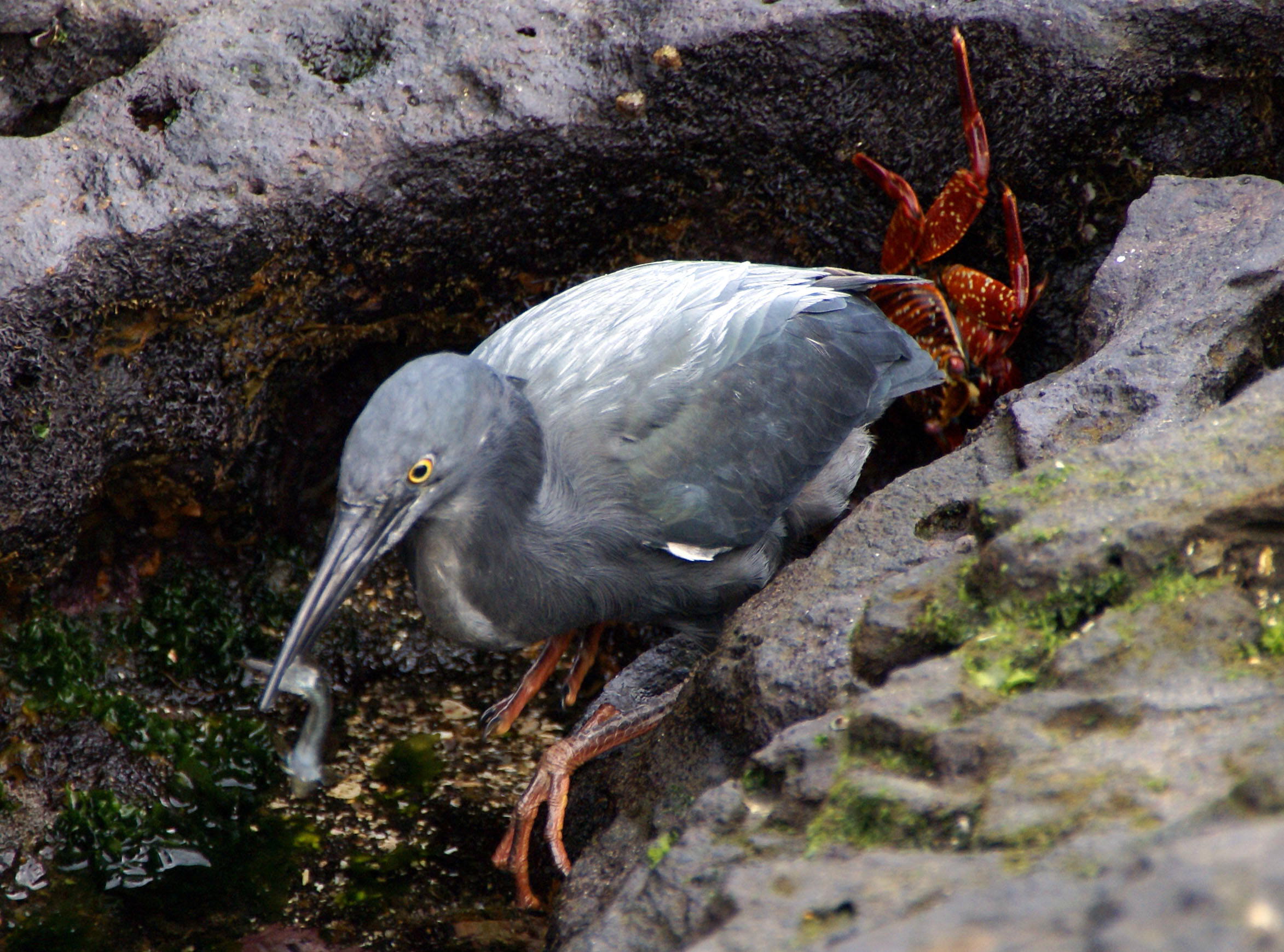
Lava herons are endemic to the Galápagos Islands, where they feed on fish and crabs in the intertidal and mangrove areas.

The herons are a widespread family with a cosmopolitan distribution. They exist on all continents except Antarctica and are present in most habitats except the coldest extremes of the Arctic, extremely high mountains, and the driest deserts. Almost all species are associated with water; they are essentially non-swimming waterbirds that feed on the margins of lakes, rivers, swamps, ponds, and the sea. They are predominantly found in lowland areas, although some species live in alpine areas, and the majority of species occur in the tropics.

The herons are a highly mobile family, with most species being at least partially migratory; for example, the grey heron is mostly sedentary in Britain, but mostly migratory in Scandinavia. Birds are particularly inclined to disperse widely after breeding, but before the annual migration, where the species is colonial, searching out new feeding areas and reducing the pressures on feeding grounds near the colony. The migration typically occurs at night, usually as individuals or in small groups.

== Behaviour and ecology ==
=== Diet ===
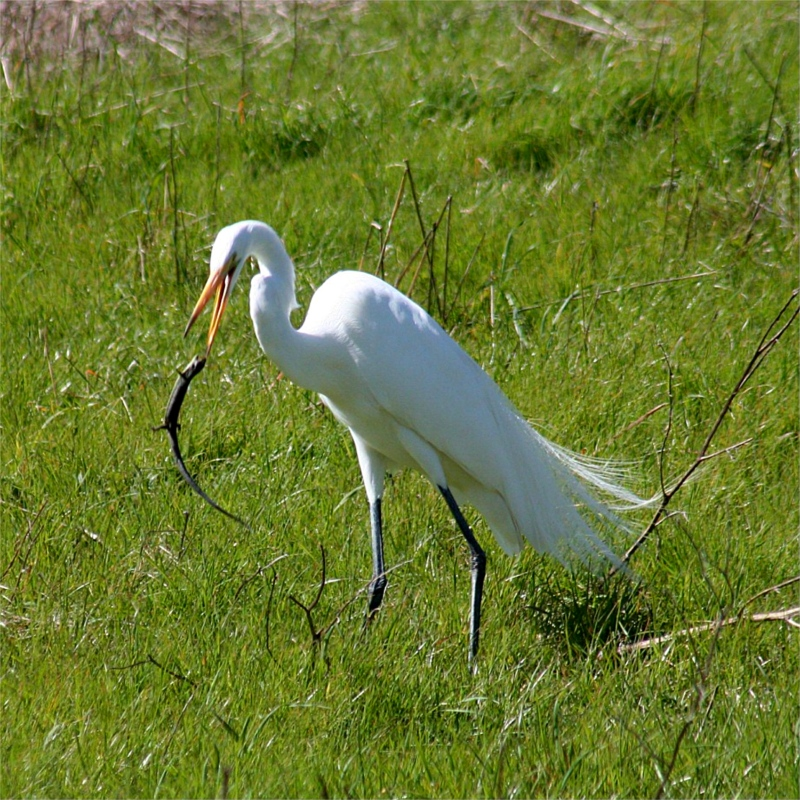
A great egret manipulating its prey, a lizard, before swallowing

Herons, egrets, and bitterns are carnivorous. The members of this family are mostly associated with wetlands and water and feed on a variety of live aquatic prey. Their diet includes a wide variety of aquatic animals, including fish, reptiles, amphibians, crustaceans, molluscs, and aquatic insects. Individual species may be generalists or specialize in certain prey types, such as the yellow-crowned night heron, which specializes in crustaceans, particularly crabs. Many species also opportunistically take larger prey, including birds and bird eggs, rodents, and more rarely carrion. Even more rarely, herons eating acorns, peas, and grains have been reported, but most vegetable matter consumed is accidental.

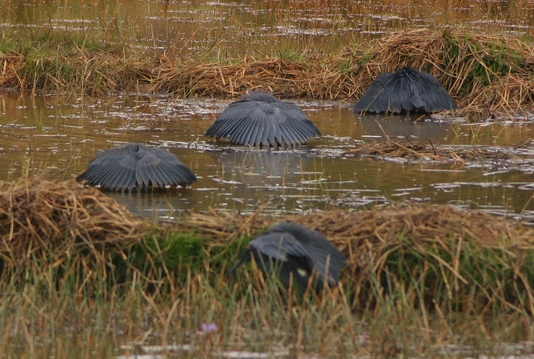
Black herons holding wings out to form an umbrella-like canopy under which to hunt

The most common hunting technique is for the bird to sit motionless on the edge or stand in shallow water and wait until prey comes within range. Birds may either do this from an upright posture, giving them a wider field of view for seeing prey, or from a crouched position, which is more cryptic and means the bill is closer to the prey when it is located. Having seen prey, the head is moved from side to side so that the heron can calculate the position of the prey in the water and compensate for refraction, and then the bill is used to spear the prey.

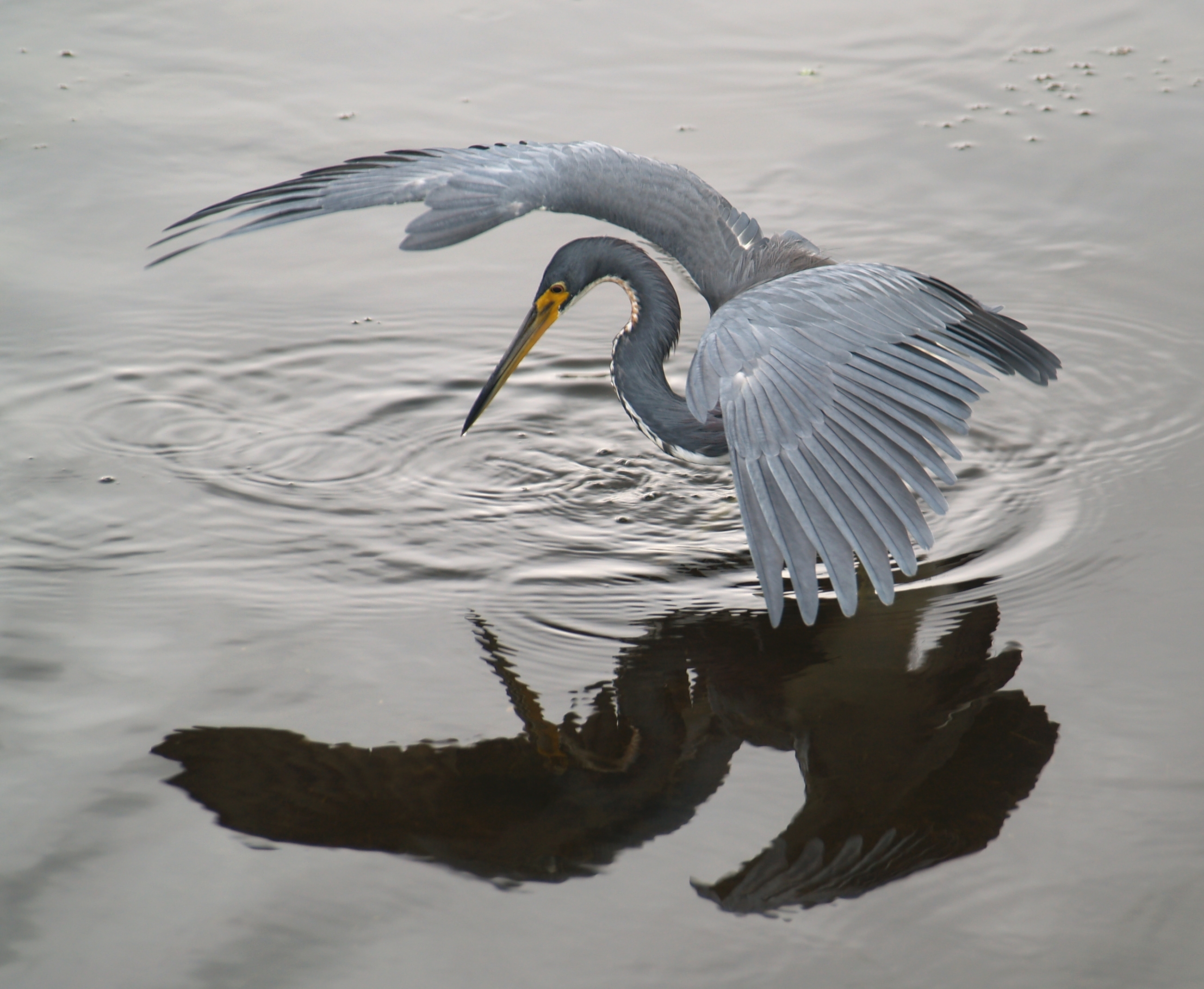
Tricoloured heron fishing, using wings to eliminate reflection from the water, which improves its ability to sight prey

In addition to sitting and waiting, herons may feed more actively. They may walk slowly, around or less than 60 paces a minute, snatching prey when it is observed. Other active feeding behaviour includes foot stirring and probing, where the feet are used to flush out hidden prey. The wings may be used to frighten prey (or possibly attract it to shade) or to reduce glare; the most extreme example of this is exhibited by the black heron, which forms a full canopy with its wings over its body.

Some species of heron, such as the little egret and grey heron, have been documented using bait to lure prey to within striking distance. Herons may use items already in place, or actively add items to the water to attract fish such as the banded killifish. Items used may be man-made, such as bread; alternatively, striated herons in the Amazon have been watched repeatedly dropping seeds, insects, flowers, and leaves into the water to catch fish.

Three species, the black-headed heron, whistling heron, and especially the two cattle egret species, are less tied to watery environments and may feed far away from water. Cattle egrets improve their foraging success by following large grazing animals, and catching insects flushed by their movement. One study found that the success rate of prey capture increased 3.6 times over solitary foraging.

=== Breeding ===
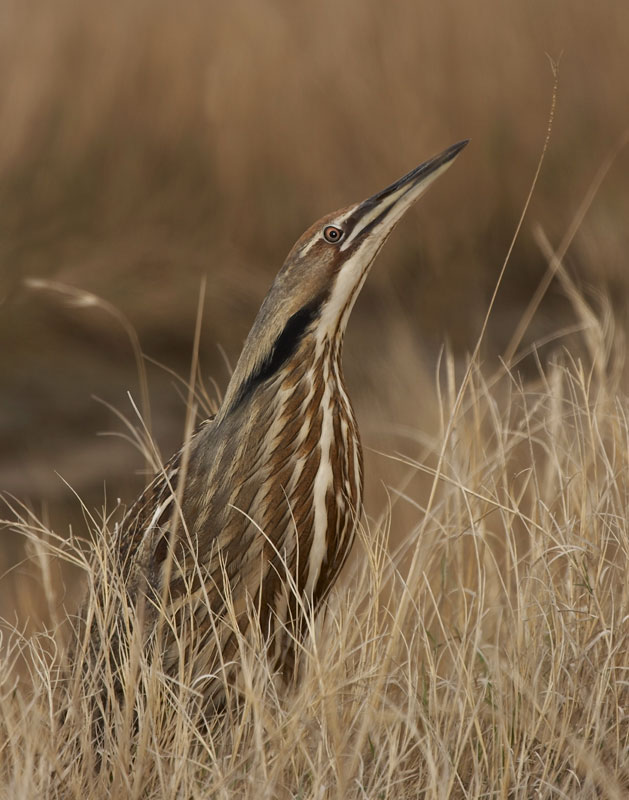
The larger bitterns, like this American bittern, are solitary breeders. To advertise for mates, males use loud, characteristic calls, referred to as booming.

While the family exhibits a range of breeding strategies, overall, the herons are monogamous and mostly colonial. Most day herons and night herons are colonial, or partly colonial depending on circumstances, whereas the bitterns and tiger herons are mostly solitary nesters. Colonies may contain several species, as well as other species of waterbirds. In a study of little egrets and cattle egrets in India, the majority of the colonies surveyed contained both species. Nesting is seasonal in temperate species; in tropical species, it may be seasonal (often coinciding with the rainy season) or year-round. Even in year-round breeders, nesting intensity varies throughout the year. Tropical herons typically have only one breeding season per year, unlike some other tropical birds which may raise up to three broods a year.

Courtship usually takes part in the nest.

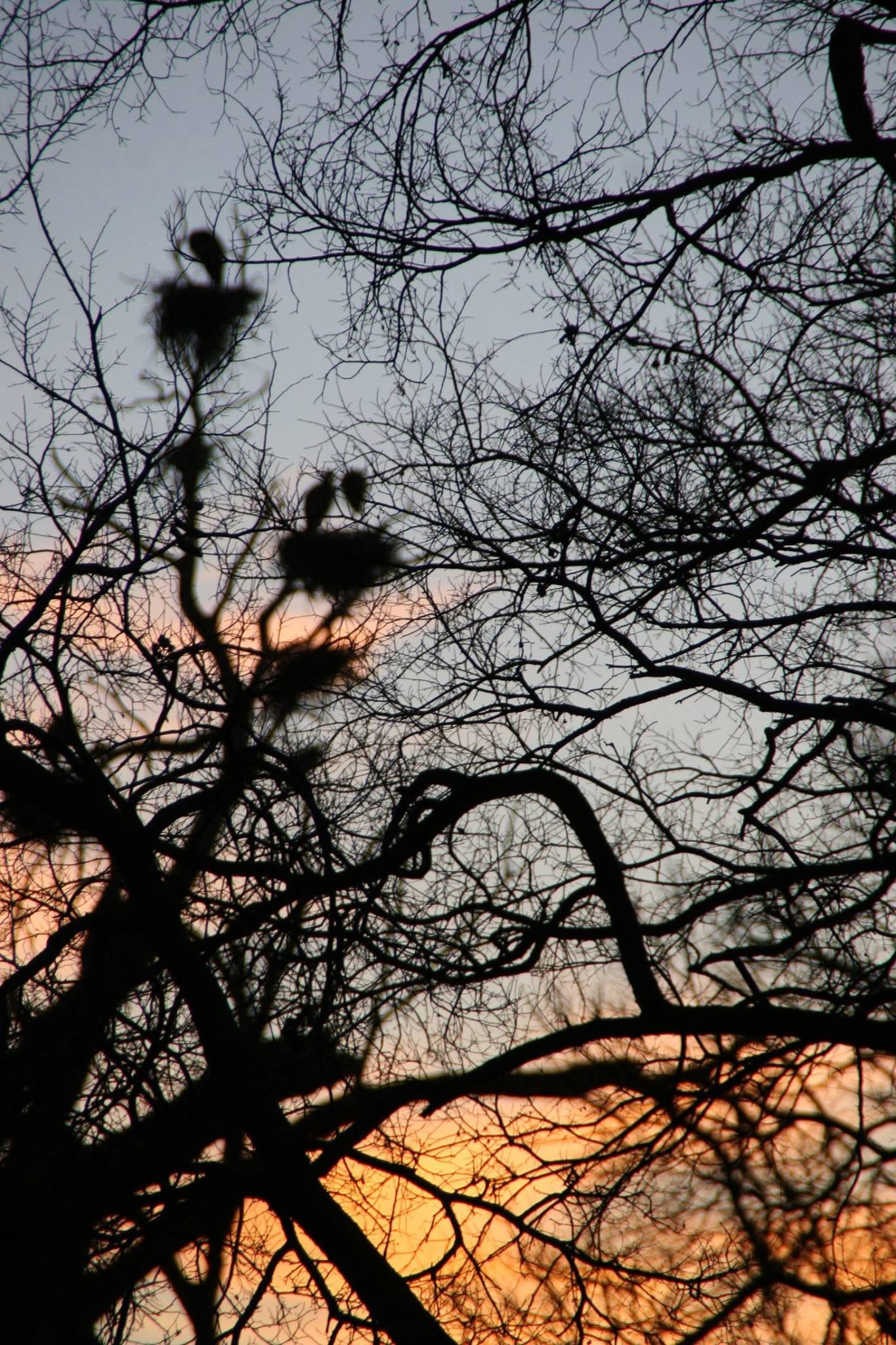
Herons in their nests in tree tops

Males arrive first and begin the building of the nest, where they display to attract females. During courtship, the male employs a stretch display and uses erectile neck feathers; the neck area may swell. The female risks an aggressive attack if she approaches too soon and may have to wait up to four days. In colonial species, displays involve visual cues, which can include adopting postures or ritual displays, whereas in solitary species, auditory cues, such as the deep booming of the bitterns, are important. The exception to this is the boat-billed heron, which pairs up away from the nesting site. Having paired, they continue to build the nest in almost all species, although in the little bittern and least bittern, only the male works on the nest.

Some ornithologists have reported observing female herons attaching themselves to impotent mates, then seeking sexual gratification elsewhere.

The nests of herons are usually found near or above water. Although the nests of a few species have been found on the ground where suitable trees or shrubs are unavailable, they are typically placed in vegetation. Trees are used by many species, and here they may be placed high up from the ground, whereas species living in reed beds may nest very close to the ground. Though the majority of nesting of herons is seen in or immediately around water, colonies commonly occur in several cities when human persecution is absent.

Generally, herons lay between three and seven eggs. Larger clutches are reported in the smaller bitterns and more rarely some of the larger day herons, and single-egg clutches are reported for some of the tiger herons. Clutch size varies by latitude within species, with individuals in temperate climates laying more eggs than tropical ones. On the whole, the eggs are glossy blue or white, with the exception being the large bitterns, which lay olive-brown eggs.

== Taxonomy and systematics ==
Analyses of skeletons, mainly skulls, suggested that the Ardeidae could be split into a diurnal and a crepuscular/nocturnal group which included the bitterns. From DNA studies, and from skeletal analyses that focussed more on bones of the body and limbs, that two-group division has been revealed to be incorrect. Rather, the similarities in the skull morphology among certain herons reflect convergent evolution to cope with the different challenges of daytime and nighttime feeding. Today, it is believed that three major groups can be distinguished, which are:

- tiger herons and the boatbill
- bitterns
- day herons and egrets, and night herons

The night herons may still warrant separation from the day herons and egrets (as subfamily Nycticoracinae, as it was traditionally done). However, the position of some genera (e.g. Butorides or Syrigma) is unclear at the moment, and molecular studies have so far suffered from studying only a small number of taxa. Especially among the subfamily Ardeinae, the relationships are very inadequately resolved. The arrangement presented here should be considered provisional.

A 2008 study suggests that this family belongs to the Pelecaniformes. In response to these findings, the International Ornithological Congress reclassified Ardeidae and their sister taxa Threskiornithidae under the order Pelecaniformes instead of the previous order of Ciconiiformes.

The cladogram shown below is based on a molecular phylogenetic study of the Ardeidae by Jack Hruska and collaborators published in 2023. For several species these results conflict with the taxonomy published online in July 2023 by Frank Gill, Pamela Rasmussen and David Donsker on behalf of the International Ornithological Committee (IOC). The least bittern (Ixobrychus exilis) and the stripe-backed bittern (Ixobrychus involucris) were nested with members of the genus Botaurus. Hruska and collaborators resurrected the genus Calherodius Peters, 1931 to contain two night herons (the white-backed night heron and the white-eared night heron) that were previously placed in Gorsachius. The western cattle egret (Bubulcus ibis) was embedded in the genus Ardea. The eastern cattle egret (Bubulcus coromandus) was not sampled. The placement of the forest bittern (Zonerodius heliosylus) was ambiguous, but the results suggest that it is probably closely related to members of the genus Ardeola rather than to the subfamily Tigriornithinae.

- Ardeidae
  - Tigriornithinae
    - Tigriornis – white-crested tiger heron
    - Tigrisoma – tiger herons (3 species)
  - - Cochleariinae
      Cochlearius – boat-billed heron
    - - Agamiinae
        Agamia – agami heron
      - - Botaurinae
          - Zebrilus – zigzag heron
          - Botaurus – bitterns (14 species of which 1 extinct, includes species formerly placed in Ixobrychus)
        - Ardeinae
          - Gorsachius – night herons (2 species)
          - - - - Calherodius – white-backed night heron
                - Oroanassa – white-eared night heron
              - - - Pilherodius – capped heron
                  - Syrigma – whistling heron
                - Egretta – herons and egrets (13 species)
            - - - Nyctanassa – night herons (2 species of which 1 extinct)
                - Nycticorax – night herons (2 species)
              - - - Butorides – herons (4 species)
                  - Ardeola – pond herons (6 species)
                - Ardea – herons and egrets (16 species, including cattle egrets)

As of August 2024 the IOC lists 75 heron species, divided into 18 genera.

- Subfamily Tigriornithinae
  - Genus Taphophoyx (fossil, Late Miocene of Levy County, Florida)
  - Genus Tigrisoma – typical tiger herons (three species)
  - Genus Tigriornis – white-crested tiger heron
- Subfamily Cochleariinae
  - Genus Cochlearius – boat-billed heron
- Subfamily Agamiinae
  - Genus Agamia – Agami heron
- Subfamily Botaurinae
  - Genus Zebrilus – zigzag heron
  - Genus Botaurus – bitterns (14 species, one recently extinct. Includes species formerly placed in Ixobrychus)
  - Genus Pikaihao – Saint Bathan's bittern (fossil, Early Miocene of Otago, New Zealand)
- Subfamily Ardeinae
  - Genus Zeltornis (fossil, Early Miocene of Djebel Zelten, Libya)
  - Genus Nycticorax – typical night herons (two living species, four recently extinct; sometimes includes Nyctanassa)
  - Genus Nyctanassa – American night herons (one living species, one recently extinct)
  - Genus Gorsachius – Asian and African night herons (four species)
  - Genus Butorides – green-backed herons (four species; sometimes included in Ardea)
  - Genus Pilherodius – capped heron
  - Genus Zonerodius – forest bittern
  - Genus Ardeola – pond herons (six species)
  - Genus Bubulcus – cattle egrets (one or two species, sometimes included in Ardea)
  - Genus Proardea (fossil)
  - Genus Ardea – typical herons (16 species)
  - Genus Syrigma – whistling heron
  - Genus Egretta – typical egrets (7–13 species)
  - Genus undetermined
    - Easter Island heron, Ardeidae gen. et sp. indet. (prehistoric)

Fossil herons of unresolved affiliations

- "Anas" basaltica (Late Oligocene of Varnsdorf, Czech Republic)
- Ardeagradis
- Proardeola – possibly same as Proardea
- Matuku (Early Miocene of Otago, New Zealand)

Other prehistoric and fossil species are included in the respective genus accounts. In addition, Proherodius is a disputed fossil which was variously considered a heron or one of the extinct long-legged waterfowl, the Presbyornithidae. It is only known from a sternum; a tarsometatarsus that had been assigned to it actually belongs to the paleognath Lithornis vulturinus.

== Gallery ==
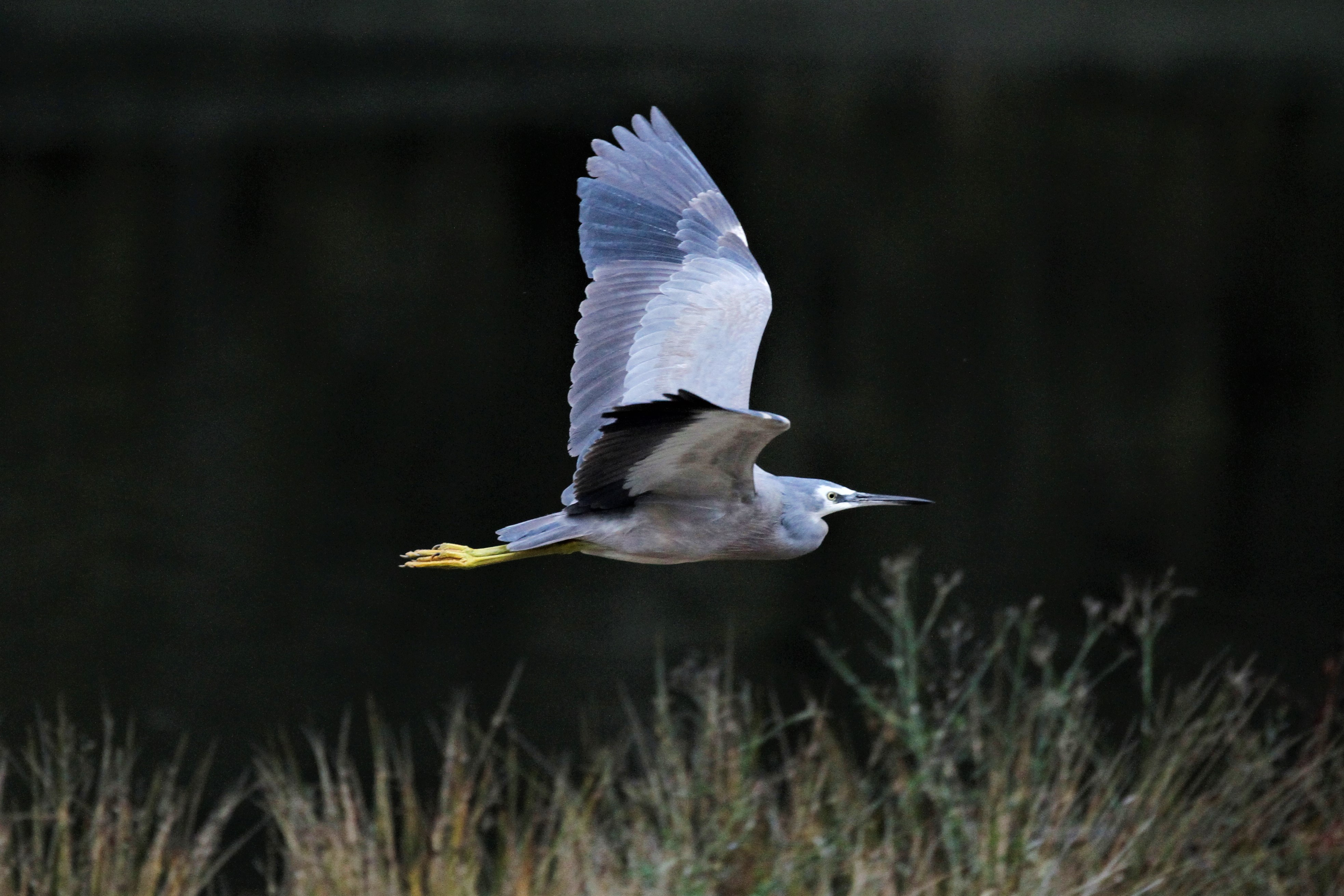
White-faced heron (Egretta novaehollandiae), demonstrating the retracted neck that is typical of herons in flight.

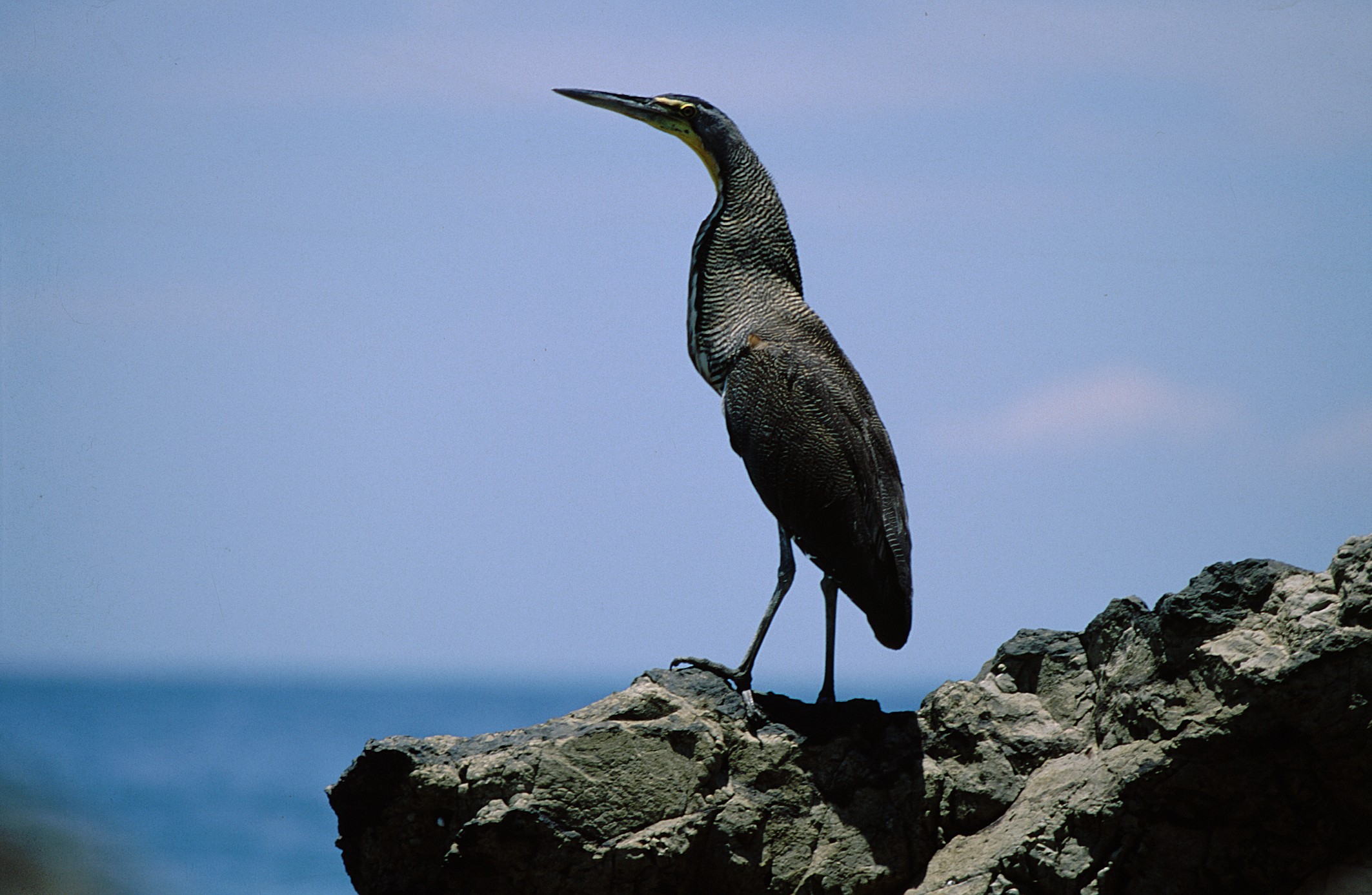
Bare-throated tiger heron (Tigrisoma mexicanum)

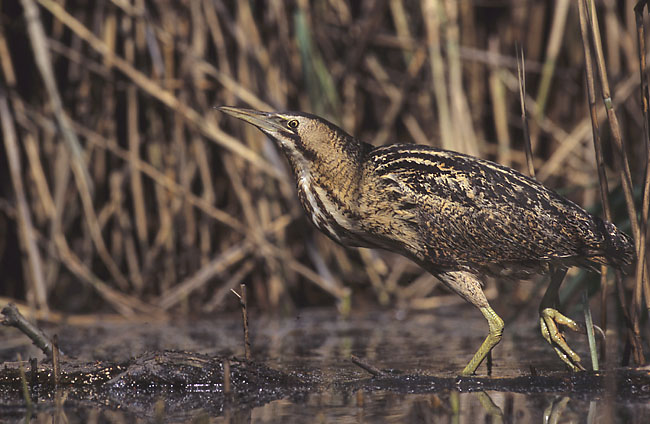
Great bittern (Botaurus stellaris)

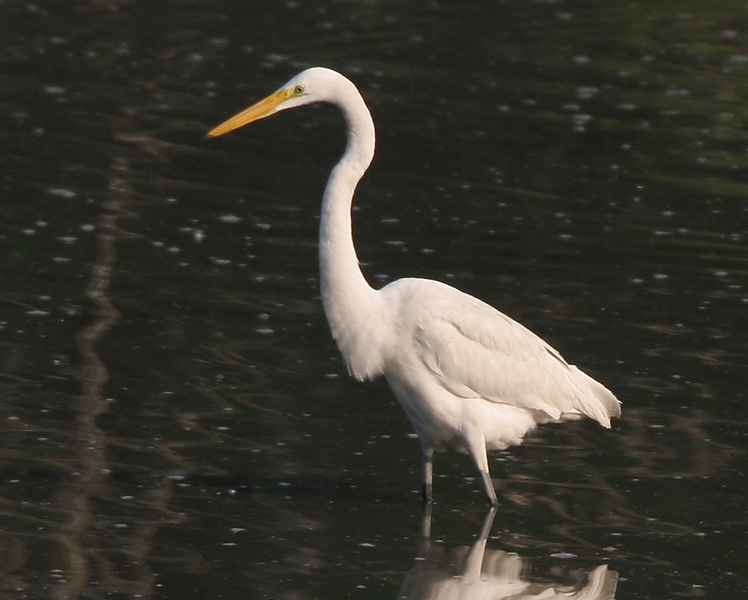
Eastern great egret (Ardea modesta)

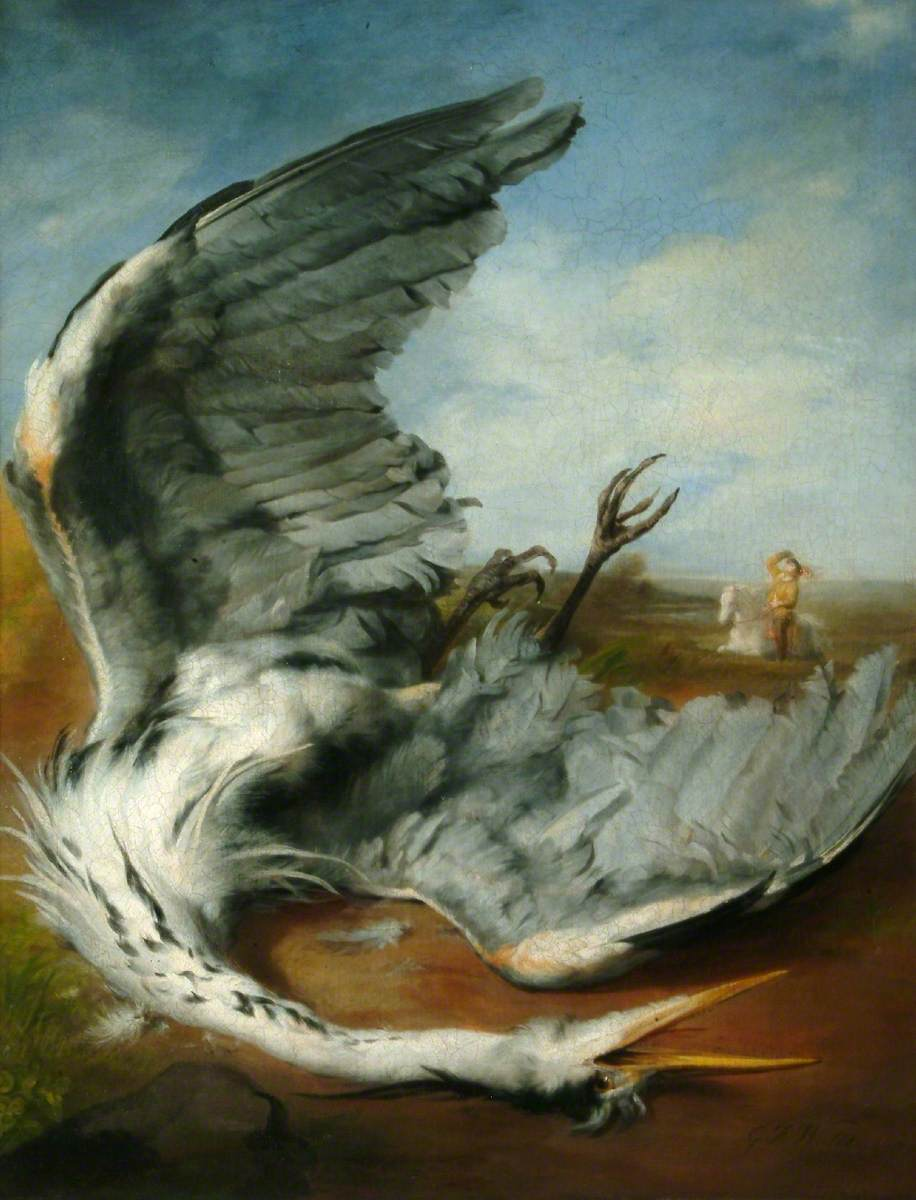
The Wounded Heron by George Frederic Watts, 1837 (Watts Gallery)

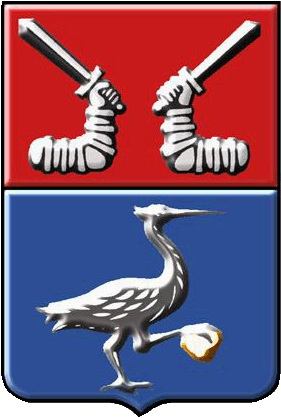
Grey heron pictured in the coat of arms of Priozersk, Russia

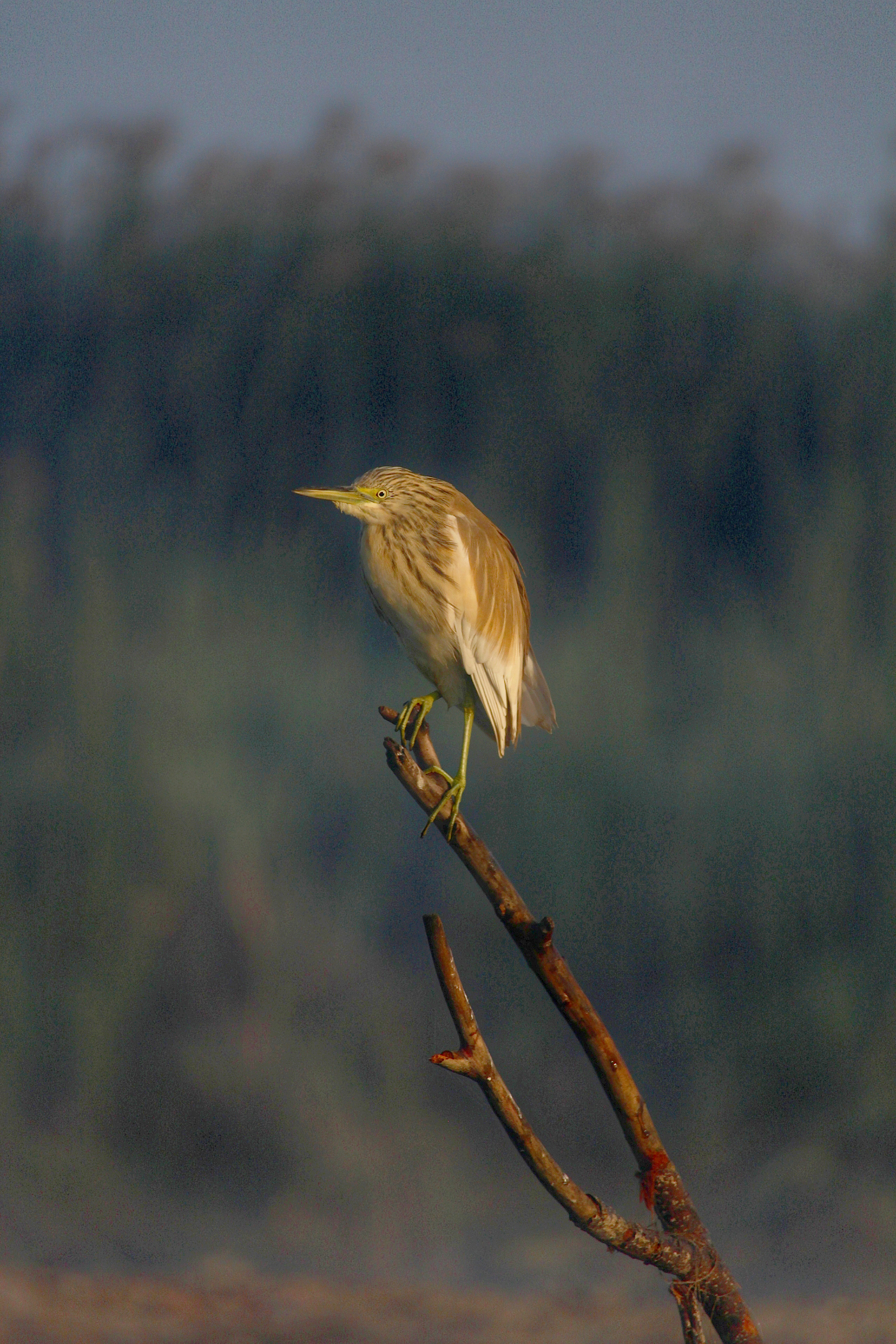
Squacco heron from Egypt

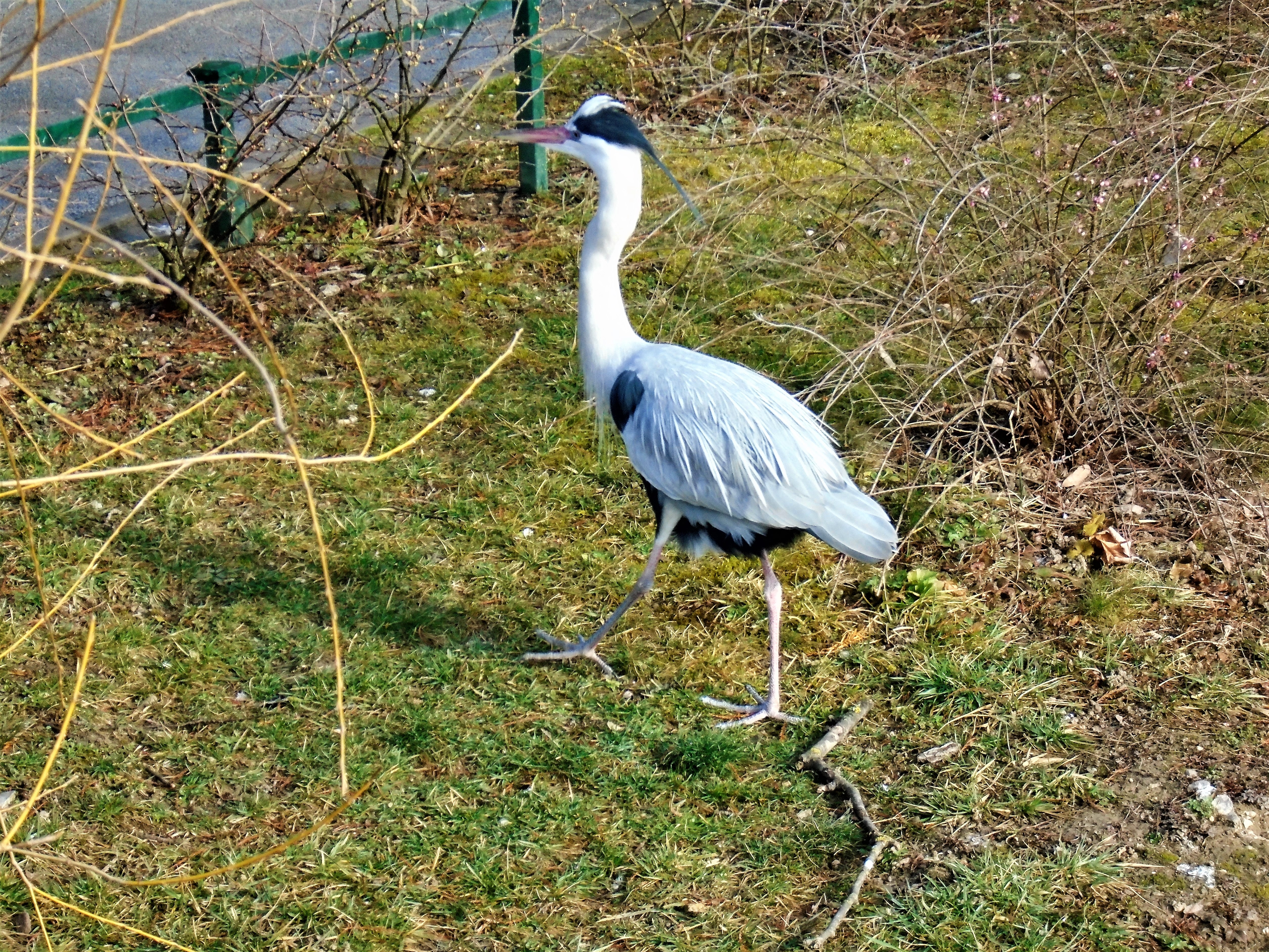
Grey heron in Zagreb Zoological Garden, Croatia
