= Zeltornis =

Zeltornis Temporal range: Early Miocene

Scientific classification
- Kingdom: Animalia
- Phylum: Chordata
- Class: Aves
- Order: Pelecaniformes
- Family: Ardeidae
- Subfamily: Ardeinae
- Genus: †Zeltornis; Balouet, 1981
- Species: †Z. ginsburgi

Binomial name
- †Zeltornis ginsburgi Balouet, 1981

Extinct genus of birds

Zeltornis ("Zelten bird") is an extinct genus of heron. It contains a single species, Zeltornis ginsburgi.

Zeltornis probably resembled the modern night herons, but was much larger, standing 2 m (6 ft 8 in) tall and weighing about 15 kg. Its wingspan is estimated at 2.50 m (8 ft 4 in). It is known from a single right coracoid of which the distal part is missing (MNHN collection, uncatalogued). Nonetheless, the partial bone is distinctive enough to place the species clearly into the heron family. In particular it seems to have been allied most closely to the night herons, although it cannot have been a direct ancestor of extant species because the modern genus Nycticorax did already exist in the Oligocene.

Zeltornis is named after the mountain Zelten in Libya, where it was found.
