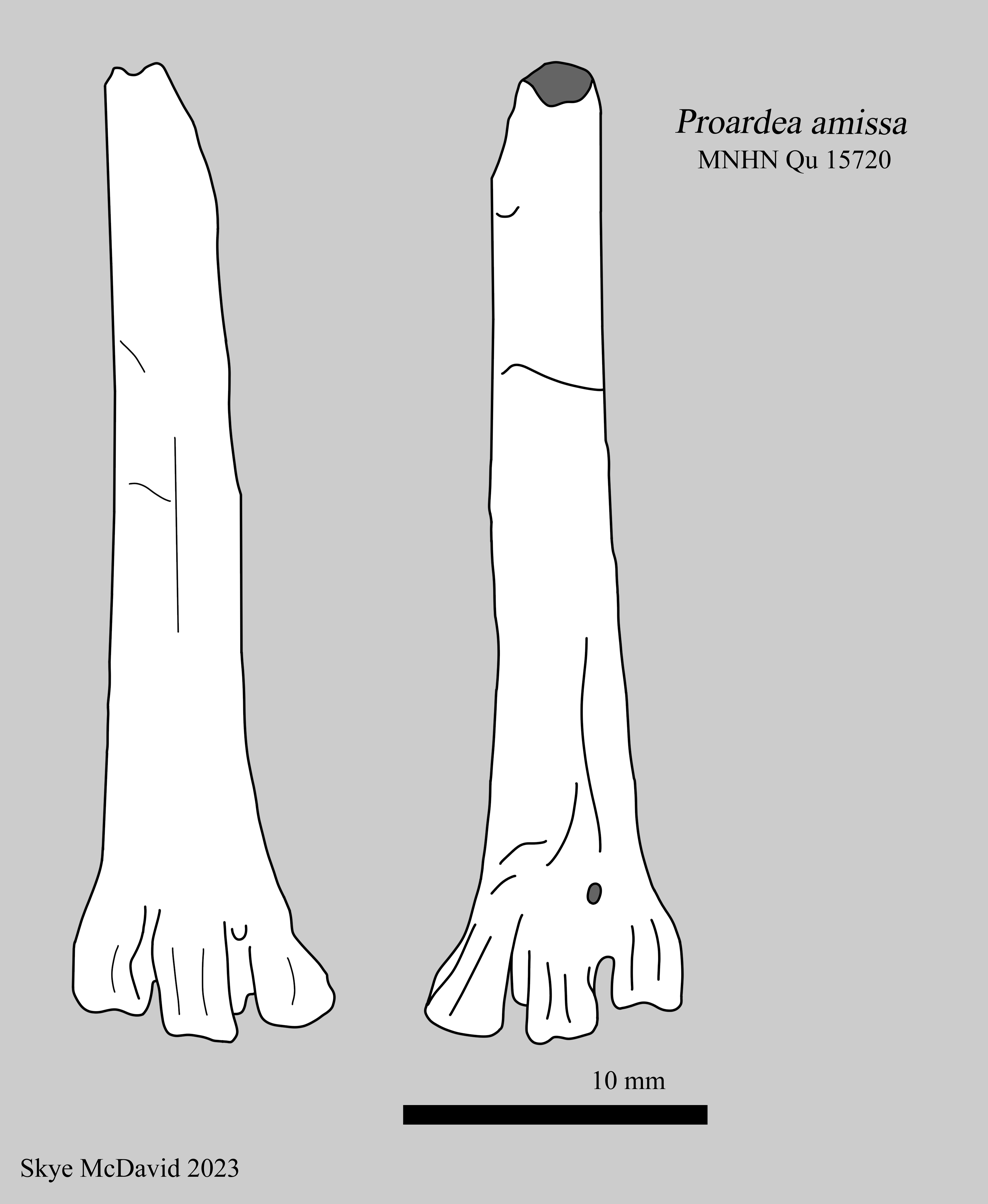
- Holotype tarsometatarsus of Proardea amissa

Scientific classification
- Kingdom: Animalia
- Phylum: Chordata
- Class: Aves
- Order: Pelecaniformes
- Family: Ardeidae
- Subfamily: Ardeinae
- Genus: †Proardea; Lambrecht, 1933

Type species
- Proardea amissa (Milne-Edwards, 1892)

Other species
- Proardea? deschutteri Mayr, et al., 2019

Synonyms
- Ardea amissa Milne-Edwards, 1892; Egretta amissa Mlíkovský & Švec 1989 and see article text

= Proardea =

Proardea Temporal range: Late Eocene? - Late Oligocene

Extinct genus of birds

Proardea is an extinct genus of heron, containing two species, Proardea amissa ("lost proto-heron") and Proardea? deschutteri from the Borgloon Formation of Belgium. It stood about 70 cm (2 ft 4 in) tall and was very similar to a modern heron in shape. The species is known from rather fragmentary fossils in the area of Quercy, France; dated remains are from Pech Desse, a Late Oligocene locality, but the original fossil, a single right tarsometatarsus (MNHN QU-15720), isn't precisely dated and may have come from deposits as early as Late Eocene in age.

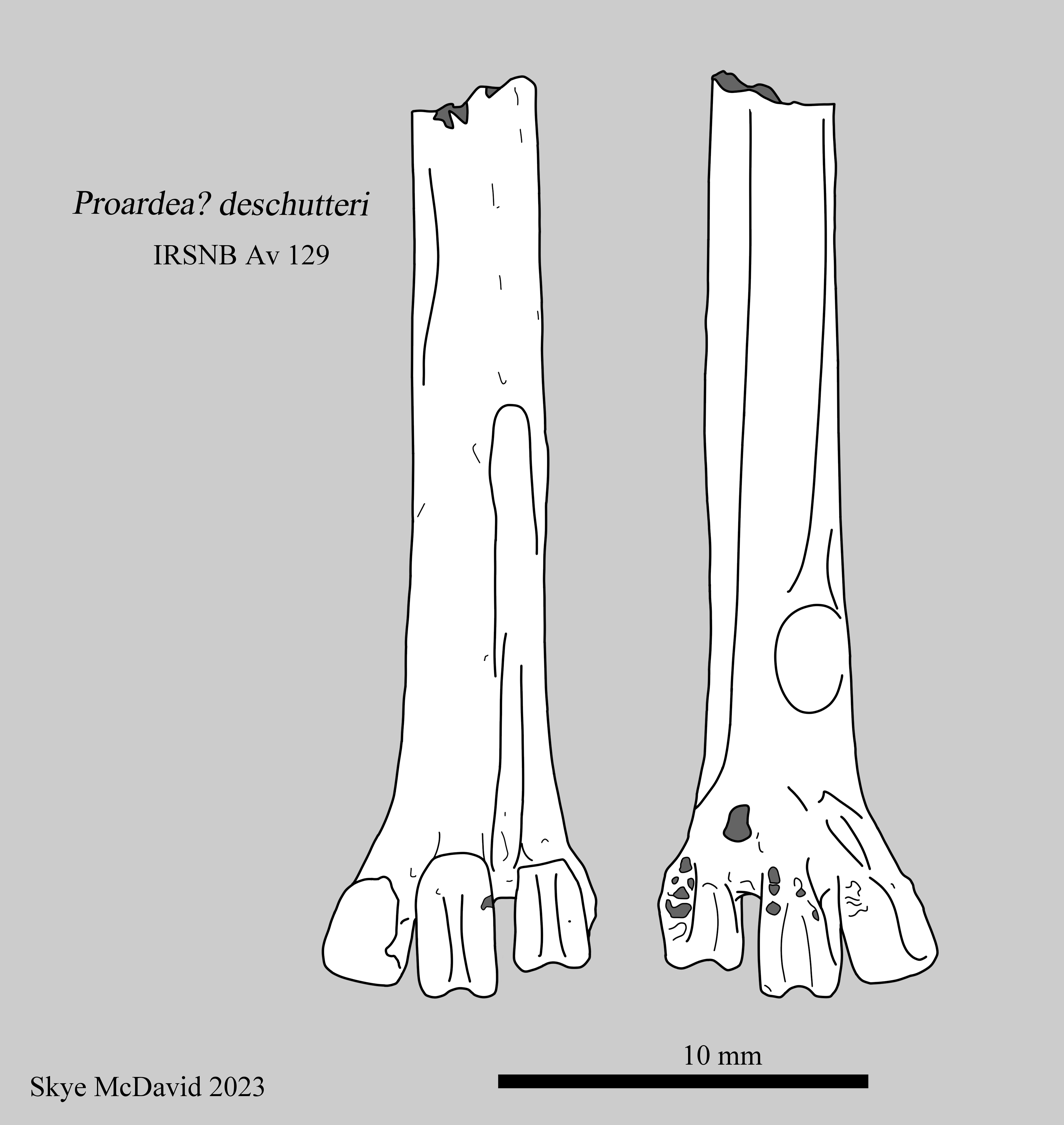
Holotype tarsometatarsus of Proardea? deschutteri.

Proardea was apparently closely related to the true herons and egrets (Ardeinae). As these genera are only known from the Miocene onwards, Proardea possibly was a direct ancestor of today's herons and/or egrets. However, the Miocene genus Proardeola is closely related, or perhaps even synonymous, with Proardea; the former's single species Proardeola walkeri may thus be Proardea walkeri or even identical with P. amissa. The bird described as Ardea aurelianensis may also be identical with P. amissa, which would in that case become known as Proardea aurelianensis. Supposed other species of Proardea, P. perplexa and P. similis, are synonyms of the ibis Geronticus perplexus and the phasianid Miogallus altus, respectively.
