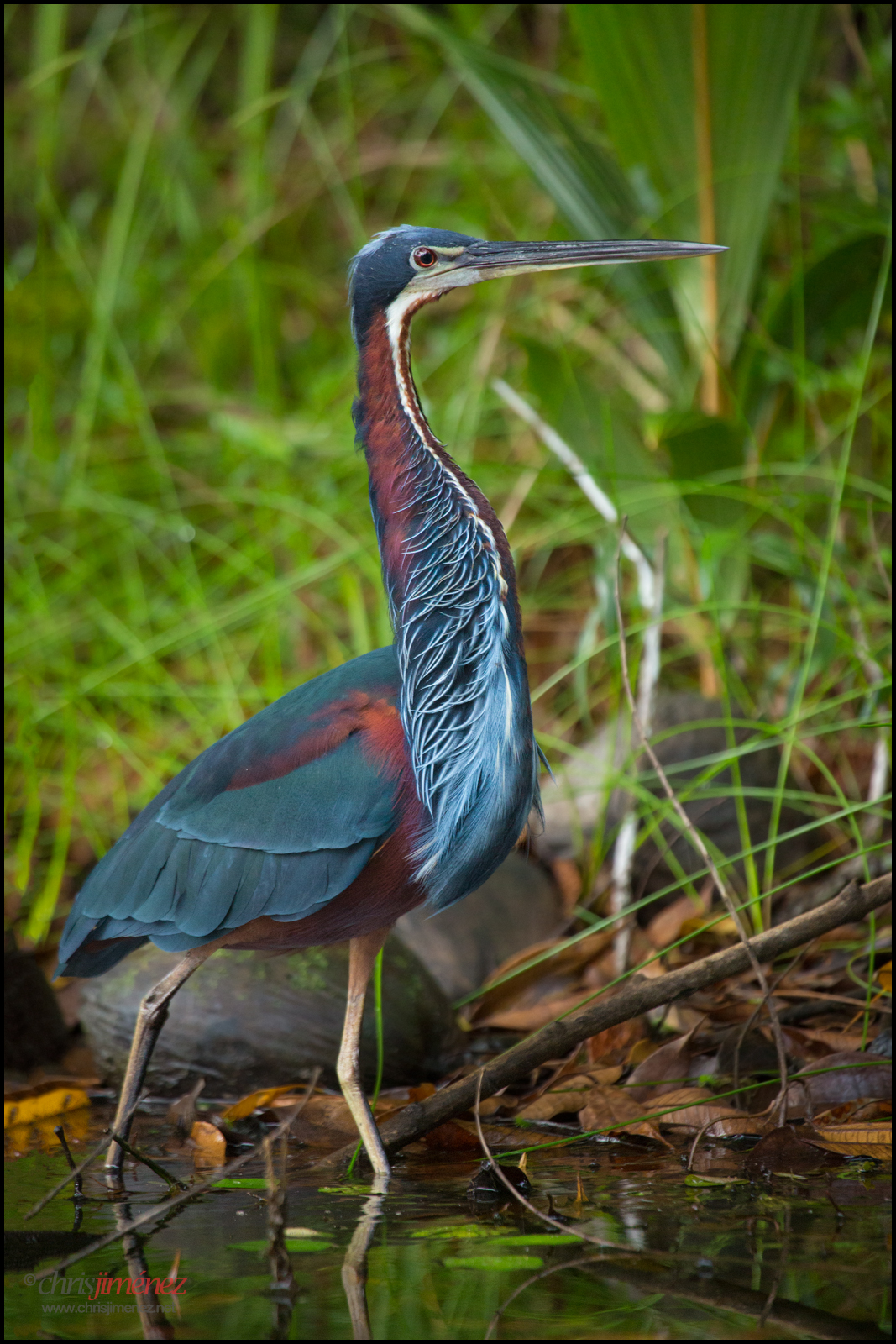
- Adult in Costa Rica

Conservation status
- Near Threatened (IUCN 3.1)

Scientific classification
- Kingdom: Animalia
- Phylum: Chordata
- Class: Aves
- Order: Pelecaniformes
- Family: Ardeidae
- Subfamily: Ardeinae
- Genus: Agamia; Reichenbach, 1853
- Species: A. agami

Binomial name
- Agamia agami (Gmelin, 1789)
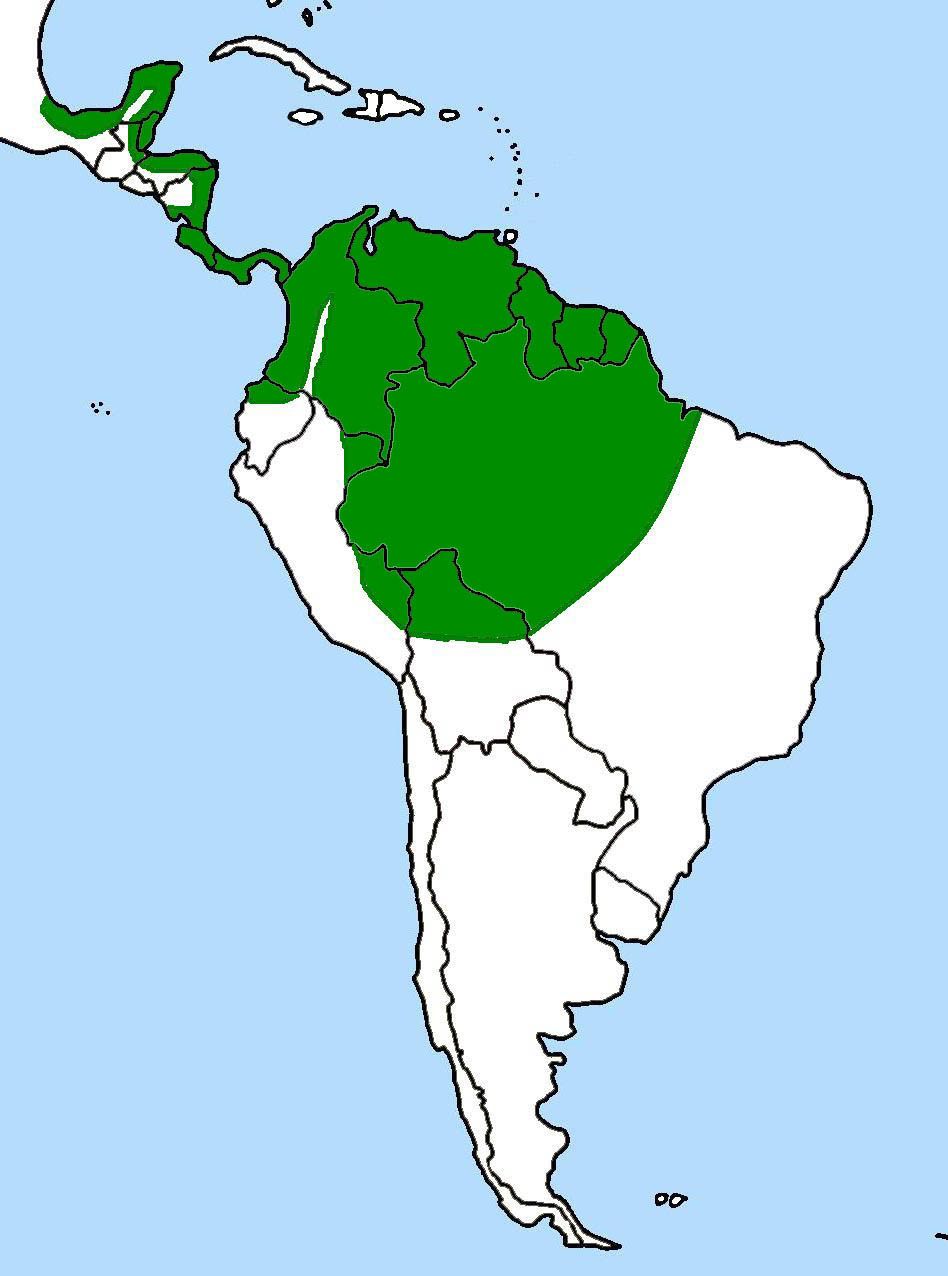
- Global range

= Agami heron =

Species of bird

The agami heron (Agamia agami) is a medium-sized heron. It is a resident breeding bird from Central America south to Peru and Brazil. It is sometimes known as the chestnut-bellied heron, and is the only member of the genus Agamia. In Brazil it is sometimes called Soco beija-flor, meaning 'hummingbird heron', thanks to its unique coloration pattern.

The agami heron is listed as Near Threatened by the IUCN, due to predictions of future habitat destruction within its range.

== Taxonomy ==
The agami heron was formally described in 1789 by the German naturalist Johann Friedrich Gmelin in his revised and expanded edition of Carl Linnaeus's Systema Naturae. He placed it with the herons and cranes in the genus Ardea and coined the binomial name Ardea agami. Gmelin based his description on the "Agami heron" from Cayenne that had been described in 1785 by the English ornithologist John Latham in his book A General Synopsis of Birds. Latham had in turn based his description on a specimen owned by the army officer Thamas Davies and the description and illustration of "Le Héron Agami" by the French polymath Comte de Buffon in his Histoire Naturelle des Oiseaux. The agami heron is now the only species placed in the genus Agamia that was introduced in 1853 by the German naturalist Ludwig Reichenbach. The name agami is the word for Grey-winged trumpeter that's used by the indigenous people of French Guiana. The species is monotypic: no subspecies are recognised.

== Description ==
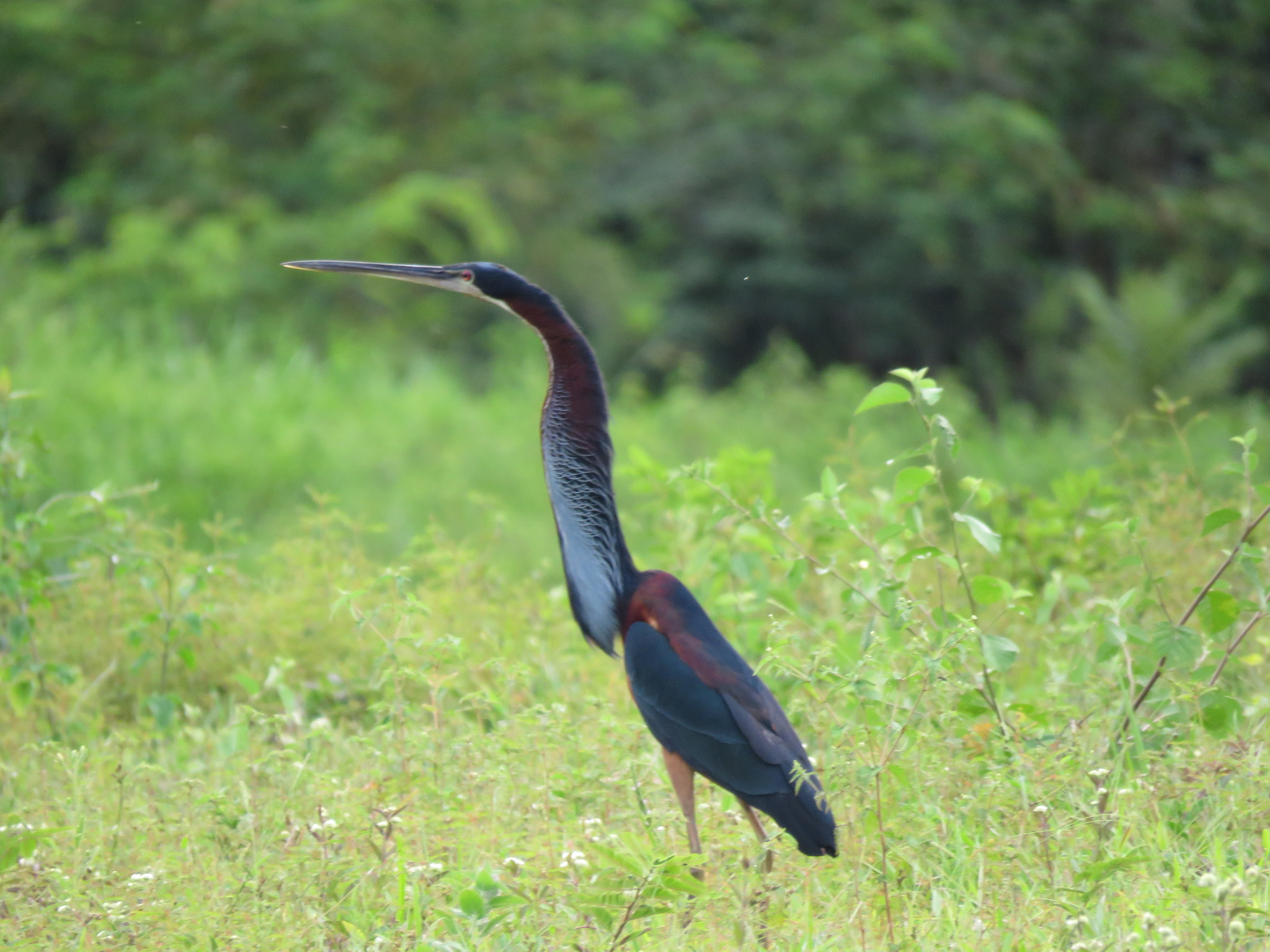
In Bolivia

This uncommon species is 66–76 centimetres (26–30 inches) in length. It is short-legged for a heron, and has a thin bill which is considerably longer than the head. The neck and underparts are chestnut, with a white line down the centre of the foreneck, and the wings are shiny green. Wispy pale blue feathers decorate the crown, sides of the foreneck, and lower back. The legs, bill, and bare facial patch are dull yellow. During the breeding season the facial patch can change color to reddish. The sexes are similar, but juveniles are largely brown above with a white foreneck, and streaked brown-and-white underparts. The normal clutch size is two blue eggs.

The species has a 15 cm long bill, which has been described as extremely long, allowing it to strike prey from greater distances from its body than similarly sized heron species sporting shorter bills.

== Distribution and habitat ==
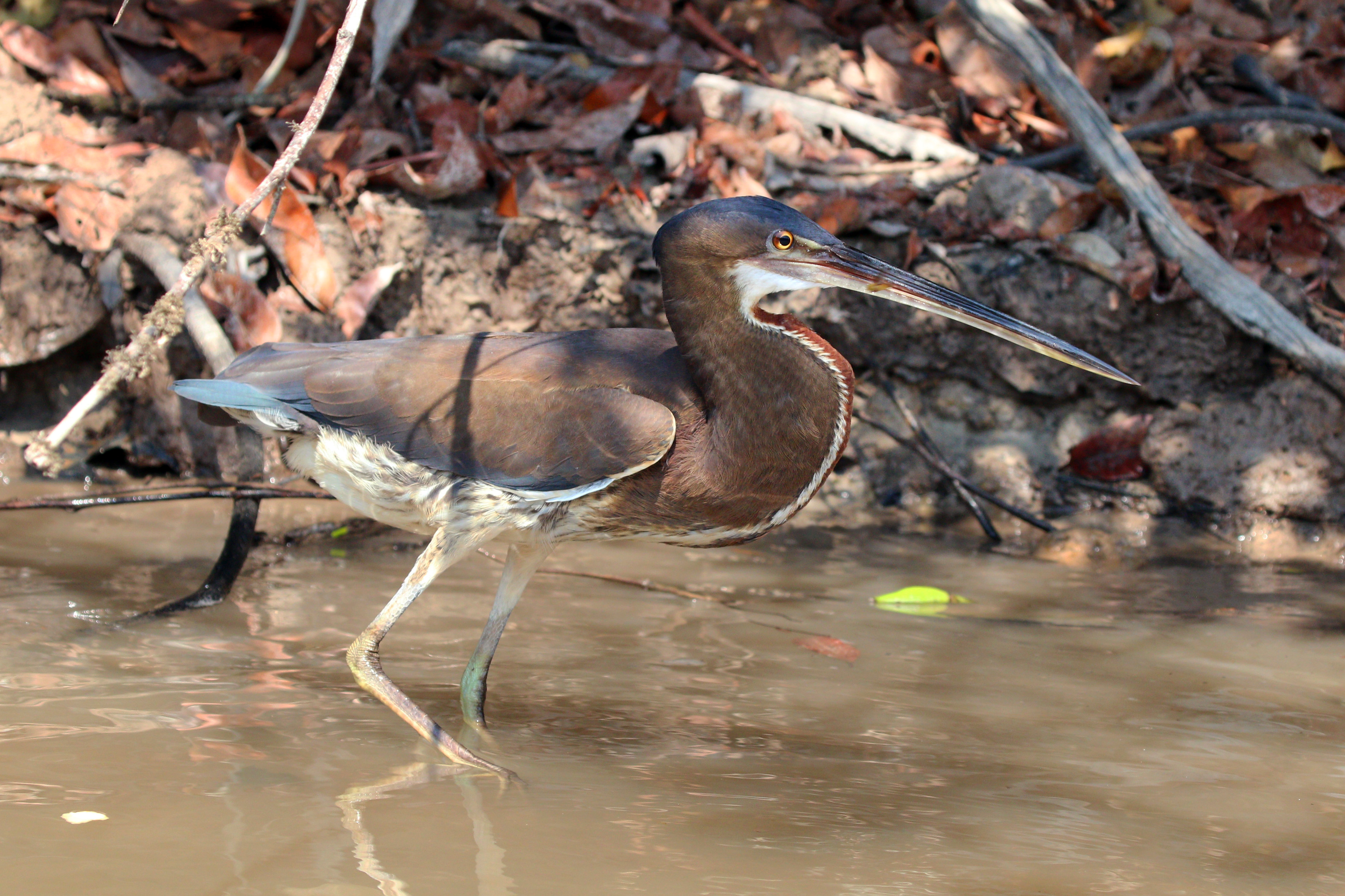
Juvenile, in Brazil

The agami heron is a Neotropical species occurring in Central and South America. The distribution area of the species extends from south-east Mexico through central and Caribbean Central America through the Amazon basin in South America, covering the following countries: Mexico, Guatemala, Belize, El Salvador, Honduras, Nicaragua, Costa Rica, Panama, Colombia, Ecuador, French Guiana, Suriname, Guyana, Venezuela, Peru, Bolivia and Brazil.

This species is rare in open areas. The agami heron's habitat encompasses swamp forests, mangroves, forest streams and freshwater wetlands. They mostly occur at elevations between sea level and 300 metres (1,000 feet), although records exist from as elevations as high as 2,600 metres (8,500 feet) in the Andes. They nest in both single species and mixed species colonies on platforms of sticks in bushes and trees over water. Very few colonies are known to date but some are quite large, up to hundreds or even over a thousand nests. The following locations of colonies are known within the distribution area of the species:on a tiny island at the centre of a lagoon in the middle of the Pacuare Nature Reserve, Costa Rica, in the Tapiche Reserve, Peru, the Marais de Kaw-Roura National Reserve and Amazonian National Park, French Guiana, and other colonies outside of protected areas in Colombia, Mexico and Belize.

== Behavior ==
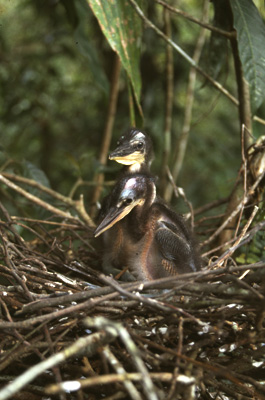
Chicks

Despite its stunning plumage, this reclusive species' preference for shade and overhanging vegetation means that it is rarely seen. This is a quiet bird, but pairs and family groups may make various snoring or rattling sounds. Rattling sounds and slow walking away are a typical response to disturbance.

Agami herons stalk their prey (fish, frogs, small reptiles, and snails) in shallow shaded water in forested areas. They often stand still on perches or directly in the water, or moving very slowly. They rarely wade in open water. At Cocha Cashu, a 1985 study found that 52% of their prey during the late dry season consisted of characids, particularly Triportheus angulatus and Astyanax sp., which are surface-swimming fishes. Prey mostly measured 2-10 cm in length. Less commonly, they have also been known to consume cichlids (Aequidens).

Several courtship behaviors have been described and are used by both sexes. Lores can change color to an intense red, and both sexes show a short-lived silver crest.

== Conservation ==
This species is very discreet and scientifically little known, which is a challenge for conservationists. Its remote habitat and secretive behavior may explain its apparent rarity. However, it is considered as near threatened by the IUCN Red List due to future habitat loss in the Amazon. Conservation efforts should concentrate on protection of important colony sites, developing a better understanding of the range, habitat needs and biology of the species. This may include genetic testing of individuals from among the widespread range to identify possible sub-speciation.
