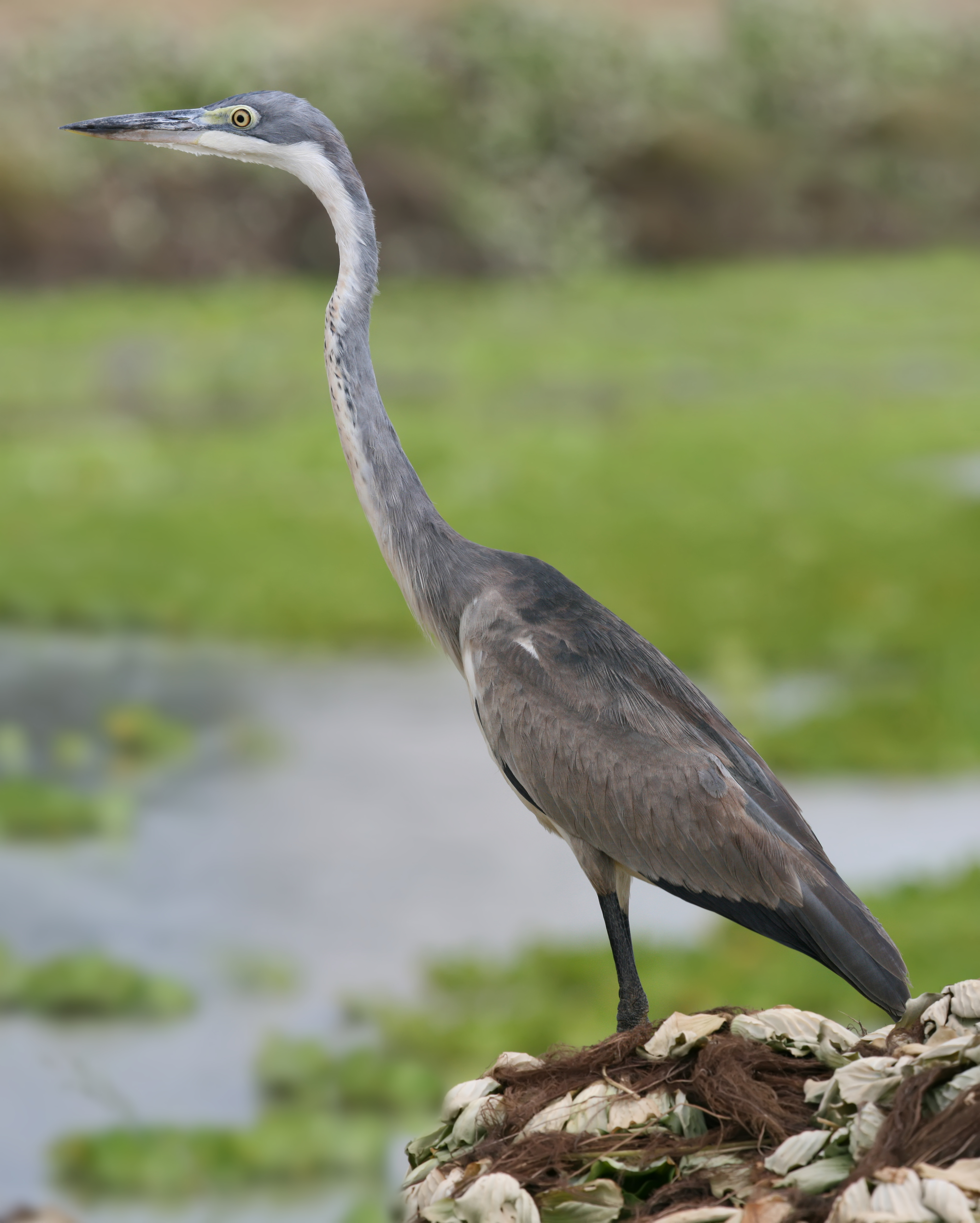
- Mikumi National Park, Tanzania

Conservation status
- Least Concern (IUCN 3.1)

Scientific classification
- Kingdom: Animalia
- Phylum: Chordata
- Class: Aves
- Order: Pelecaniformes
- Family: Ardeidae
- Genus: Ardea
- Species: A. melanocephala

Binomial name
- Ardea melanocephala Children & Vigors, 1826
- Distribution map of Black-headed heron

Audio
- Calls at dusk at a heronry

= Black-headed heron =

Species of bird

The black-headed heron (Ardea melanocephala) is a wading bird of the heron family Ardeidae, common throughout much of sub-Saharan Africa and Madagascar. It is mainly resident, but some west African birds move further north in the rainy season.

This species usually breeds in the wet season in colonies in trees, reedbeds or cliffs. It builds a bulky stick nest and lays 2–4 eggs.

It often feeds in shallow water, spearing fish or frogs with its long, sharp bill. It also hunts well away from water, taking large insects, small mammals, and birds. It waits motionless for its prey, or slowly stalk its victim.

The black-headed heron is a large bird, standing 85 cm tall, and it has a 150 cm wingspan. It is nearly as large as the grey heron, which it resembles in appearance, although it is generally darker. Its plumage is largely grey above, and paler grey below. It has a powerful dusky bill.

The flight is slow, with the neck retracted. This is characteristic of herons and bitterns, and distinguishes them from storks, cranes, and spoonbills, which extend their necks. The white underwing coverts are striking in flight.

The call is a loud croaking.

== Gallery ==
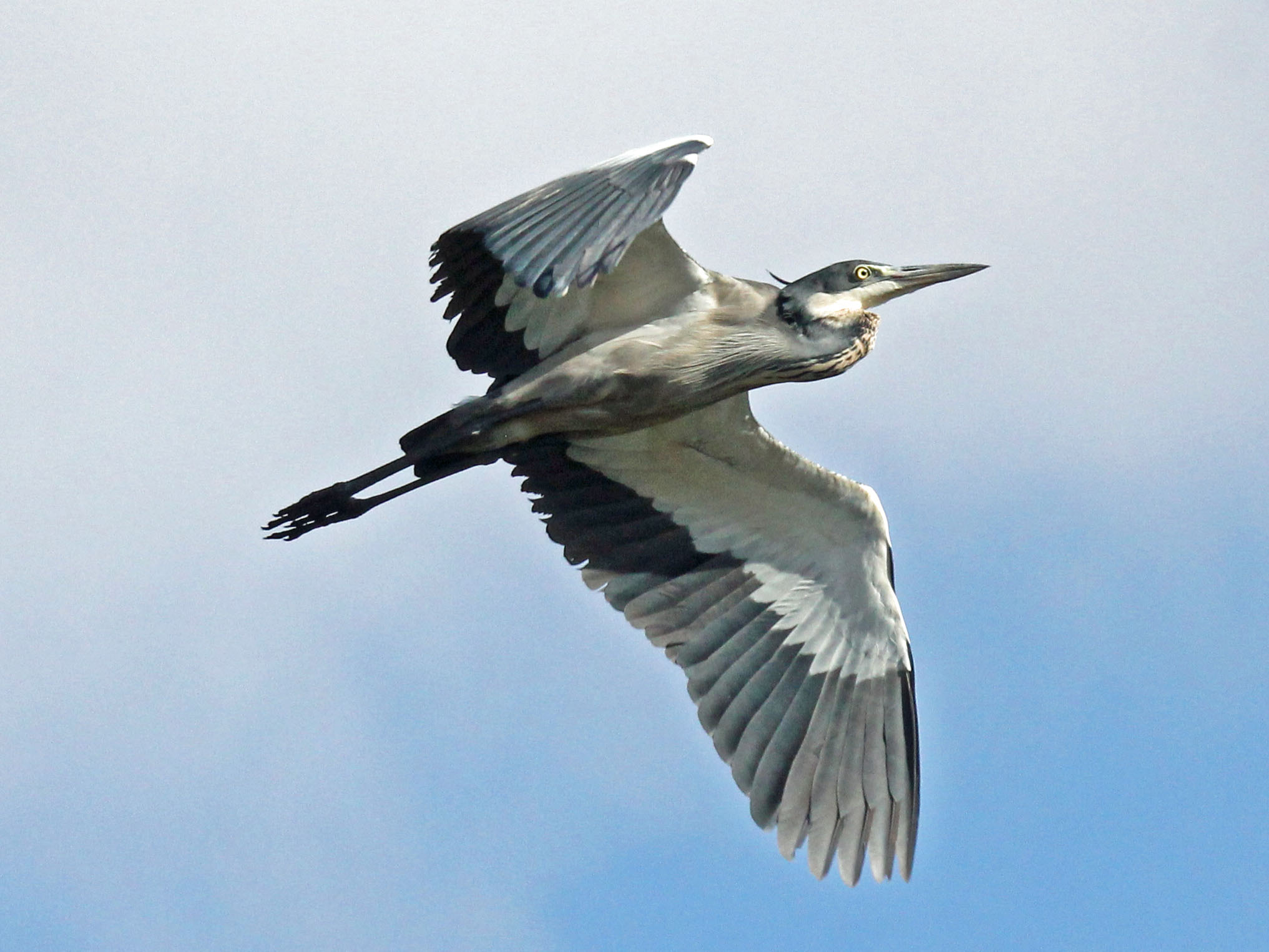

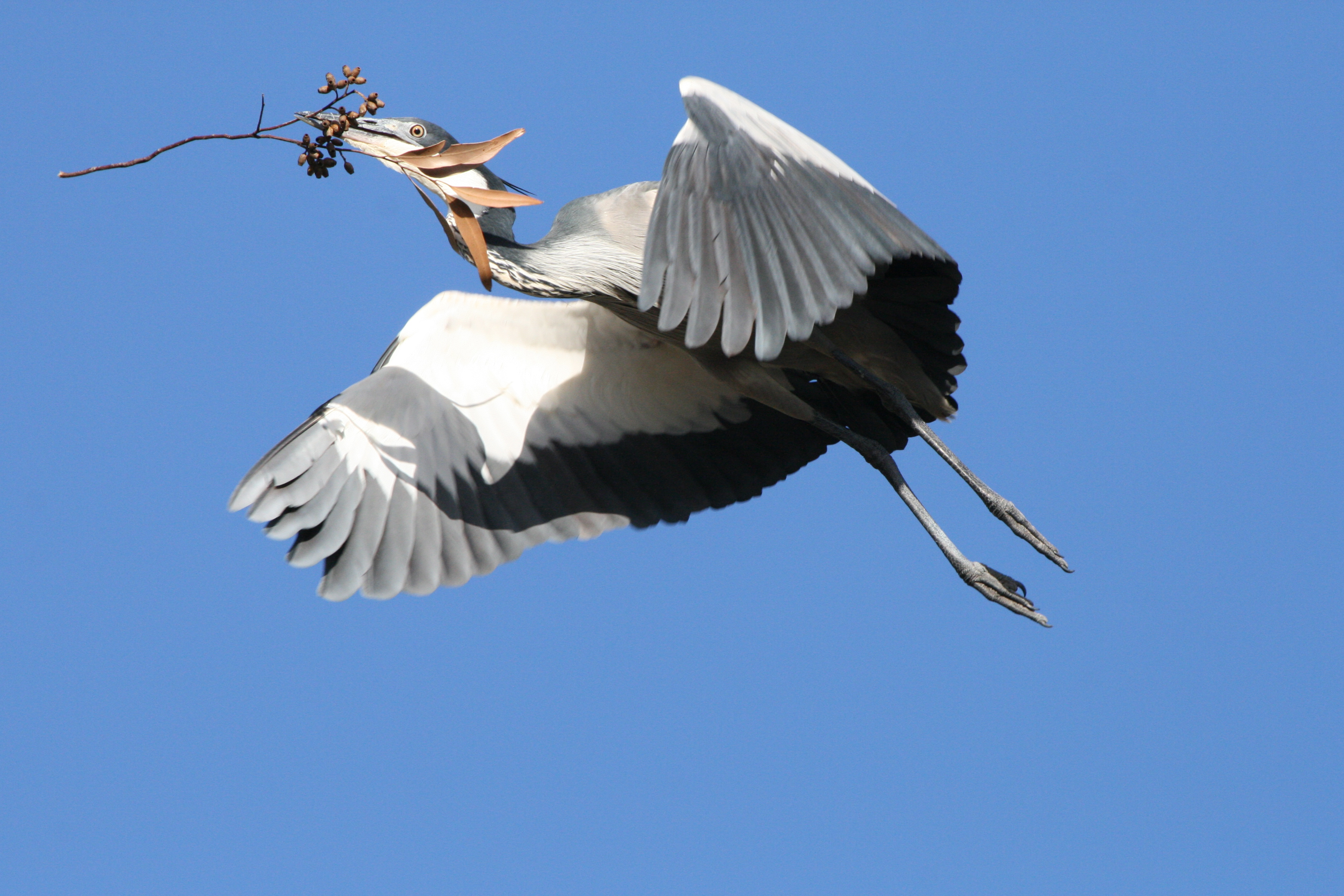
Gathering nest material

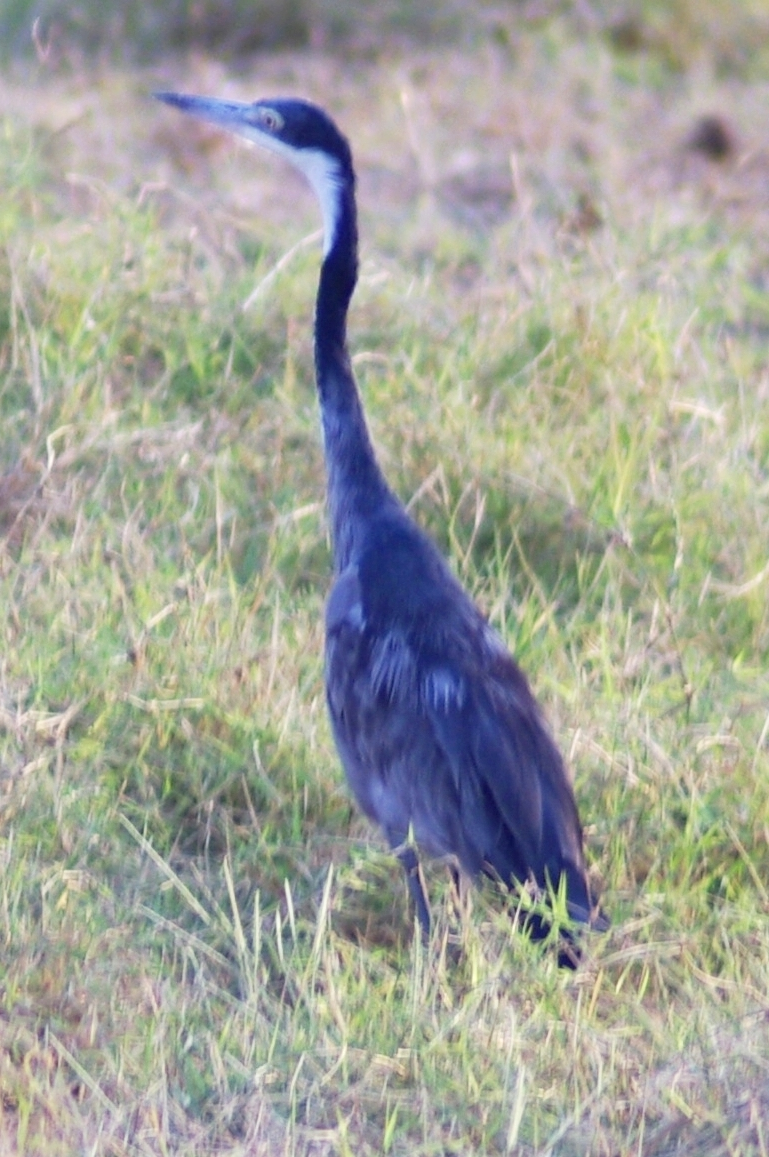
Amboseli National Park, Kenya

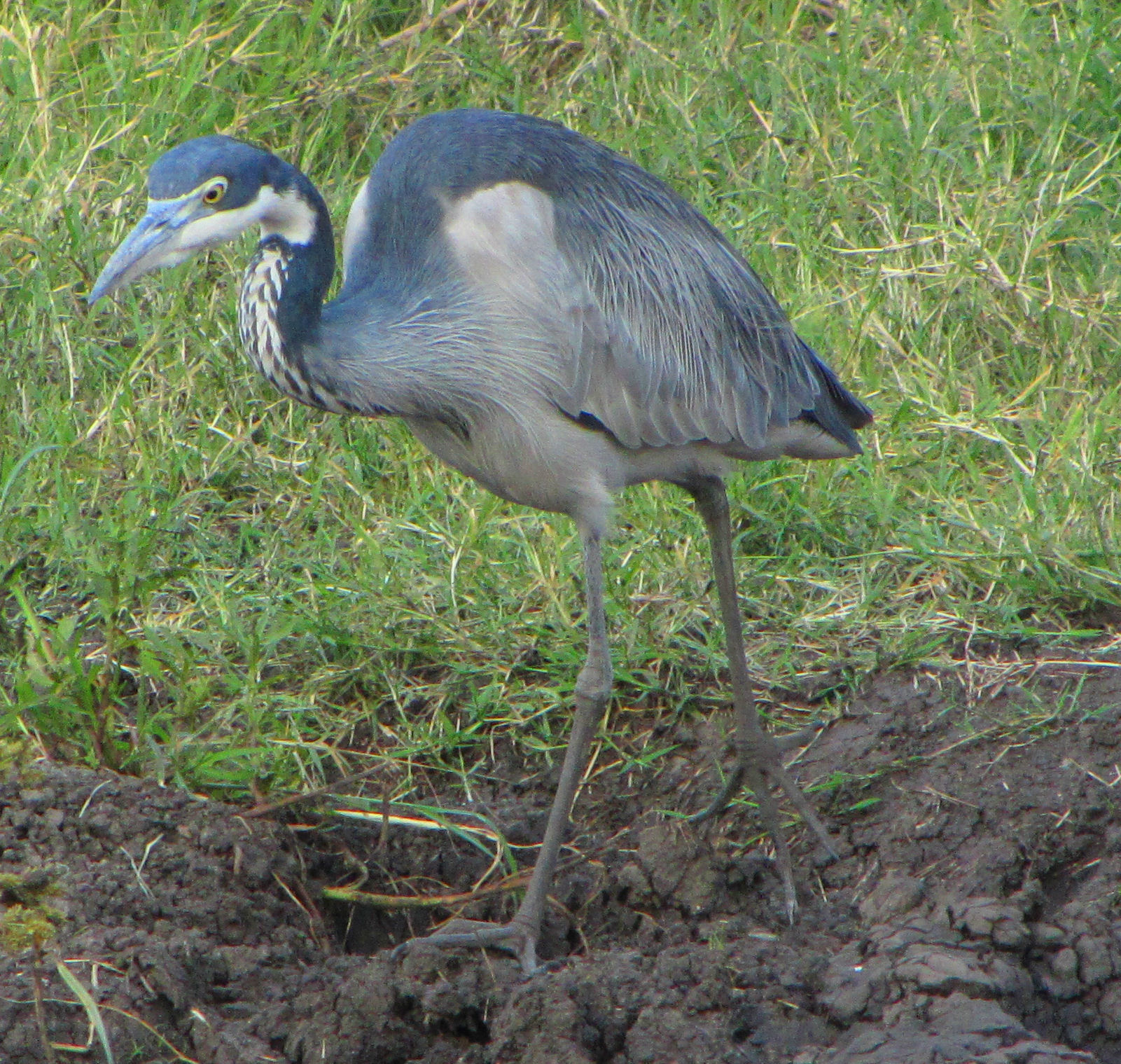
Serengeti National Park, Tanzania

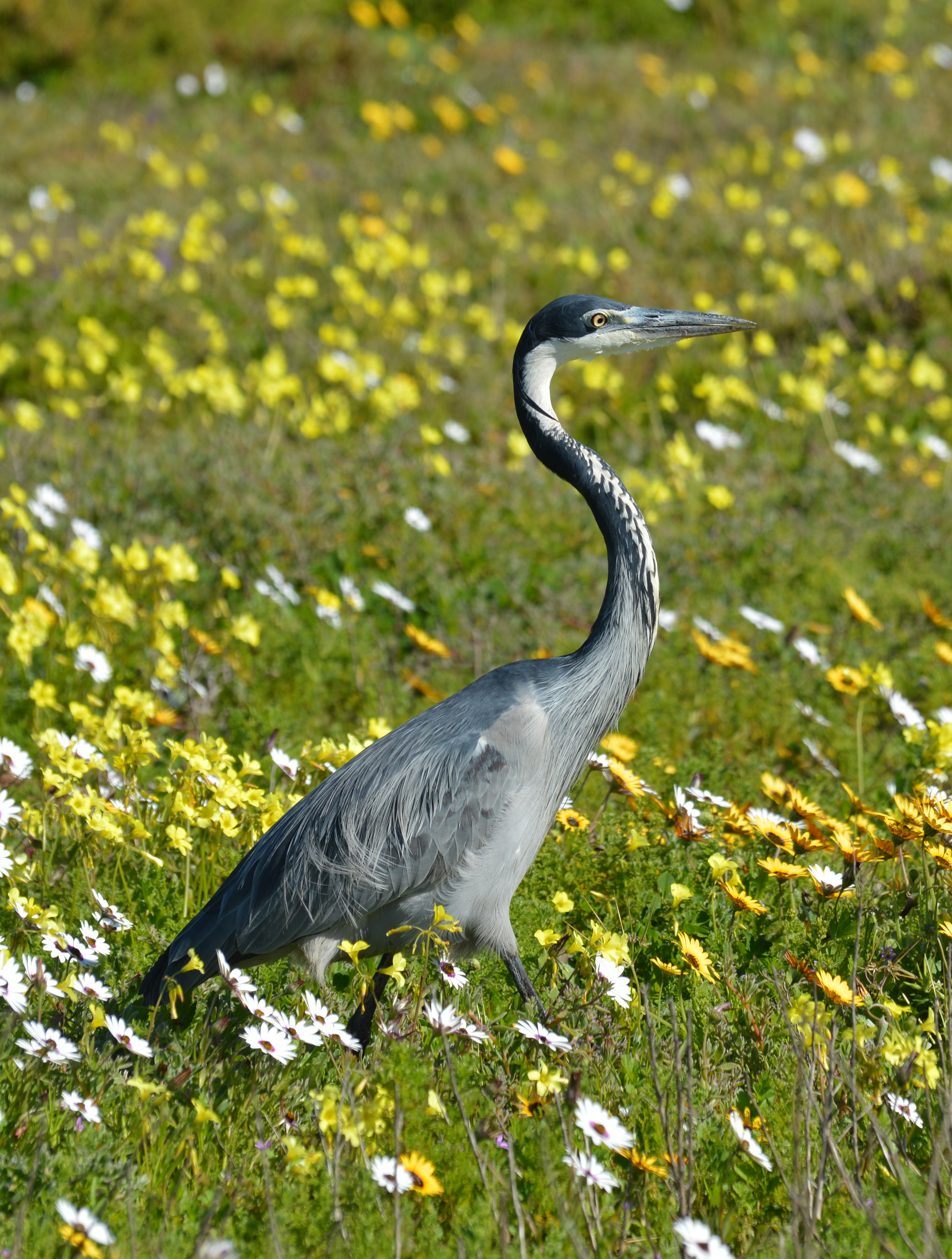
West Coast National Park, South Africa
