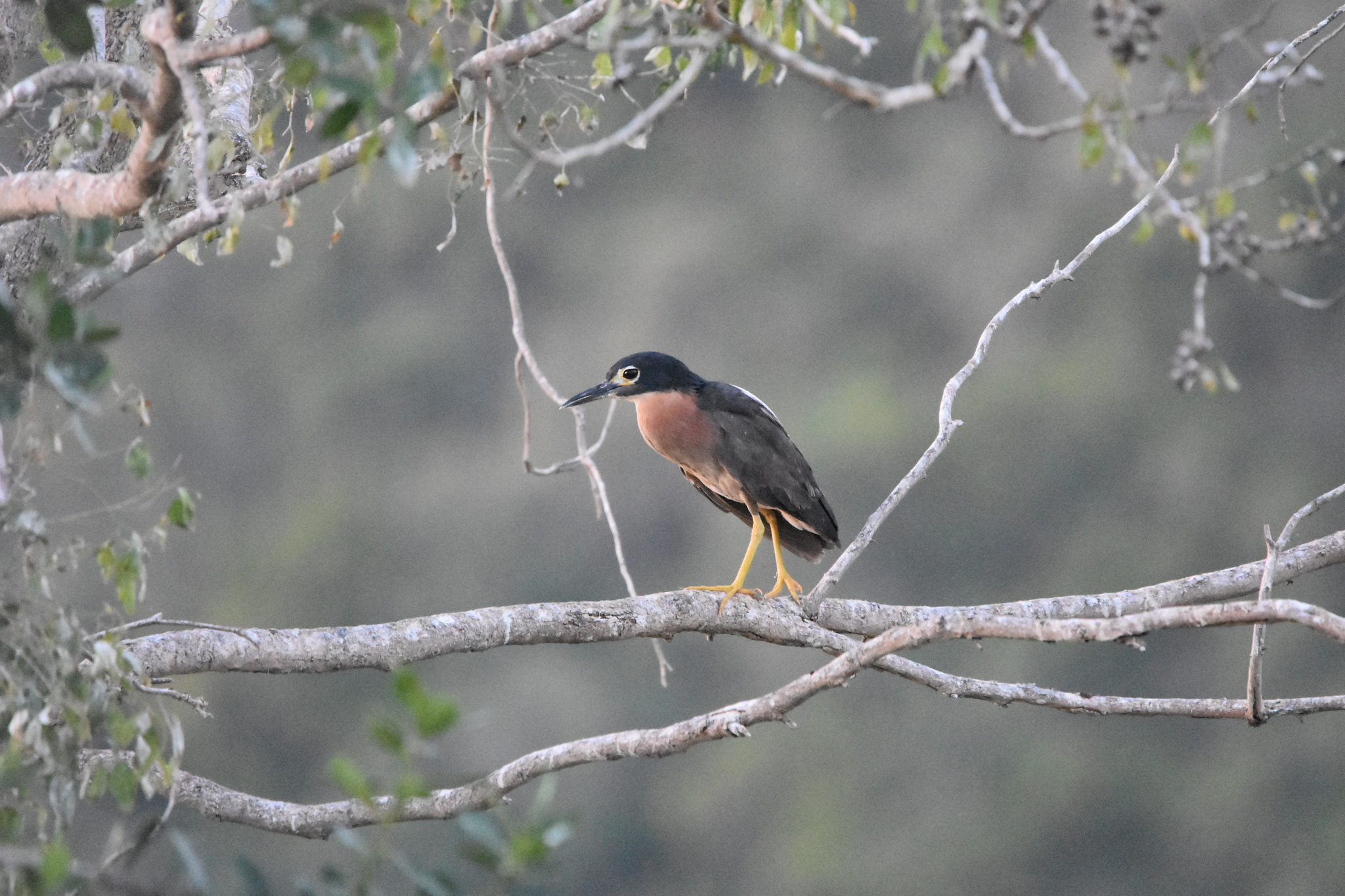

Conservation status
- Least Concern (IUCN 3.1)

Scientific classification
- Kingdom: Animalia
- Phylum: Chordata
- Class: Aves
- Order: Pelecaniformes
- Family: Ardeidae
- Genus: Calherodius; Bonaparte, 1855
- Species: C. leuconotus

Binomial name
- Calherodius leuconotus (Wagler, 1827)

Synonyms
- Ardea leuconotus; Nycticorax leuconotus; Gorsachius leuconotus

= White-backed night heron =

Species of bird

The white-backed night heron (Calherodius leuconotus) is a species of medium-sized heron in the family Ardeidae, found in sub-Saharan Africa.

== Taxonomy ==
The white-backed night heron was formally described in 1827 by the German naturalist Johann Wagler under the binomial name Ardea leuconotus. He specified the type locality as Senegambia. This species was formerly placed with the Japanese night heron and the Malayan night heron in the genus Gorsachius. Based on the results of a molecular genetic study published in 2023, it is now the only species placed in the resurrected genus Calherodius that had originally been introduced in 1855 by the French naturalist Charles Bonaparte. Bonaparte specified the type species as Ardea cucullata Lichtenstein which is now considered to be a junior synonym of Ardea leuconotus Wagler. The species is treated as monotypic: no subspecies are recognised.

== Description ==
The white-backed night heron is 50–55 cm (20–22 in) in length with a black head and a short crest, or prominent feather display on the top of its head. The heron has large red eyes with white-ringed markings around them, and the lores, or the region behind the eye, are a pale yellow hue. The throat feathers are white, whereas the neck and breast are rufous, or a reddish-brown hue. There is a notable white triangular patch along the back formed by the white scapulars, or small feathers, on the shoulder of the bird. The belly feathers are a whitish-brown and the legs are yellow. An immature heron can be identified by its streaked breast and the white spots on the upper-wing coverts. Chicks are covered with olive-brown down.

== Distribution and habitat ==
The white-backed night heron is located throughout central and southern Africa, with a range estimated at 20,900,000 km^{2} (8,100,000 sq mi). Its primary habitat is dense forests with neighboring waterways, particularly streams, lakes, mangroves and marshes.

== Behavior and ecology ==
The white-backed night heron can be found living individually or in pairs. Nocturnal by nature, they roost in the dense vegetation of marshes and forests during the daylight hours, often nesting high within the trees. Their nests are well-hidden, usually built in vegetation near water and sometimes in reedbeds, mangroves, rocks and caves. The nest is built resembling a platform of sticks or reeds, 25–30 cm (9.8–11.8 in) wide. They usually breed during the rainy season or early in the dry season. There are two to three greenish-white eggs in a clutch, and incubation lasts roughly 24 to 26 days. The chicks leave the nest after six to seven weeks. The white-backed night heron seems to be sedentary, but it has been observed in some circumstances to have migrated to locations with heavy rain. White-backed night herons are known foragers, meaning they search for food primarily along waterways. They have been observed to eat fish, amphibians, mollusks and insects. Though usually quiet, they let out a loud kroak call when alarmed and a taash call when disturbed.

== Status ==
The population of the white-backed night heron is believed to be stable because it does not appear to undergo significant population declines or experience any notable threats. Due to these factors and its large range, the IUCN Red List has assessed the species to be of least concern. The species is currently experiencing a small number of threats, including habitat loss in southern Africa and hunting in Nigeria, where they are used for traditional medicine.
