= Miletouteichos =

Coordinates: 40°12′47″N 28°25′45″E

Miletouteichos (Ancient Greek: Μιλητουτεῖχος) was a Greek town located near the coast of the Propontis in ancient Mysia. It is mentioned in the Hellenica Oxyrhynchia: in the year 395 BCE, the troops of Agesilaus II, king of Sparta, departing from Cius, attacked Miletouteichos, but they could not take it and they retired, marching next by the Rhyndacus river to Dascylium.

Scholars have debated the name. The toponym also appears in an inscription where a theorodokos is mentioned in Miletouteichos around 330 BCE. It may be that the place-name appears in an Athenian decree of the year 410/09 BCE. Some scholars have identified Miletouteichos with Miletopolis, but others contend that they are two different cities. Another possibility that has been suggested is to identify it with the city of Apollonia ad Rhyndacum. It has been suggested as possible site of Miletouteichos is northwest of Lake Apolloniatis, in the current Uluabat, in Bursa Province, Turkey.
