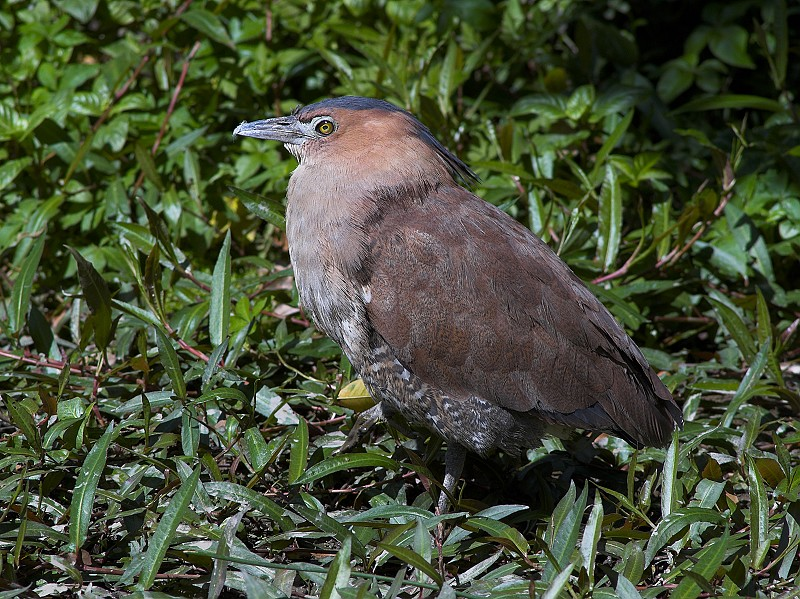
- Malayan night heron (Gorsachius melanolophus)

Scientific classification
- Kingdom: Animalia
- Phylum: Chordata
- Class: Aves
- Order: Pelecaniformes
- Family: Ardeidae
- Subfamily: Ardeinae
- Genus: Gorsachius; Bonaparte, 1855

Type species
- Nycticorax goisagi Temminck, 1836

Species
- 2, see text

= Gorsachius =

Genus of birds

Gorsachius is a genus of Old World night herons typically found near water in forested regions. These are medium-sized herons which are migratory in the colder parts of their ranges, but otherwise resident. They are the least known, most strictly nocturnal, smallest and overall rarest night herons.

They are found in East, South and South-east Asia. Both species resemble each other, being relatively short-billed and overall brown with a dark line from the throat to the upper belly.

Their behavior is relatively poorly known compared to that of other night herons, but they nest alone or in small groups, and a clutch of two to five eggs has been recorded. While generally nocturnal and crepuscular, they have been recorded feeding during the day in clouded weather. They are skulking, and known to feed on crabs, crustacean, fish, insects, frogs and other small animals.

== Taxonomy ==
These night herons were formerly placed in the genus Nycticorax, but today all major authorities recognize them as separate. In addition to the species listed below, the rufous or nankeen night heron has been placed in Gorsachius, but today all major authorities place it in Nycticorax. The white-backed night heron from sub-Saharan Africa and the white-eared night heron from China and Vietnam were previously placed in this genus, while they are now place in two monotypic genera.

Genus Gorsachius – Bonaparte, 1855 – two species
Common name	Scientific name and subspecies	Range	Size and ecology	IUCN status and estimated population
Japanese night heron	Gorsachius goisagi (Temminck, 1836)	Korea, Russia, Japan, the Philippines and Indonesia.	Size: Habitat: Diet:	VU
Malayan night heron	Gorsachius melanolophus (Raffles, 1822)	India, Sri Lanka, Brunei, Nepal, Bangladesh, Myanmar, Cambodia, Laos, Vietnam, Thailand, Malaysia, Singapore, China, Indonesia, the Philippines, Taiwan and Japan.	Size: Habitat: Diet:	LC
