= Battle of Acronis =

- Part of the Byzantine–Seljuk wars
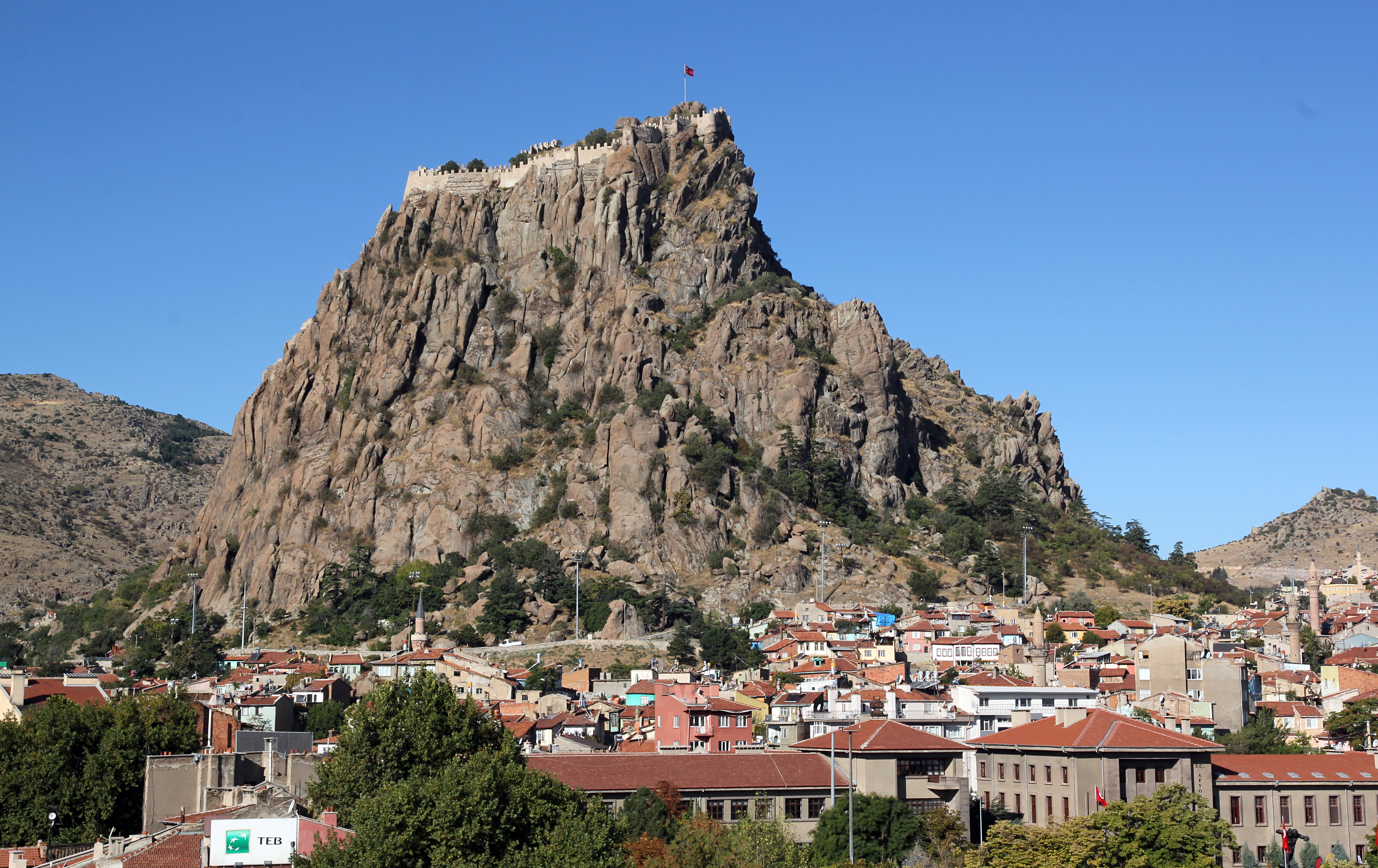
- Image of Castle at Afyonkarahisar
Date	Spring 1146
Location	modern-day Afyonkarahisar
Result	Byzantine victory

Belligerents
Byzantine Empire	Sultanate of Rum

Commanders and leaders
Manuel I Komnenos (WIA)	Unknown

Strength
Unknown	Unknown

The Battle of Acronis or Acroënus was the opening engagement of the punitive expedition of Manuel I Komnenos in 1146, during which the Byzantines surprised and engaged a Seljuk raiding force, ultimately achieving victory.

== Background ==
In spring (1145), Manuel aborted his first expedition due to an illness of his sister (Maria Komnene) or either being ill himself, upon learning of his withdrawal, the Sultanate of Rum led by Sultan Mesud I assumed that the byzantines were having internal problems which emboldened them to persistently launch border incursions and plundering raids within the newly secured border frontier, provoking and alarming Manuel to conduct a retaliatory expedition the following year.

== Battle ==
In the spring of 1146, Manuel mobilized a large force at the strategic base of Lopadion, after which he advanced to Akroinon. Here, the Emperor encountered a Seljuk raiding army which he engaged in a pitched battle. After fierce fighting, during which Manuel was wounded when a Seljuk arrow struck his foot, the Byzantines defeated the Seljuks and conducted a sharp pursuit of their retreating horsemen.

== Aftermath ==
With the path cleared, Manuel advanced on the fortified town of Philomelion; where he defeated the local garrison there capturing and sacking the city where he also resettled the remaining Christian Greek inhabitants to western Anatolia.
