= Gölyazı =

- Neighbourhood
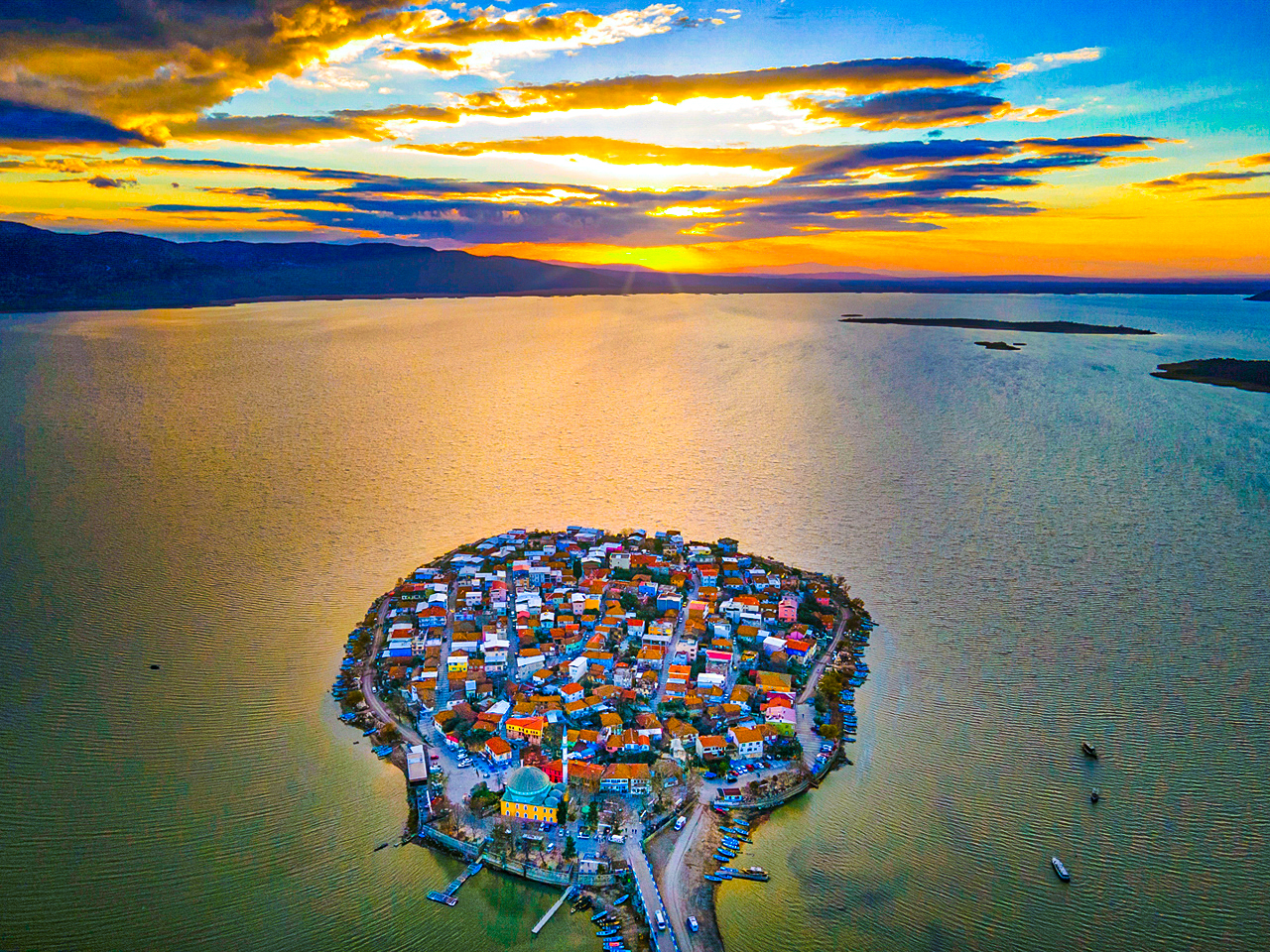
- Aerial view of Gölyazı and Lake Uluabat

- Location within Turkey Location within Marmara
- Coordinates: 40°09′58″N 28°40′42″E
- Country: Turkey
- Province: Bursa
- District: Nilüfer
- Population (2022): 1,271
- Time zone: UTC+3 (TRT)

Gölyazı is a neighbourhood in the municipality and district of Nilüfer, Bursa Province in Turkey. Its population is 1,271 (2022). It lies on a small peninsula on Lake Uluabat. It was an independent municipality until it was merged into the municipality of Nilüfer in 2008.

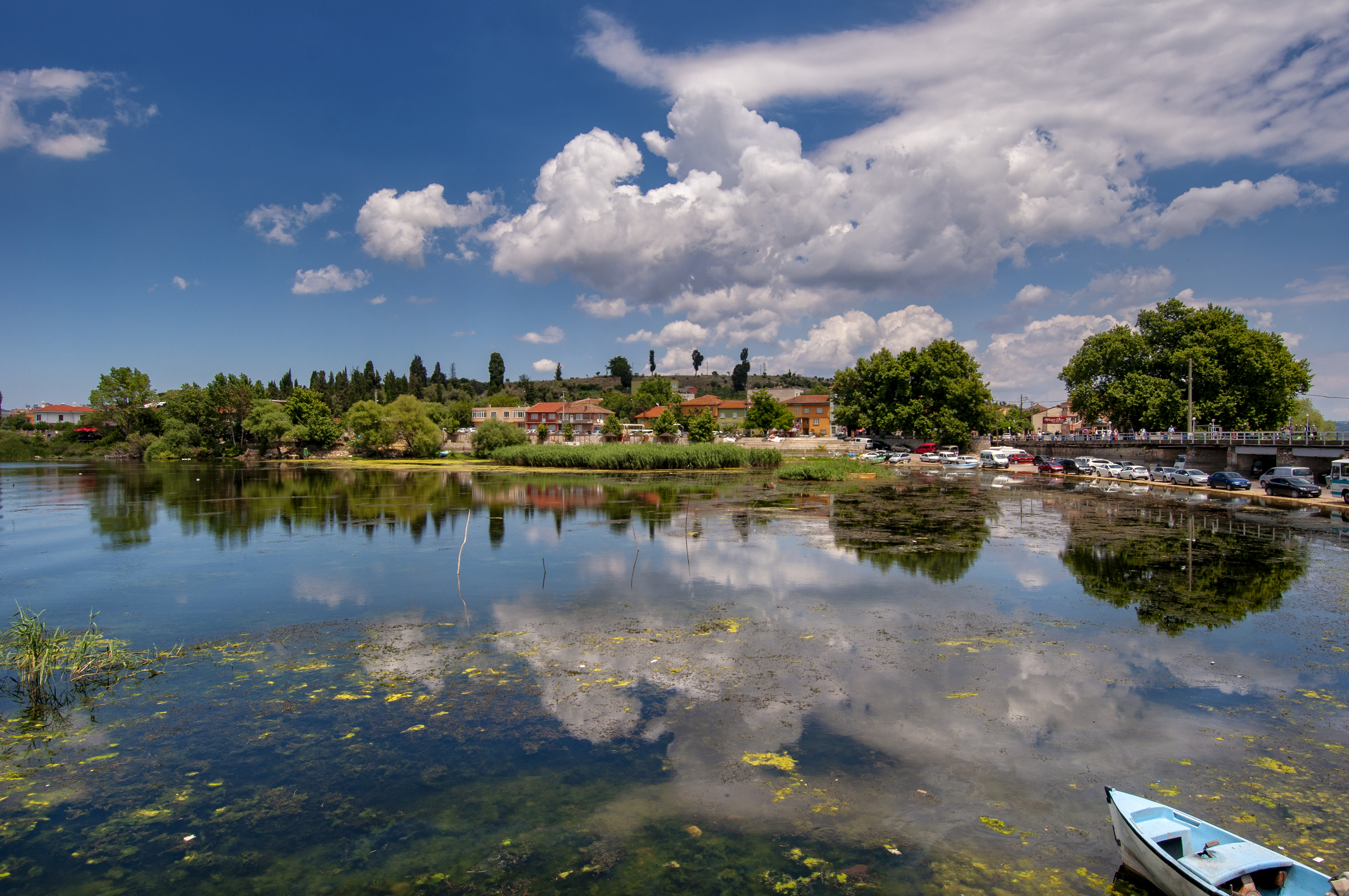

Gölyazı was founded by the Ancient Greeks. but remains of the Roman period are abundant.

Every year the town holds the Stork Festival. Until the 20th century, Greeks and Manavs lived together in the town. In ancient times it was known as Apolloniatis The name Gölyazı means Fisherwoman. The place has been also known as Apolyond or Apollonias.

Gölyazı is a settlement built on the ancient Greek city called Apollonia Ad Rhyndacum. The necropolis ruins of this city are on the hill called Zambak Tepe, close to the land.

== History ==
Possibly founded as a colony by Miletus, the antiquity of the city is supported by coins from as early as 450 BCE, which bear the anchor symbol of Apollo and which have been attributed by some scholars to this Apollonia. The city experienced prosperity under the Attalids during Hellenistic times.

The Roman Emperor Hadrian visited the city and in the Byzantine period, it belonged to the Diocese of Bithinya, then Nicomedia. During the Byzantine period, it was called Theotokia.

In 1302 the Ottoman king Osman I took refuge in the castle after the Battle of Bapheus but retreated.

The city had a sizeable Greek population before 1922 and the Greco-Turkish War (1919–1922). Following the episodes of the war and the retreat of the Greek army, Greek families abandoned the place to Greece and reallocated in many different places .

The name of the town was changed to Gölyazı during the Turkish Republic period (see also: Place name changes in Turkey).

== Ruins ==
The ruins of Gölyazı are 3.7 kilometers south of the highway. Some remains include:

- An ancient Roman highway.
- A sarcophagus and cover cut from the natural rock at the edge of the ancient road, in a mausoleum in 8.5 x 8.5 meters in size.
- The so-called "Stone Gate" at the narrowest part of the peninsula and city wall with thickness of 5 meters in some places.
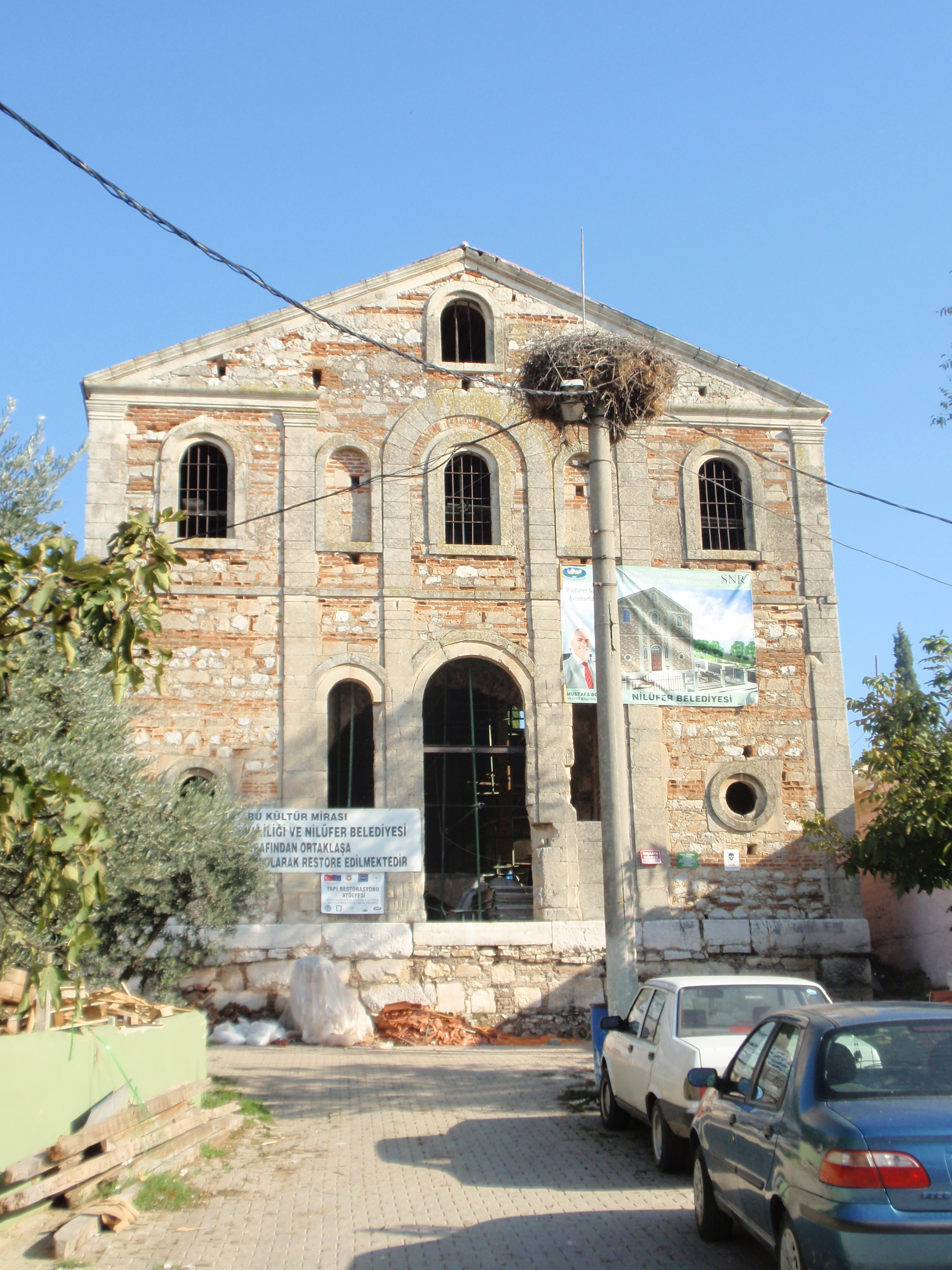
The St. Panteleimon Greek Church which is now fully renovated

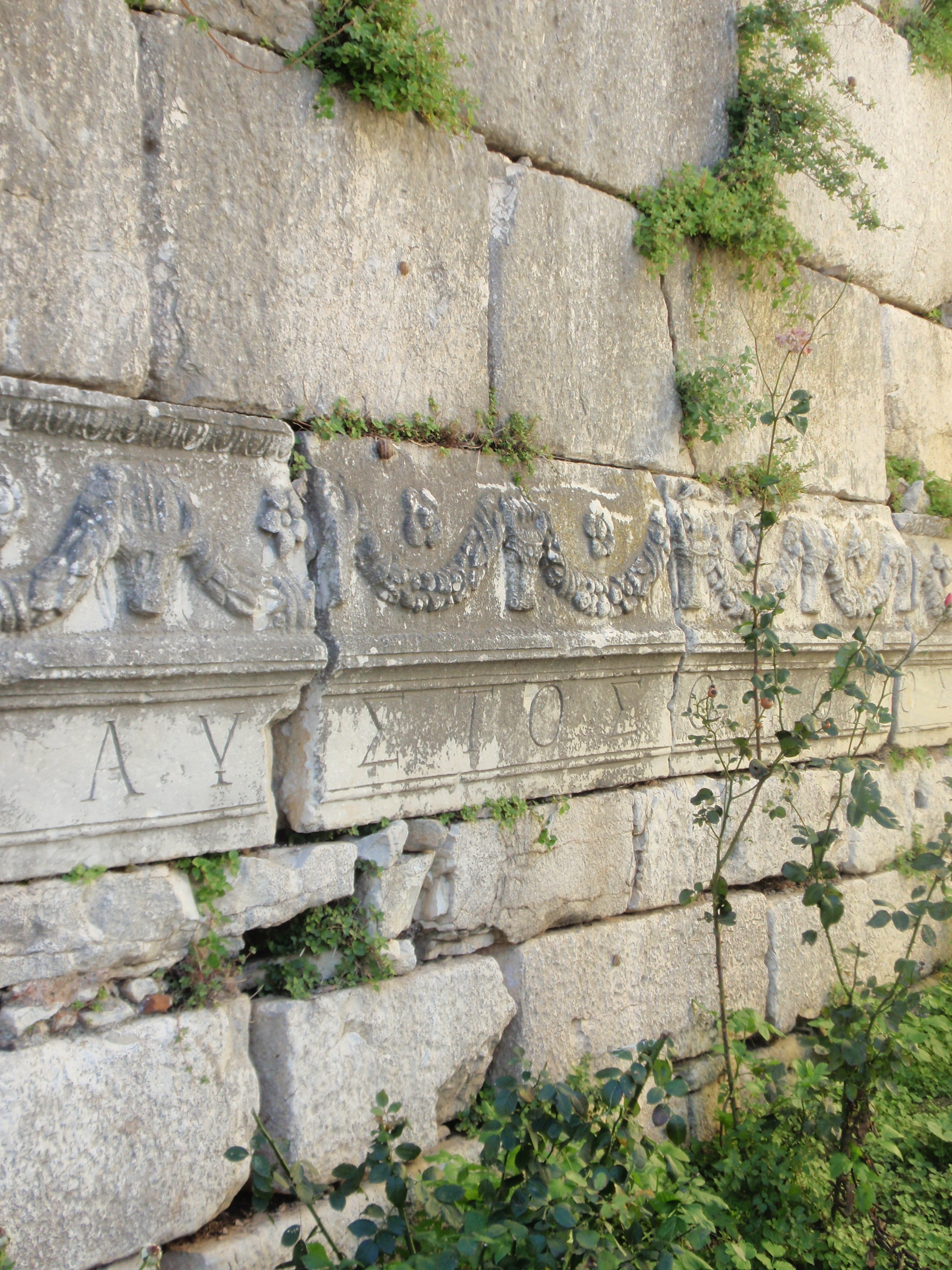
remains of the ancient city walls

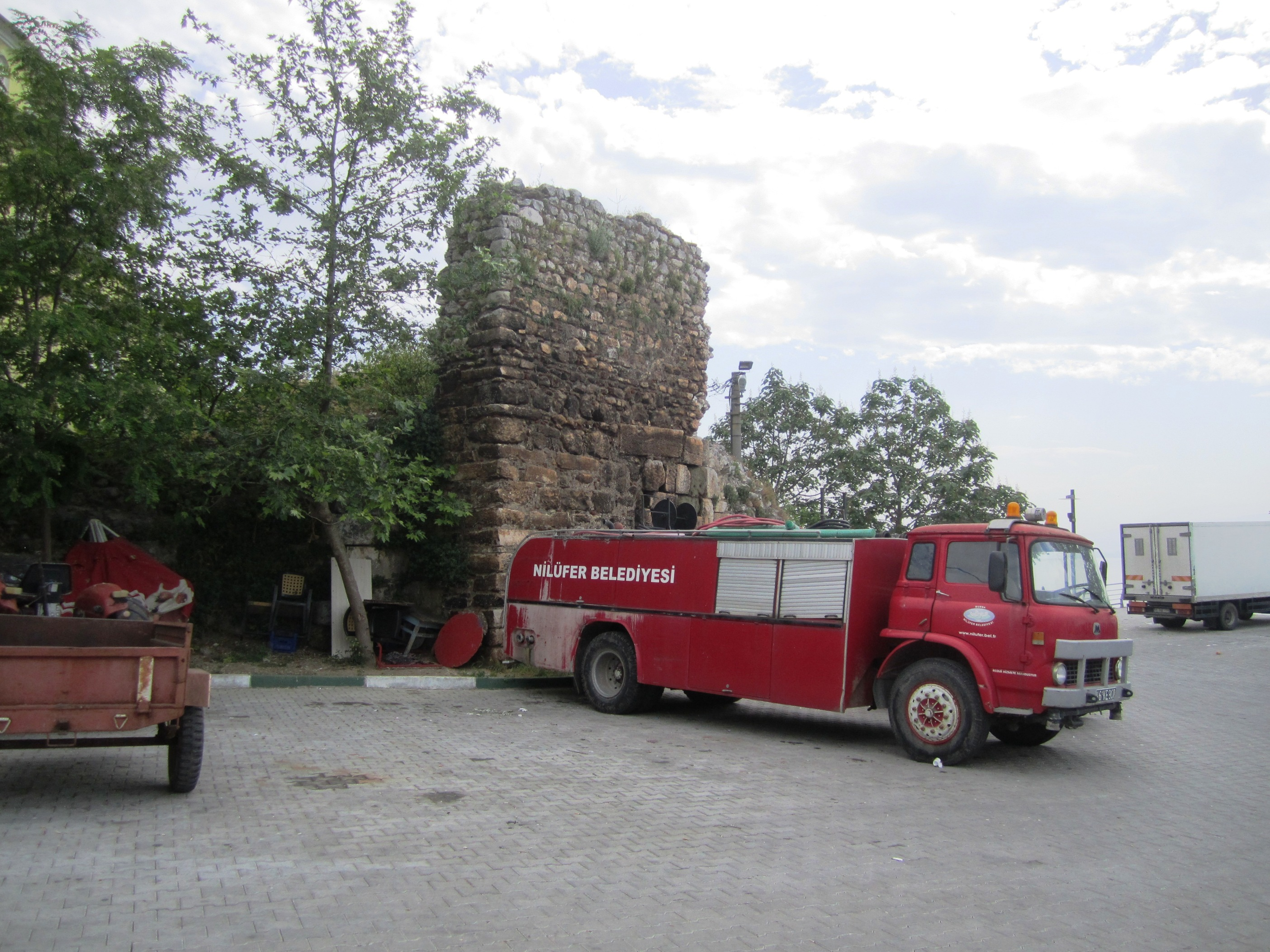
remains of the ancient city

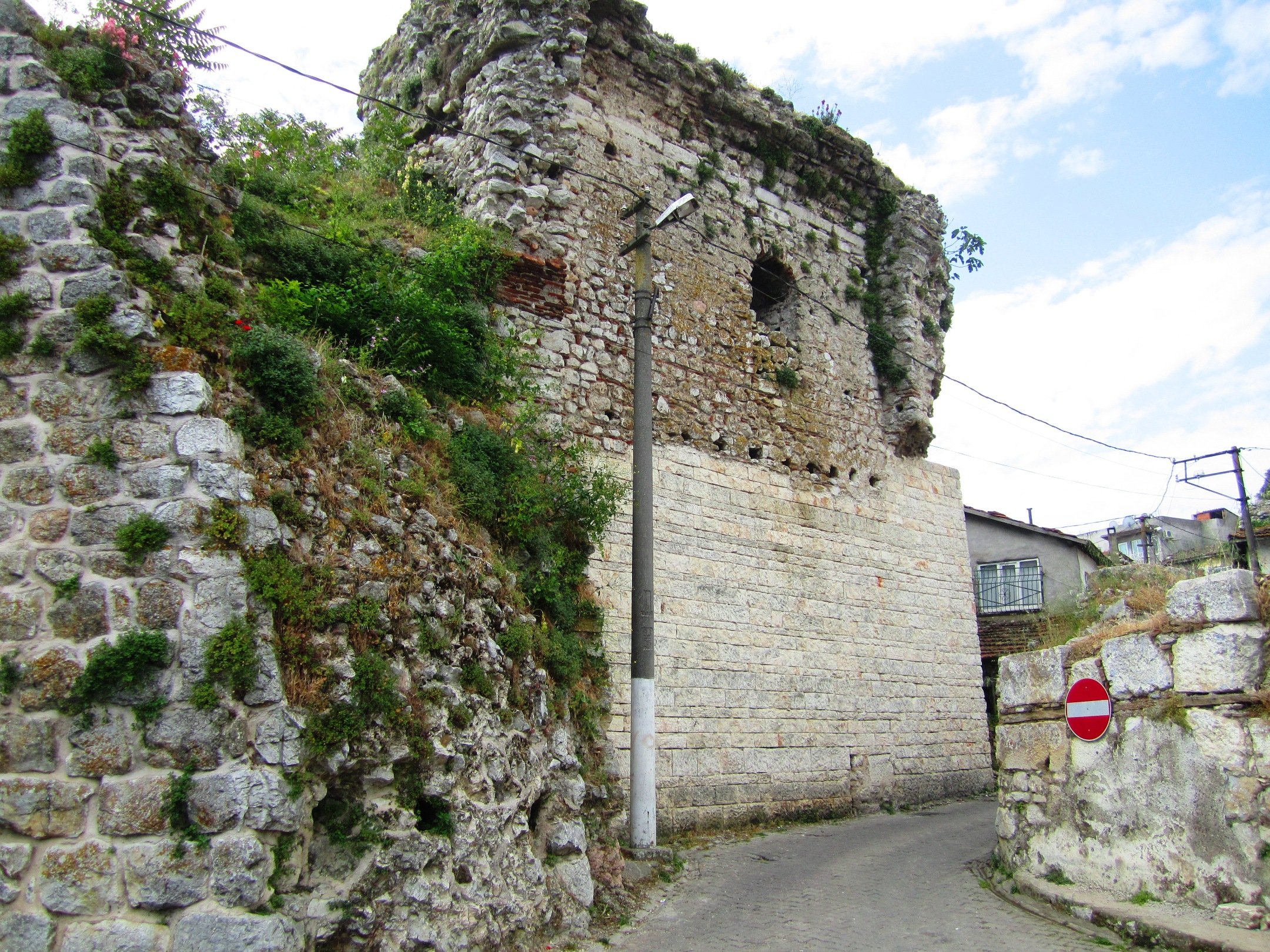
Gölyazi (Apollonia) ruins

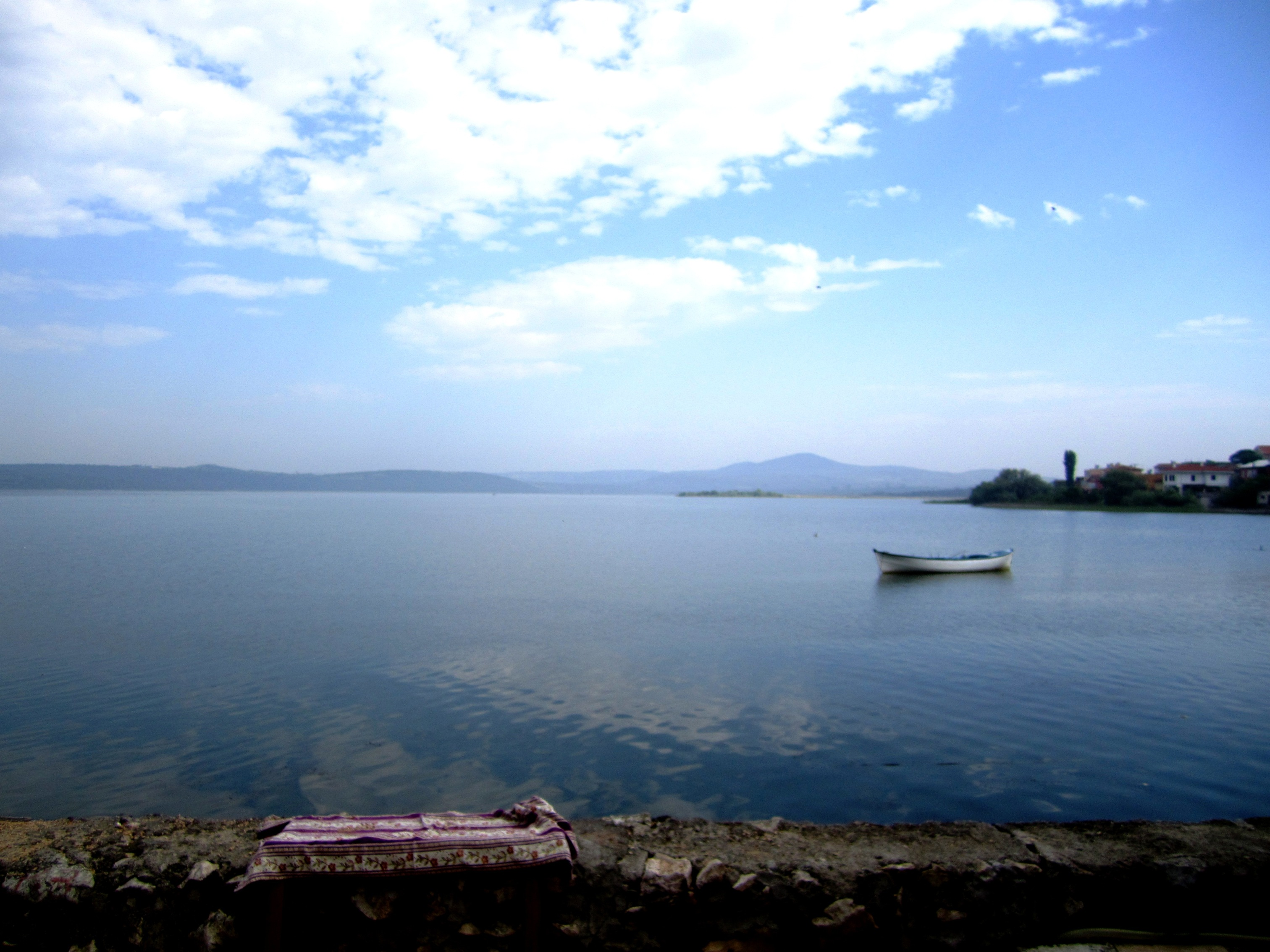
Lake Uluabat from Gölyazi

== See also ==
- Göl Yazı, 2017 book
