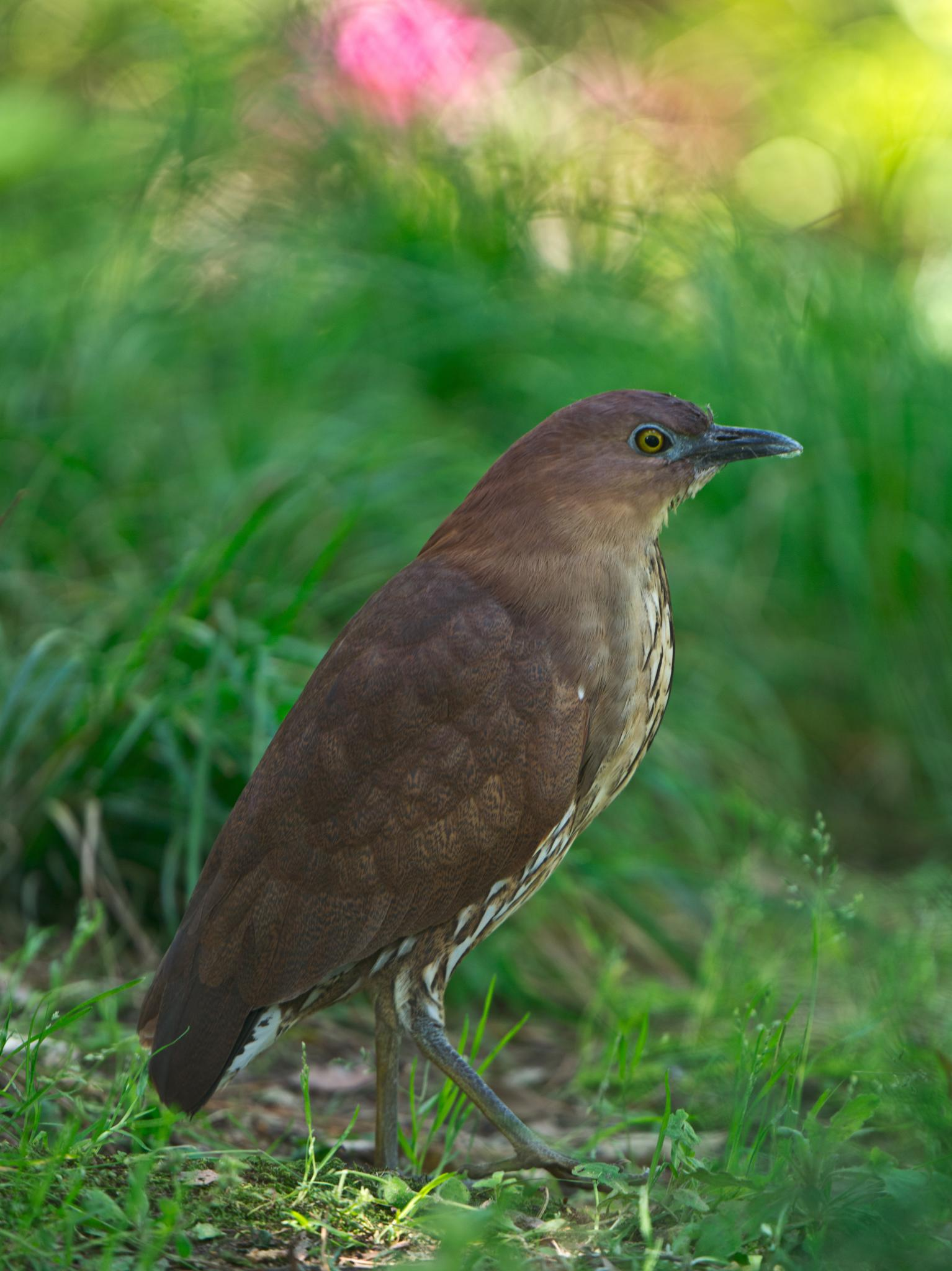

Conservation status
- Vulnerable (IUCN 3.1)

Scientific classification
- Kingdom: Animalia
- Phylum: Chordata
- Class: Aves
- Order: Pelecaniformes
- Family: Ardeidae
- Genus: Gorsachius
- Species: G. goisagi

Binomial name
- Gorsachius goisagi (Temminck, 1836)
- Distribution map

Synonyms
- Ardea goisagi Temminck, 1836

= Japanese night heron =

Species of bird

The Japanese night heron (Gorsachius goisagi) is a species of night heron found in East Asia. It breeds in Japan, and winters in the Philippines and Indonesia. It is also seen in the spring and summer in Korea and the Russian Far East.

The Japanese night heron prefers dense, damp forest, in both its breeding and winter ranges. Common until the 1970s, this species is threatened by deforestation in its summer and winter ranges for timber and farmland. Other documented threats include the introduction of the Siberian weasel (Mustela sibirica) in its breeding range and nest predation by crows, due to the increasing crow populations. The current population is estimated at less than 1,000 mature individuals. Accordingly, the Japanese night heron is marked as a protected species in Japan and Hong Kong.

Future actions proposed to conserve this species include surveying its breeding habits throughout Japan and the Philippines, protecting its habitat, creating more public interest and awareness in the bird, and stopping invasive species from competing with it.

== Taxonomy ==
The Japanese night heron was formally described in 1835 by Dutch zoologist Coenraad Jacob Temminck under the binomial name Nycticorax goisagri. He specified the type locality as Japan. The species is now placed together with the Malayan night heron in the genus Gorsachius that was introduced in 1855 by the French naturalist Charles Lucien Bonaparte. The genus name is based on the specific epithet, goisagi, which comes from the Japanese word goi-sagi for the black-crowned night heron.

== Description ==
The Japanese night heron's wingspan ranges between 43 and 47 centimeters, and the colors of the plumage vary between adult and juvenile herons. In adult herons, the head and neck feathers are russet in color and the wings' feathers are dark-brown in color. In juvenile herons, the feathers on the head are more black in color than russet, while the feathers on the wings are lighter in color than those of the adult. Both juvenile and adult herons share a wide beak and yellow skin on the outer layer of their eyes. A unique feature of the Japanese night heron is the dense, black lines that irregularly go down the covert feathers of its wings.

== Distribution and habitat ==
The Japanese night heron typically inhabits dense, coniferous and broad-leaved forests on hills and low mountains in close proximity to bodies of water, i.e. rivers and streams. This habitat seems to be consistent between the breeding and non-breeding ranges. Generally, the altitudinal range of the Japanese night heron is between 50 and 240 meters. However, it has been reported at heights above 1,000 meters in Japan, where the habitat is scarce, and the Philippines. During the winter, the heron shelters in dark and deeply shaded forests, which are near water and can be as elevated as 2,400 meters.

=== Migration ===
The Japanese night heron is usually found in the Philippines during the winter, but it can also be found in other East Asian countries like Korea, southern China, Taiwan, and Russia. It arrives at its breeding grounds in Japan between March and June, and it leaves between September and November for the Philippines. The Japanese night heron tends to migrate in a mixed flock of more than 1,000 other herons, including the black-crowned night heron. The Japanese night heron is a highly migratory species and has some dispersal tendencies. During its migration, it has been reported to sometimes overshoot its destination, the Philippines, and arrive at Indonesia and Palau instead.

== Behaviour and ecology ==
=== Food and feeding ===
The Japanese night heron feeds at dusk, solitarily or in small groups, rarely in the open. Its diet consists of soil animals on the forest floor, i.e. earthworms, snails, and small insects. The heron has been known to use its thick beak to dig earthworms and land snails out of the ground. The heron seems to selectively feed on more mature snails in order to avoid accidentally digesting the softer shells of immature snails. Although most of its nutrition comes from the forest floor, the heron hunts crustaceans and small fish in shallow water along the shorelines of swamps and rice paddies.

=== Breeding ===
There has only been one report of the Japanese night heron breeding in Taiwan. Normally, it breeds in Japan from May to July, depending on when it arrives at the breeding grounds. The heron nests up to 20 meters high in tall trees, such as cedar, cypress, and oak trees. It does so alone, rarely in close proximity to another heron for 17 to 20 days. The flimsy nests are made out of sticks stacked on top of each other with an abundance of leaves, laid horizontally on a branch. Eggs are laid from 3 to 5 per breeding season. The chicks do not hatch on the same day, because incubation starts for each egg when it is laid. When the chicks have been hatched for three days, the parents leave for periods that range from 7 to 9 hours to feed the chicks. After 20 days, the parents return once or twice a day, gradually returning more frequently until the newly hatched herons leave the nest after 35 to 37 days.

== Threats ==
The largest danger to the Japanese night heron is the deforestation of rural, lowland forests. Unchecked farmland development has particularly affected the heron's breeding and feeding ranges, adversely affecting its usual nesting habits. In addition, the night heron's nests fall within the predatory niche of the rapidly increasing crow population in the area. Since 1901, when Siberian weasels were introduced to Hokkaido, the Japanese night heron has also faced both competition and predation from Siberian weasels, which are active hunters of the fish and insects that the heron preys on. As a result, the Japanese night heron has seen a dramatic decline in the wild.

== Conservation ==
The Japanese night heron is very rare, because of its restricted breeding area. The population of the heron has decreased down to a few thousand within the last decade. For this reason, the Japanese night heron is legally protected by Japanese and Hong Kong Laws, and many programs have been proposed to counteract/steady the decline and create a revitalization of the species. The conservation acts propose public awareness, further study of the heron's home range within the seasons of breeding and inactivity, and control the sale of specimens. The control and inhibition of invasive species that impact the heron are also being addressed.

== See also ==
- Night heron
- List of birds of Japan
