= Göl Yazı =

2017 book

- Author: Enis Batur
- Language: Turkish
- Publisher: Sel Yayıncılık
- Publication date: November 2017
- Publication place: Turkey
- Pages: 151
- ISBN: 978-9-755-70901-7

Göl Yazı, published in 2017, is a book by Turkish author Enis Batur.

It is a work that contains information and texts about Bursa and Lake Apolyont, Gölyazı, blending factual and fictional elements. The narrative brings together people who have lived in these locations and their encounters, relationships, and associations with islands and peninsulas in various lakes. The author explores the web of relationships within the human-time-space triangle, drawing inspiration from Ahmet Haşim's travel notes on a trip to Bursa.

The book was published with the subtitles Çapraz İlişkiler Kafesi and Katır Metin. The back cover describes it as an anti-novel.

It emerged from the author's writings during his stay at the Writer's House on the shores of Lake Apolyont, invited by the Nilüfer Municipality. The book was awarded the 2018 Yunus Nadi Novel Prize. The selection committee described it as "the novel of literary passion."

== Awards ==
- 2018 Yunus Nadi award
