= Apollonia ad Rhyndacum =

Archeological site in Turkey

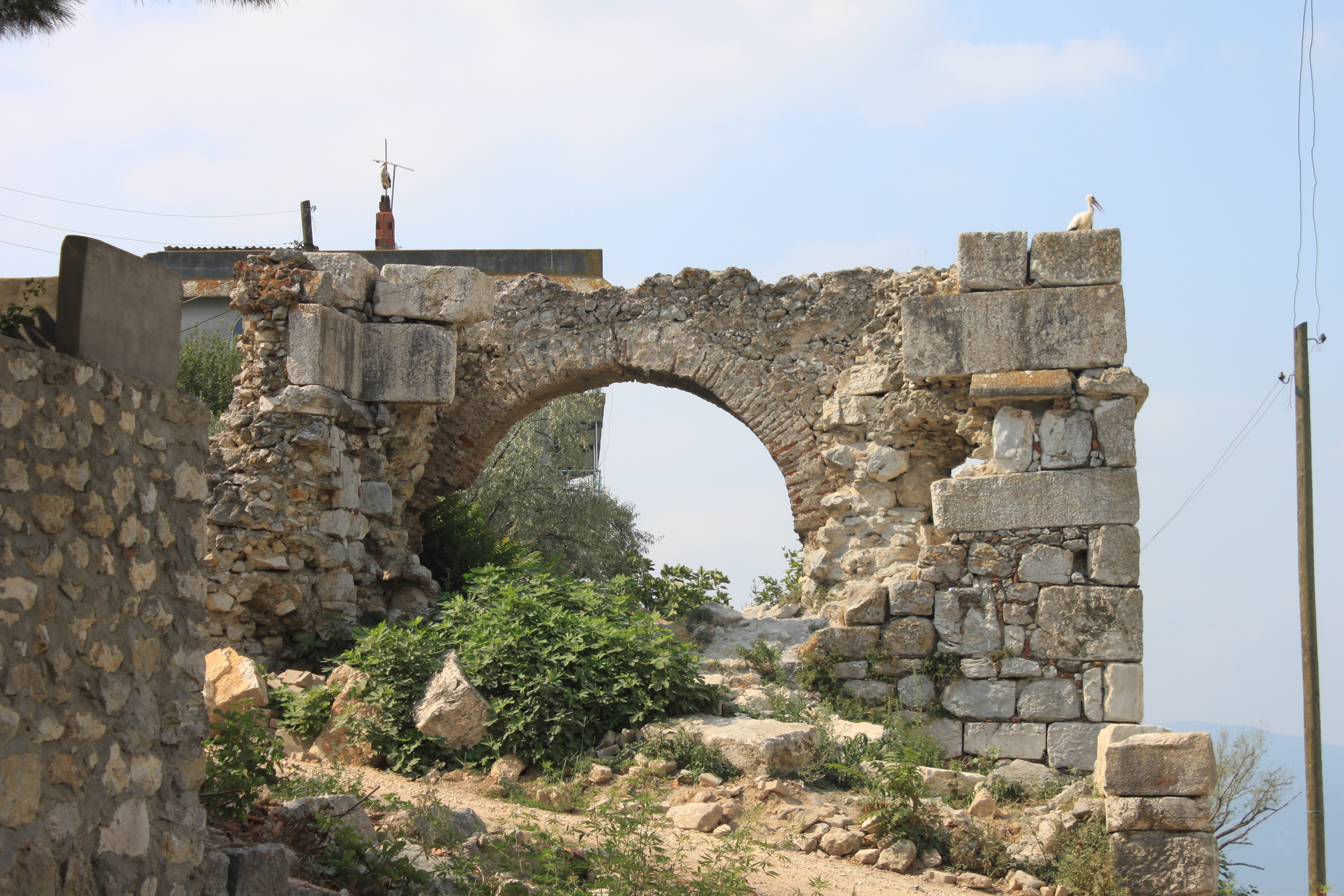
- Apollonia ad Rhyndacum, gate of the Byzantine castle on Saint George hill

- Location within Turkey
- 40°10′10″N 28°40′57″E
- Cultures: Ancient Greece, Byzantine Empire
- Location: Turkey
- Region: Bursa Province

Apollonia or Apollonia-on-the-Rhyndacus (Ancient Greek: Ἀπολλωνία ἐπὶ Ῥυνδακῷ, Apollōnía épì Ryndakō; Latin: Apollonia ad Rhyndacum) was an ancient town opposite the delta of the Rhyndacus river in northwestern Anatolia and corresponds today to the town of Gölyazı.

== Location ==
Nine cities known as Apollonia were built during antiquity in Anatolia. Strabo placed Apollonia-on-the-Rhyndacus in Mysia, causing some to misidentify Uluabat as Apollonia on the western shore of Lake Uluabat. However, the site is actually the promontory tombolo on the northeastern shore, near modern Gölyazı. Lake Uluabat extends from east to west and is studded with several islands and peninsulas, on one of which the city of Apollonia was built. The name of “Apollonia ad Rhyndacum” was likely chosen in order to differentiate from the other cities in the antiquity with reference to the stream “Rhyndacus (Adranos)” located close to the city and stemming from Aizanoi (Çavdarhisar).

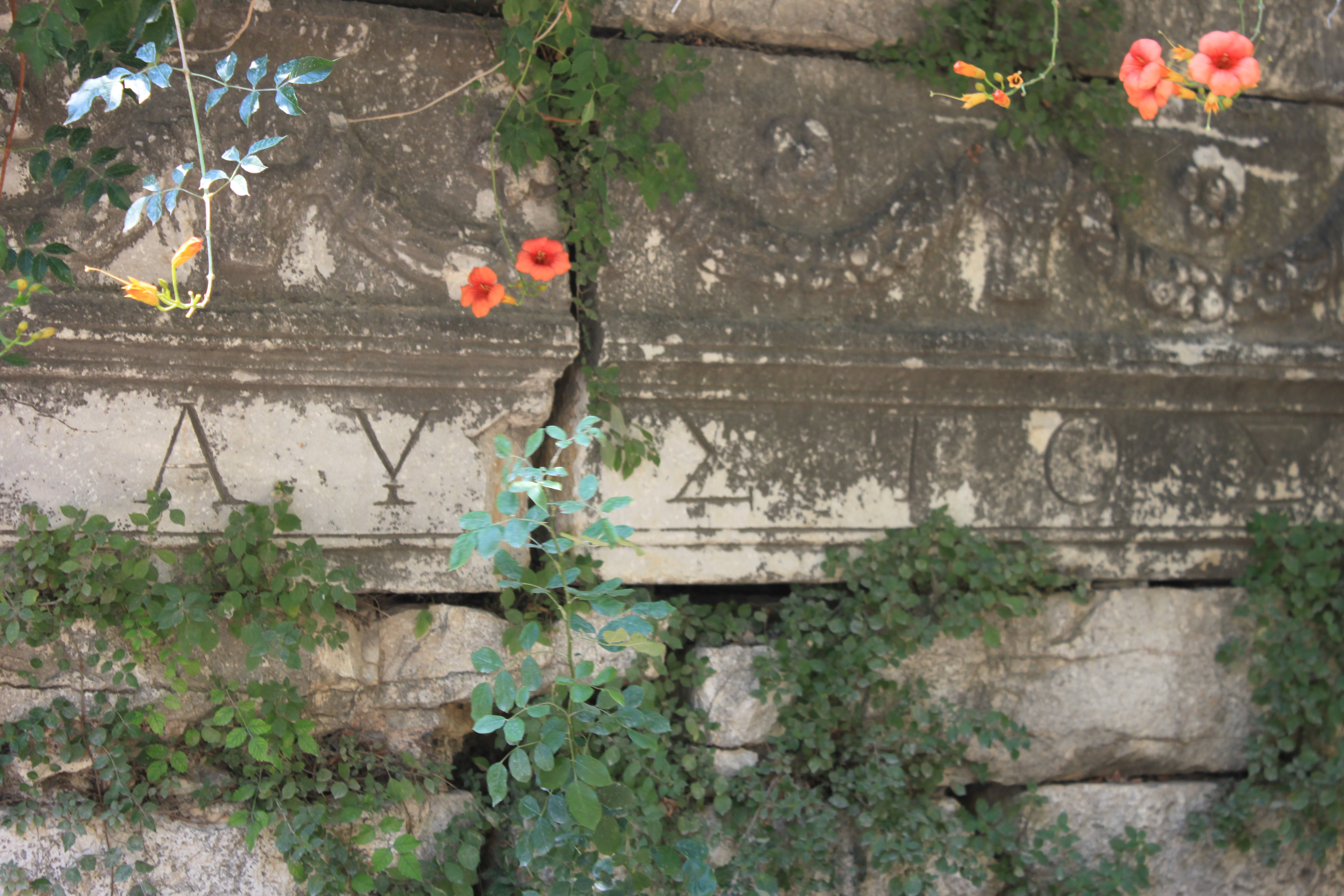
Apollonia ad Rhyndacum, spolia in the Byzantine castle wall, 7th century.

== History ==
Apollonia ad Rhyndacum is one of many ancient Greek cities that bear the name of Apollo. Inhabitants of Apollonia believed that their original colony had been founded by Miletus under the auspices of Apollo of Didyma, so Apollo was its archegetes. The city experienced prosperity under the Attalids during Hellenistic times.

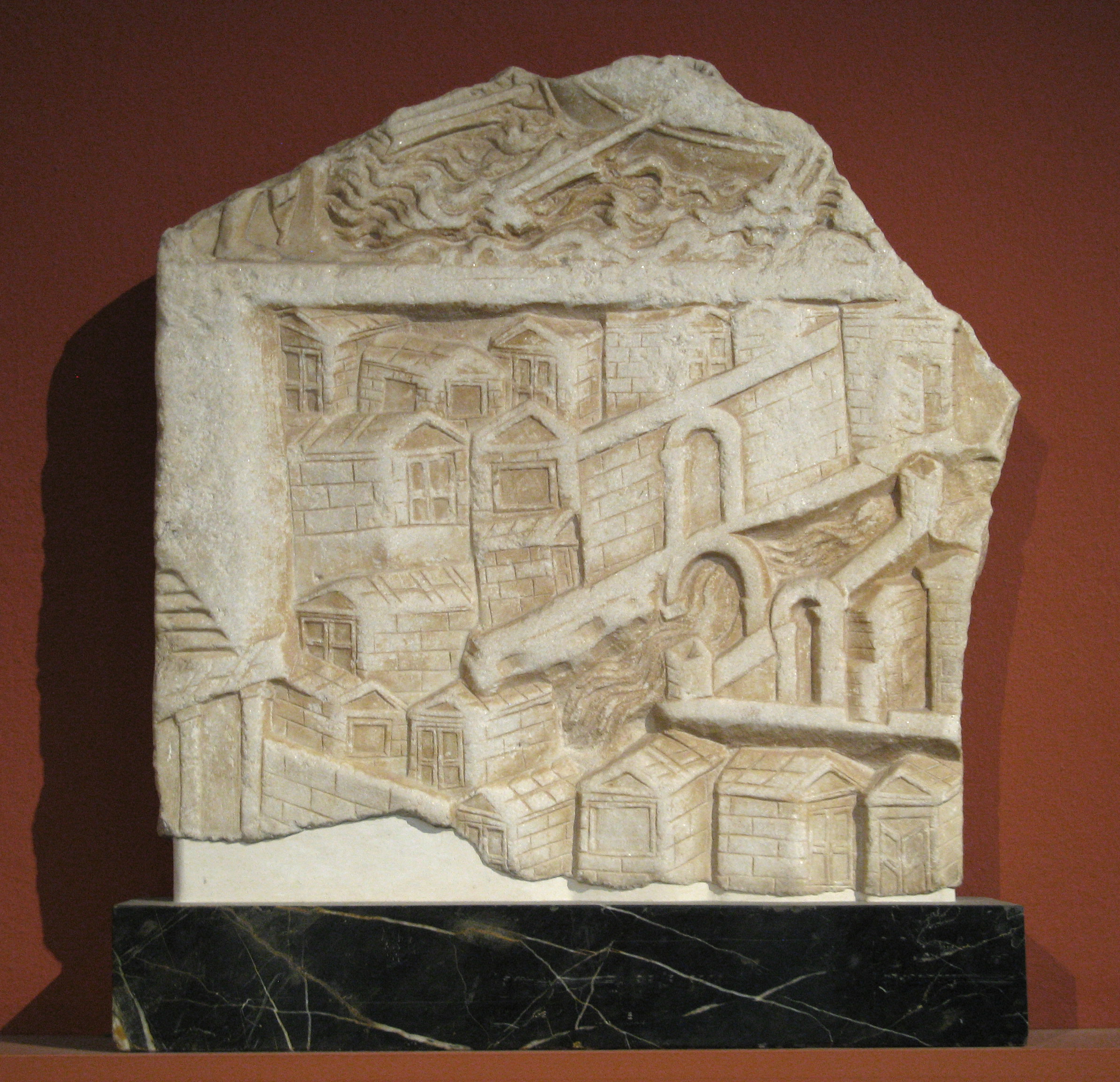
Roman relief from Apollonia ad Rhyndacum, 2nd century, now in the Antikensammlung Berlin

It is thought that the neighbouring islet known today as Kız Ada was a sacred area of Apollo during antiquity. After the construction of the temple in the name of preservative God of the city, head of Apollo, kithara, plectron and Apollo Sauroctonus figure in the temple were used from Hellenistic Era to the late Roman Empire Period. Usage of crawfish figure continued its prevalence while depiction of Gorgon head gradually decreased. Coins minted in the town display various deities, next to the eponymous Apollo other deities such as Zeus or Demeter during the Hellenistic period and Artemis during later Roman times. A necropolis outside the town contains graves from the Hellenistic to the Byzantine period.

The city became later part of the Byzantine Empire and was a suffragan bishopric under the jurisdiction of the metropolitan of Nicomedia. After the Turkmen invasion of Anatolia in the 1070s, a Turkmen warlord named Elchanes took control of Apollonia and of nearby Kyzikos around the year 1084. The Byzantine Emperor Alexios I Komnenos sent twice expeditions against Elchanes and the second expedition under Constantinos Opos was successful in persuading the warlord by generous payments to give up his holdings. In 1113 a Seljuk army from Iran, that numbered around 40,000–50,000 men, devastated Apollonia and the neighbouring regions.

The town came under Ottoman control in 1342. After the fall of the Ottoman Empire, the town was renamed to Gölyazı in the new republic.

== See also ==
- List of ancient Greek cities
