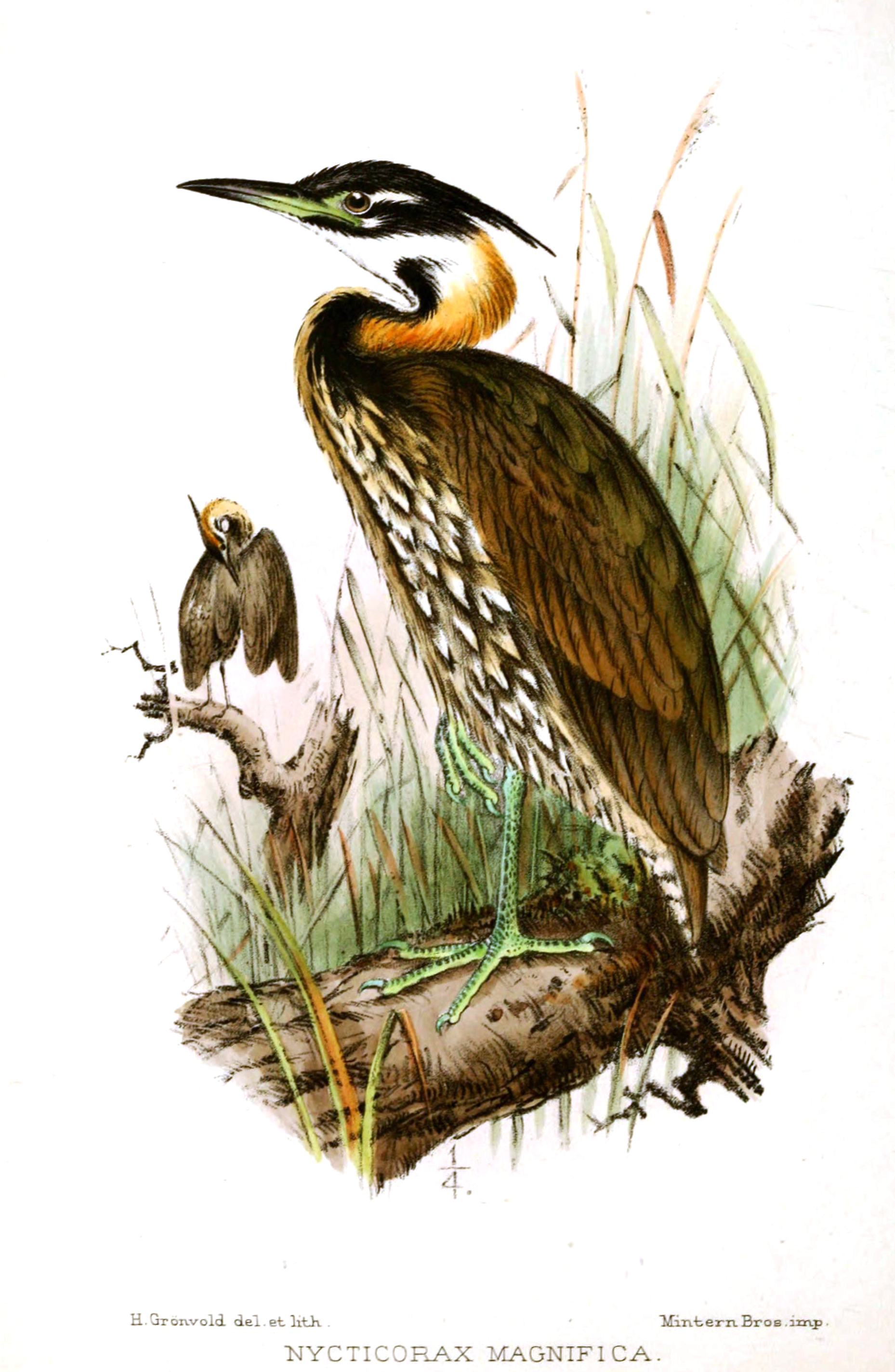

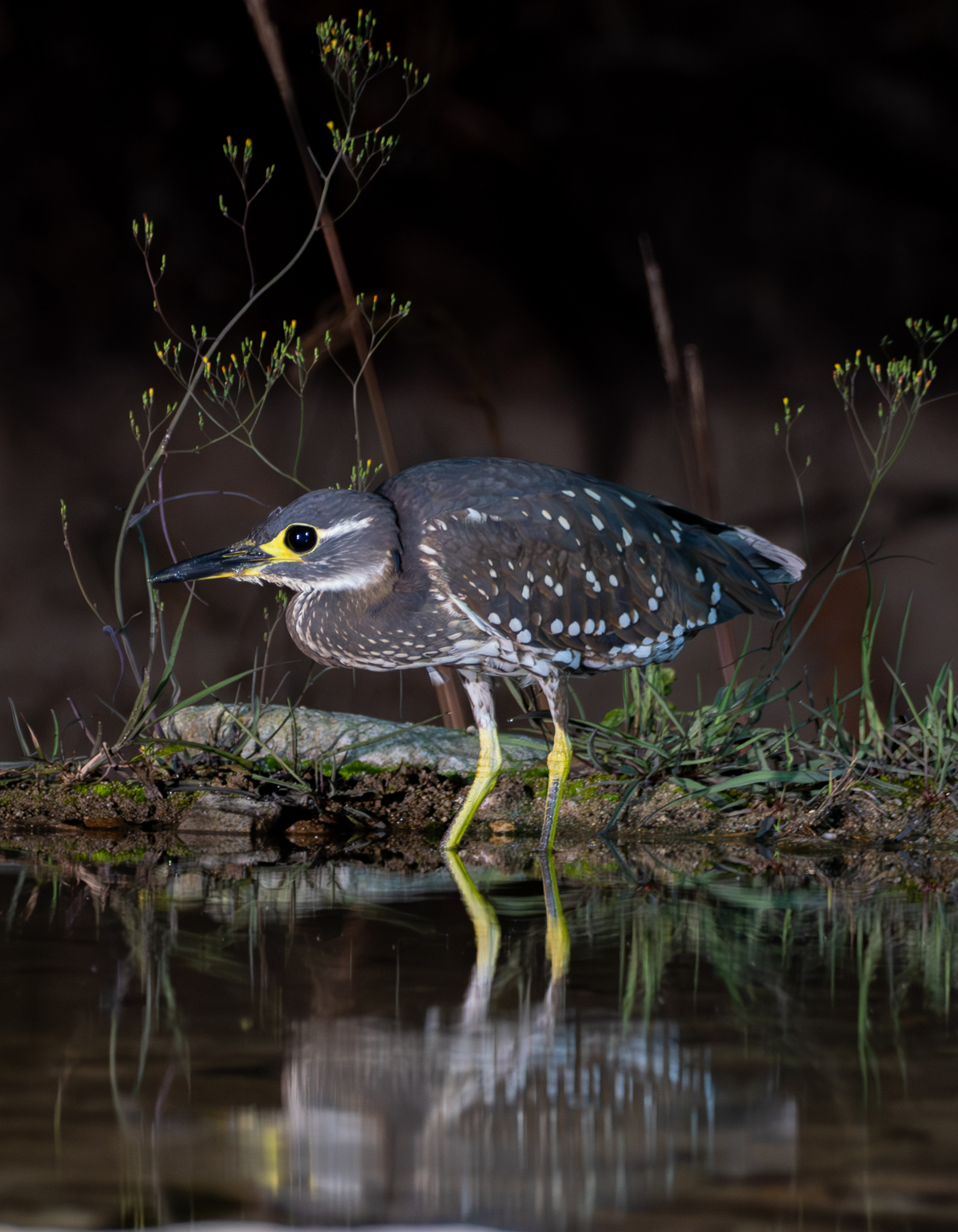
- A subadult

Conservation status
- Near Threatened (IUCN 3.1)

Scientific classification
- Kingdom: Animalia
- Phylum: Chordata
- Class: Aves
- Order: Pelecaniformes
- Family: Ardeidae
- Genus: Oroanassa; Peters, JL, 1930
- Species: O. magnifica

Binomial name
- Oroanassa magnifica (Ogilvie-Grant, 1899)

Synonyms
- Nycticorax magnifica Ogilvie-Grant, 1899; Nycticorax magnificus Ogilvie-Grant, 1899; Gorsachius magnificus (Ogilvie-Grant, 1899)

= White-eared night heron =

Species of bird

The white-eared night heron (Oroanassa magnifica) is a species of heron in the family Ardeidae. It was once thought to be only found in southern China and in northern Vietnam. However, its range is actually significantly larger as in the 2010s and 2020s has been recently discovered in Cambodia, India and Bangladesh.

In 2017, it was camera-trapped in the Cardamom Mountains. In 2018, it was also reported in Valmiki National Park, India and in 2025, it was once again camera-trapped in Namdapha National Park, India. It was discovered in the Sundarbans in Bangladesh in 2022. It is threatened by habitat loss and habitat fragmentation.

== Taxonomy ==
The white-eared night heron was collected in Hainan by John Whitehead. It was described as Nycticorax magnifica by William Robert Ogilvie-Grant in 1899. The species is monotypic.

== Description ==
The length is 54–56 cm (21–22 in). The male is mostly blackish-brown. The neck-sides are chestnut. The lores are yellow, and the beak is black. The eyes are yellow-orange. The head and nape are blackish. The postocular stripes and throat are white. The underparts are brown, with white streaks. The tarsi are green. The female is similar to the male, but its head and neck are less distinctly patterned. The female also has whitish streaks on its back and wings. The juvenile is similar to the female, but has a browner plumage and buff spots.

== Distribution and habitat ==
This heron is found in southern China, India and northern Vietnam. Its range size is estimated at 2,180,000 km^{2} (840,000 sq mi). By 2001, the species had only been recorded from about 20 localities; in the ten years from 2001 to 2011, surveys discovered it in more than 30 localities, making its known range much larger. Its natural habitat is subtropical or tropical forests and rivers. It has also been found in human-modified habitats.

== Behaviour and ecology ==
Like other night herons, this species is mostly nocturnal. It feeds on fish, shrimps and invertebrates. Its territorial call is a deep, raspy whoaa, lasting about 0.3 seconds and repeated every 5–15 seconds. Breeding has been recorded in both Vietnam and China. The clutch size is 3–5 eggs. In China, hatching has been observed in May, with an incubation period of about 25 days. In Vietnam, fledging has been observed in late April. Breeding seems to occur earlier in Vietnam than in China. The nest is in the shape of a circular tray. A study found that fledging occurred more than two months after hatching, longer than most other species of heron.

== Status and conservation ==
The IUCN Red List listed the white-eared night heron as an endangered species from 2000 – 2025, following its downlisting from Critically Endangered in 2000. These classifications were due to a small estimated range and population. The species has become much better studied in the 21st century, with new records across India, Cambodia, and Bangladesh; its population (1,500 – 15,000 mature individuals) and range are now estimated to be considerably larger than previously thought. Because of this, the white-eared night heron was downlisted to Near Threatened in 2025.

It is threatened by deforestation, hunting, overfishing and water pollution. It has been discovered in many new localities, but the population is probably declining because of the threats. The species is listed as a Class II protected species in China. It occurs in protected areas in China and Vietnam, such as the Chebaling National Nature Reserve and Ba Be National Park.
