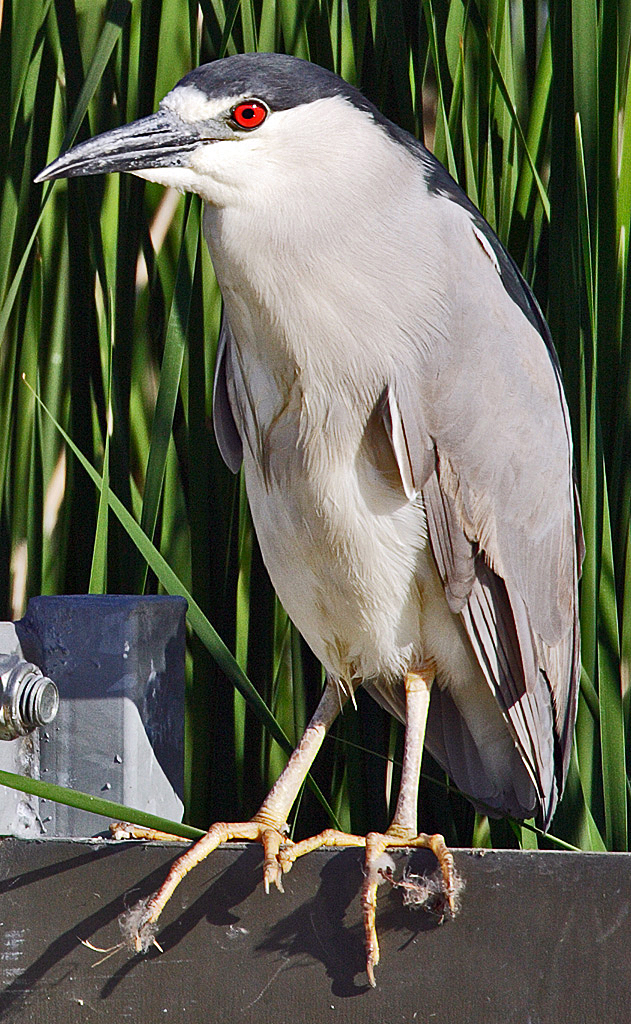
- Black-crowned night heron, Nycticorax nycticorax

Scientific classification
- Kingdom: Animalia
- Phylum: Chordata
- Class: Aves
- Order: Pelecaniformes
- Family: Ardeidae
- Subfamily: Ardeinae

Genera
- Gorsachius; Nyctanassa; Nycticorax

= Night heron =

Common name for various birds

The night herons are medium-sized herons, 58–65 cm, in the genera Nycticorax, Nyctanassa, and Gorsachius. The genus name Nycticorax derives from the Greek for "night raven" and refers to the largely nocturnal feeding habits of this group of birds, and the croaking crow-like, almost bark-like, call of the best known species, the black-crowned night heron.

== Description ==
Adults are short-necked, short-legged, and stout herons with a primarily brown or grey plumage, and, in most, a black crown. Young birds are brown, flecked with white. At least some of the extinct Mascarenes taxa appear to have retained this juvenile plumage in adult birds.

== Breeding ==
Night herons nest alone or in colonies, on platforms of sticks in a group of trees, or on the ground in protected locations such as islands or reedbeds. 3–8 eggs are laid.

== Diet ==
Night herons stand still at the water's edge and wait to ambush prey, mainly at night. They primarily eat small fish, crustaceans, frogs, aquatic insects, and small mammals. During the day, they rest in trees or bushes.

== Taxonomy ==
There are six extant species. The genus Nycticorax has suffered more than any other Pelecaniformes genus from extinction, mainly because of their capability to colonize small, predator-free oceanic islands, and a tendency to evolve towards flightlessness.

=== Genera ===
- Nyctanassa
- Nycticorax
- Gorsachius
- Oroanassa

== Distribution and habitat ==
Night herons are found on every continent except Antarctica. Night herons in Europe breed mainly in southern and southeastern Europe and migrate across the Sahara to winter in central and west Africa.

== Gallery ==
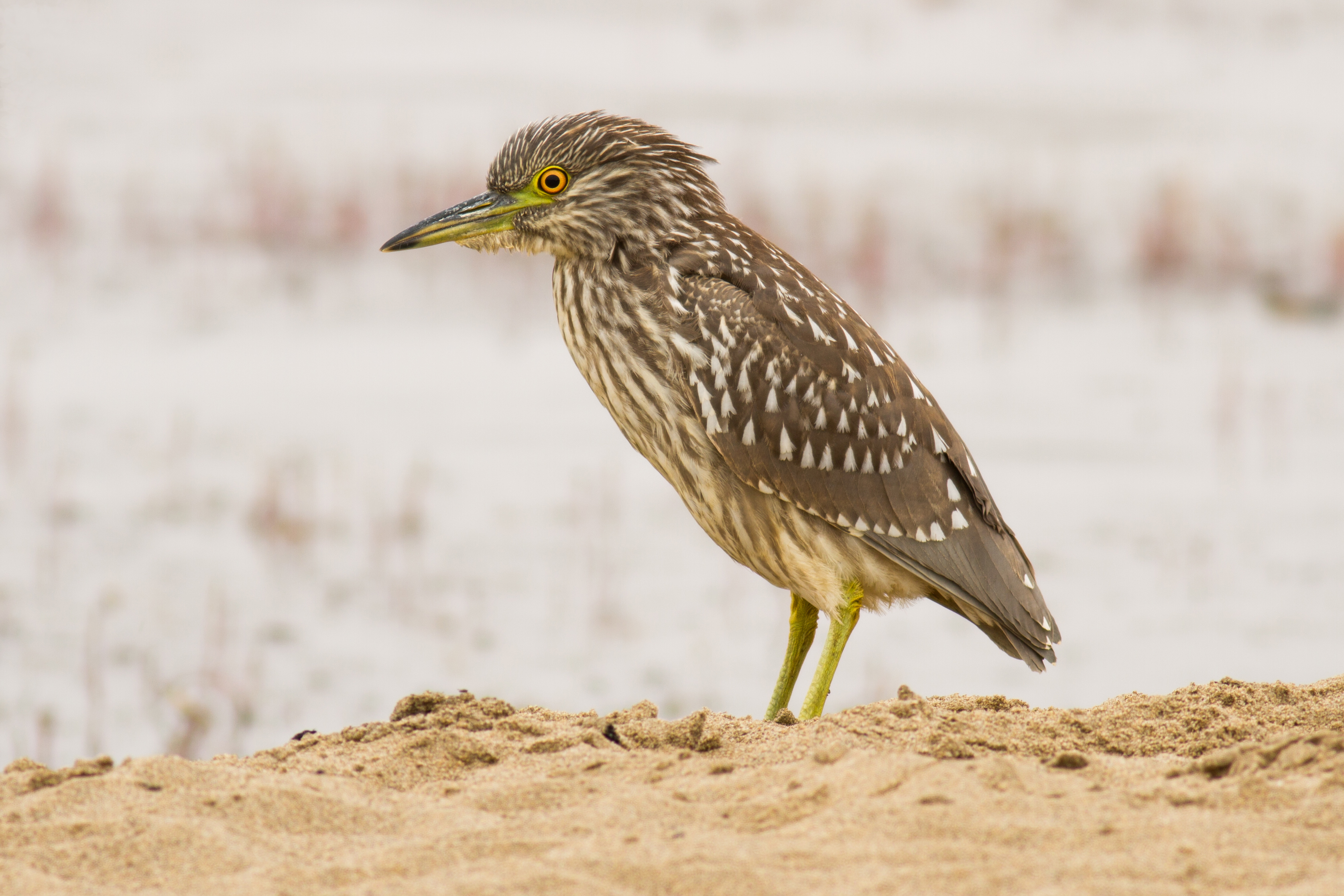
Juvenile black-crowned night heron (Nycticorax nycticorax) at Point Reyes National Seashore, California

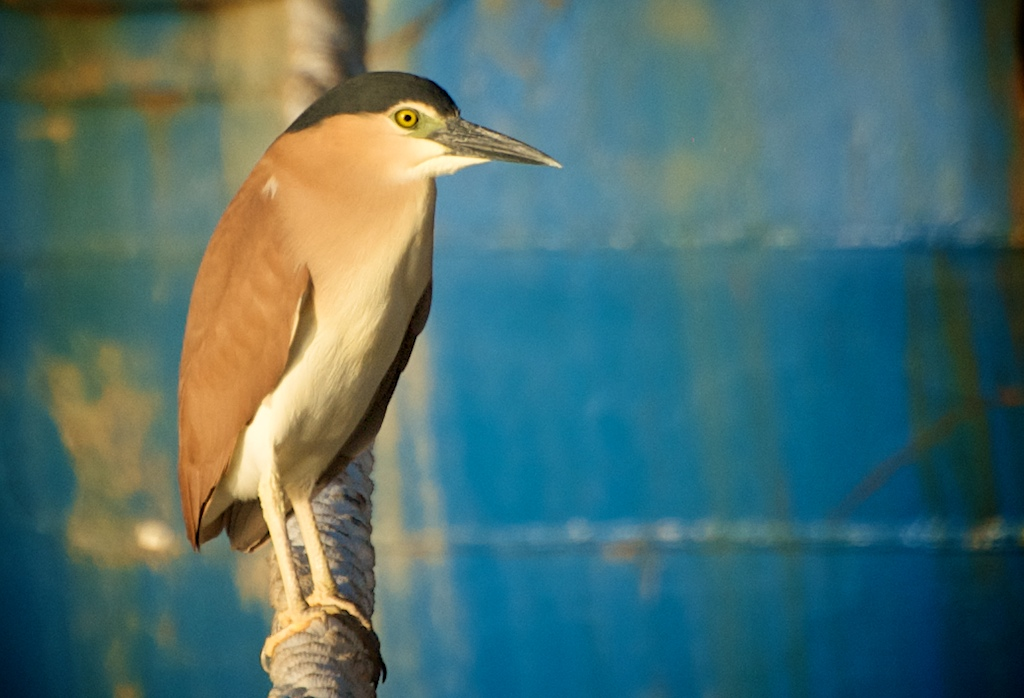
Nankeen or rufous night heron (Nycticorax caledonicus) at Fremantle Harbour, Western Australia

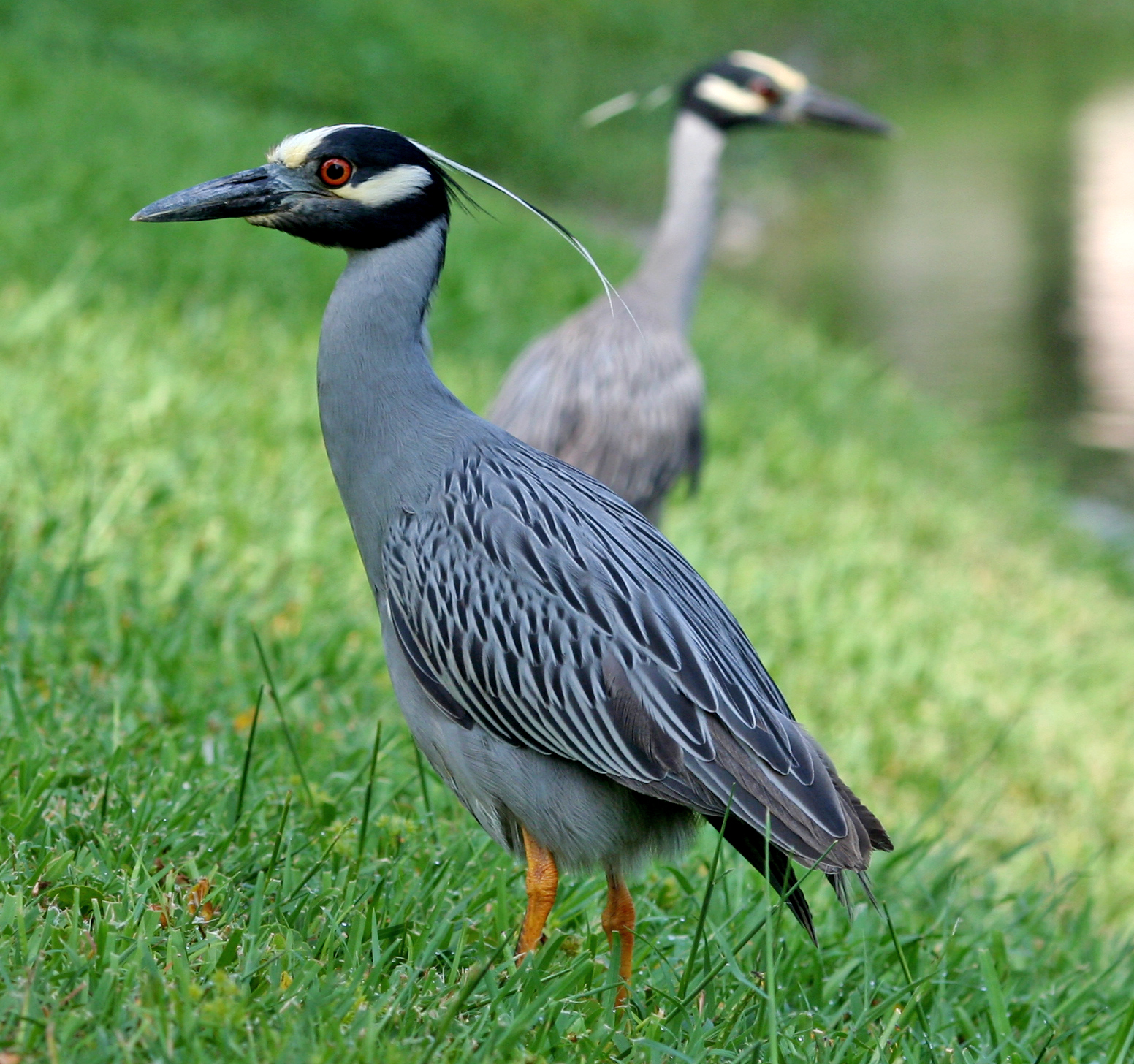
Yellow-crowned night heron (Nyctanassa violacea) in Florida

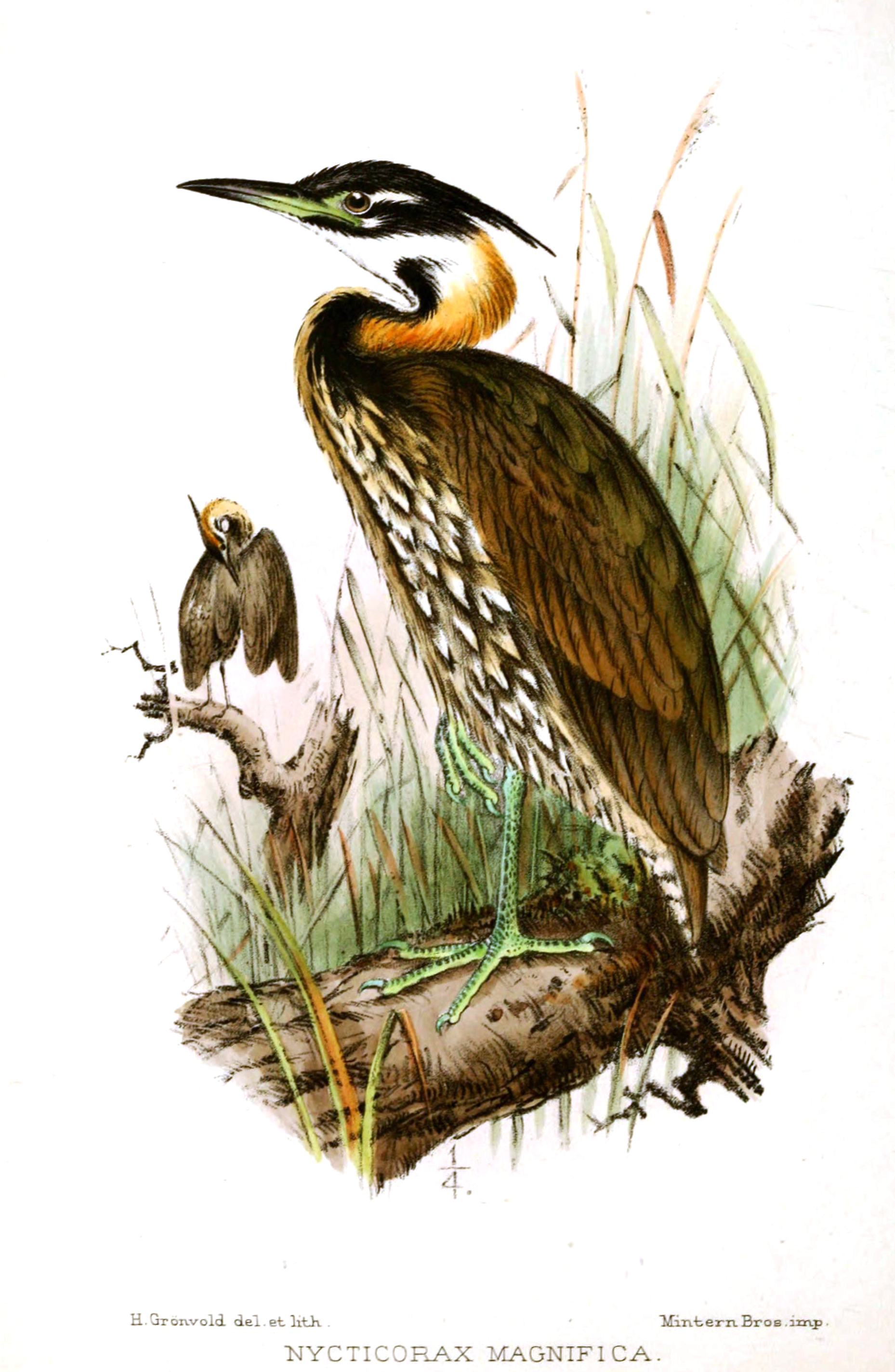
White-eared night heron (Oroanassa magnifica)

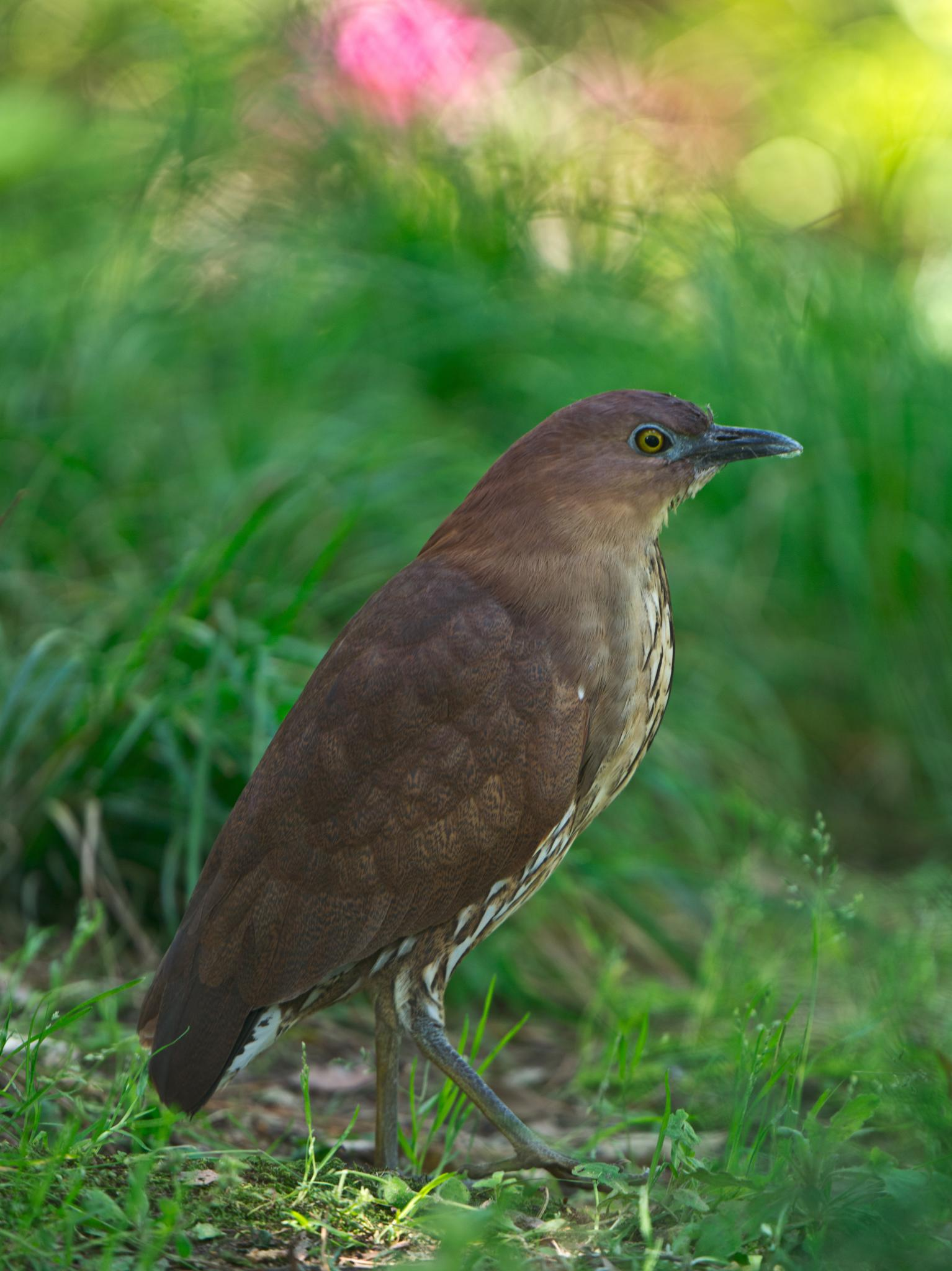
Japanese night heron (Gorsachius goisagi) in Osaka, Japan

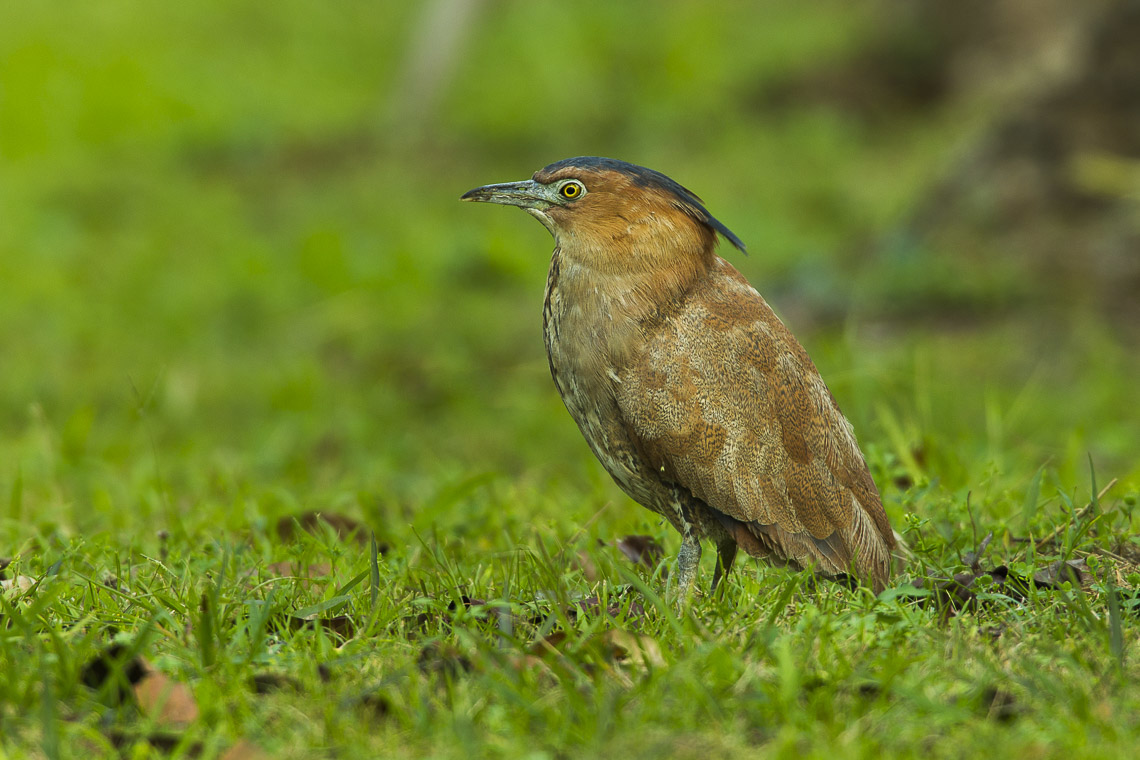
Malayan night heron (Gorsachius melanolophus) in Taiwan
