= White waterlily =

White waterlily can mean:

- Nymphaea alba, of Europe and North Africa
- Nymphaea ampla, of North America and South America
- Nymphaea lotus, of East Africa and Southeast Asia
- Nymphaea nouchali, of South Asia, Southeast Asia and Northern Australia
- Nymphaea odorata, of North America
- Nymphaea pubescens, of South Asia and Southeast Asia
