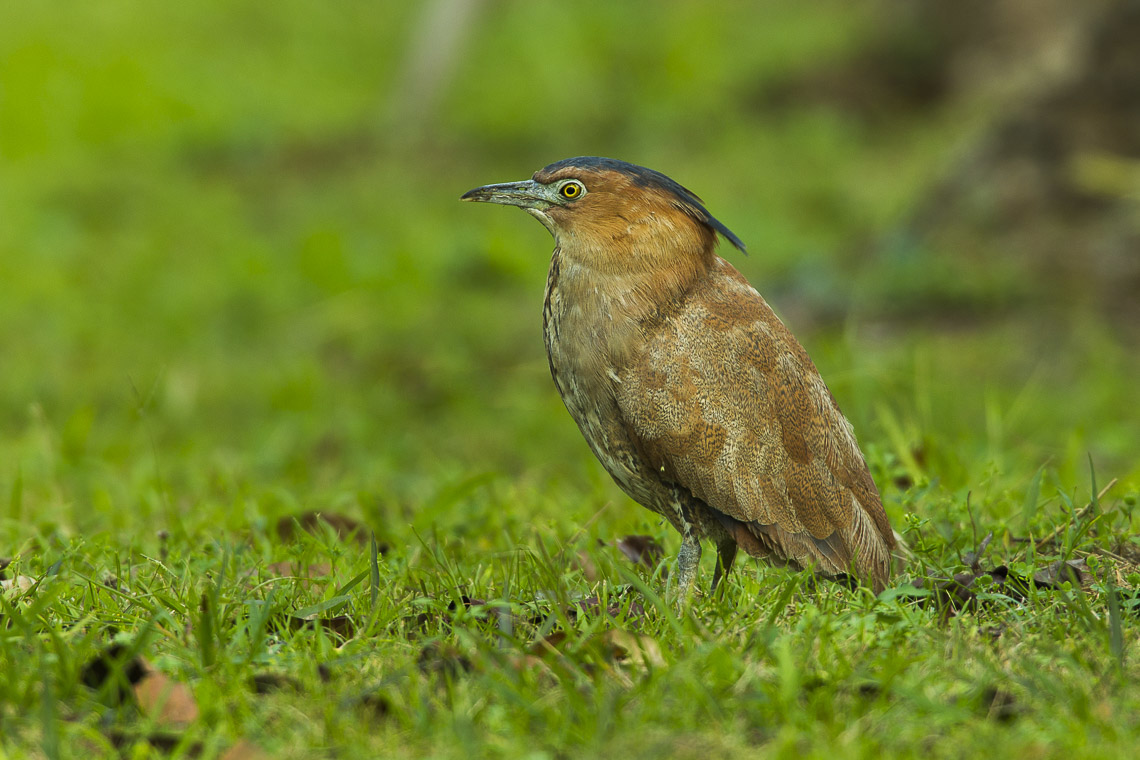

Conservation status
- Least Concern (IUCN 3.1)

Scientific classification
- Kingdom: Animalia
- Phylum: Chordata
- Class: Aves
- Order: Pelecaniformes
- Family: Ardeidae
- Genus: Gorsachius
- Species: G. melanolophus

Binomial name
- Gorsachius melanolophus (Raffles, 1822)
- Range of G. melanolophus Breeding range Resident range Wintering range

Audio
- Malayan night heron call

= Malayan night heron =

Species of bird

The Malayan night heron (Gorsachius melanolophus), also known as Malaysian night heron and tiger bittern, is a medium-sized heron. It is distributed in southern and eastern Asia.

== Distribution and habitat ==
The Malayan night heron has been found in India, Sri Lanka, Brunei, Nepal, Bangladesh, Myanmar, Cambodia, Laos, Vietnam, Thailand, Malaysia, Singapore, China, Indonesia, the Philippines, Taiwan and Japan. It is a vagrant in Palau and Korea. Its range size is estimated at 1,240,000 km^{2}. One roadkilled bird was discovered on Christmas Island, Australia where it is likely a vagrant. This bird occurs in forests, streams, and marshes. In Japan, population densities of the herons increased as undisturbed forest cover on islands increased.

== Description ==
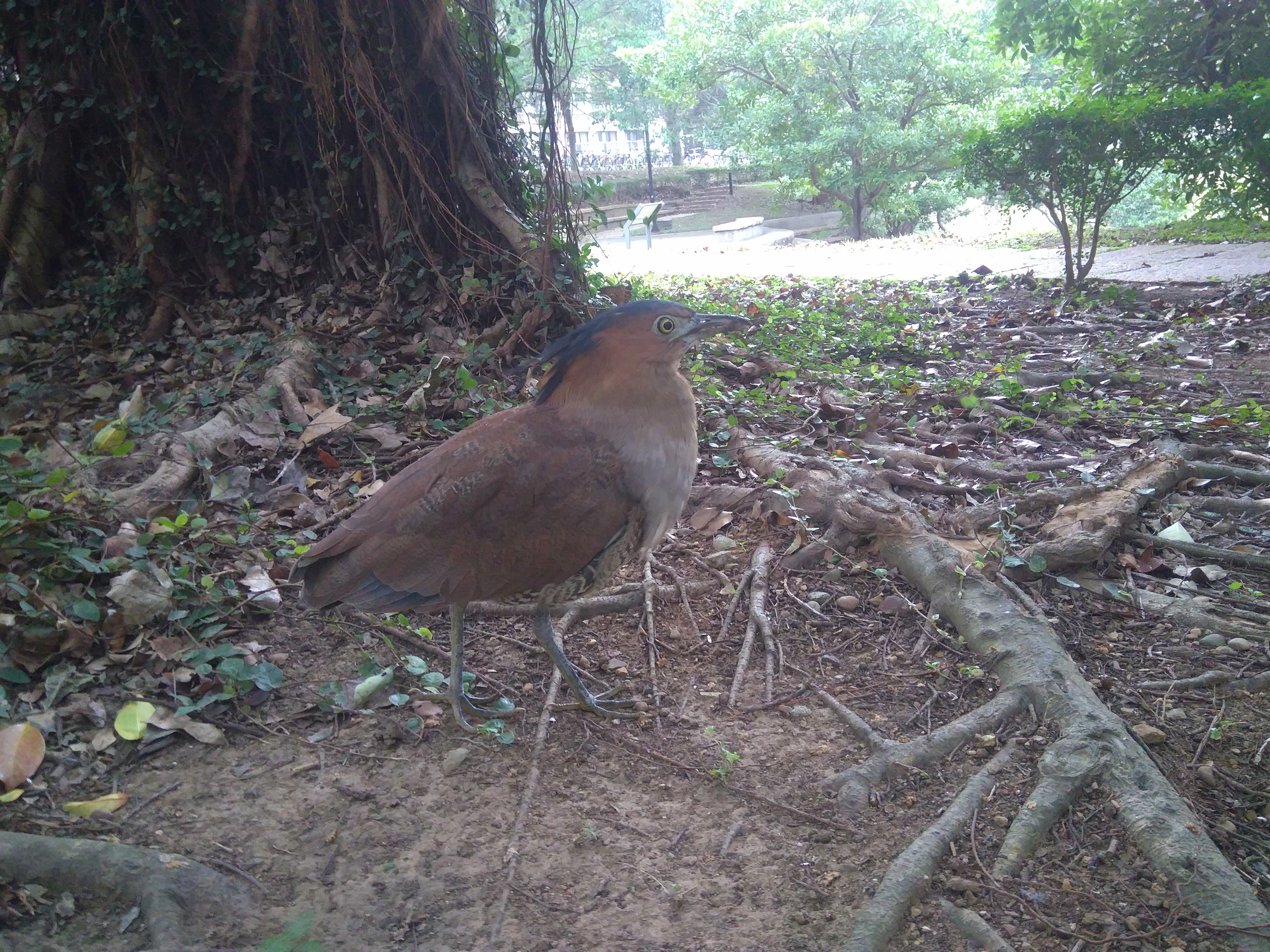
Malayan night heron in Hsinchu, Taiwan

The Malayan night heron is about 48 cm (19 in) long. The wingspan is about 86 cm (34 in). It is stocky, with a short beak. Its neck and breast are rufous. There are streaks going down the centre of the neck to the breast. The upperparts are chestnut and vermiculated. The flight feathers are blackish. The crown is black, the chin is white, and the eyes are yellow. The beak is black and the legs are greenish. The juvenile is greyish to rufous and is spotted and vermiculated. Males have been reported to have deeper blue lores and a longer crest compared to females during the breeding season. Males develop the dark blue lores 30–60 days prior to pair-bonding, while females had bluish-green lores when they first appeared in the breeding areas. Colours of the lores of both sexes faded as incubation progressed, with colours changing to bluish-green to green to greyish-green. If pairs laid a second clutch, the colouration of their lores were duller than the colouration during the first clutch.

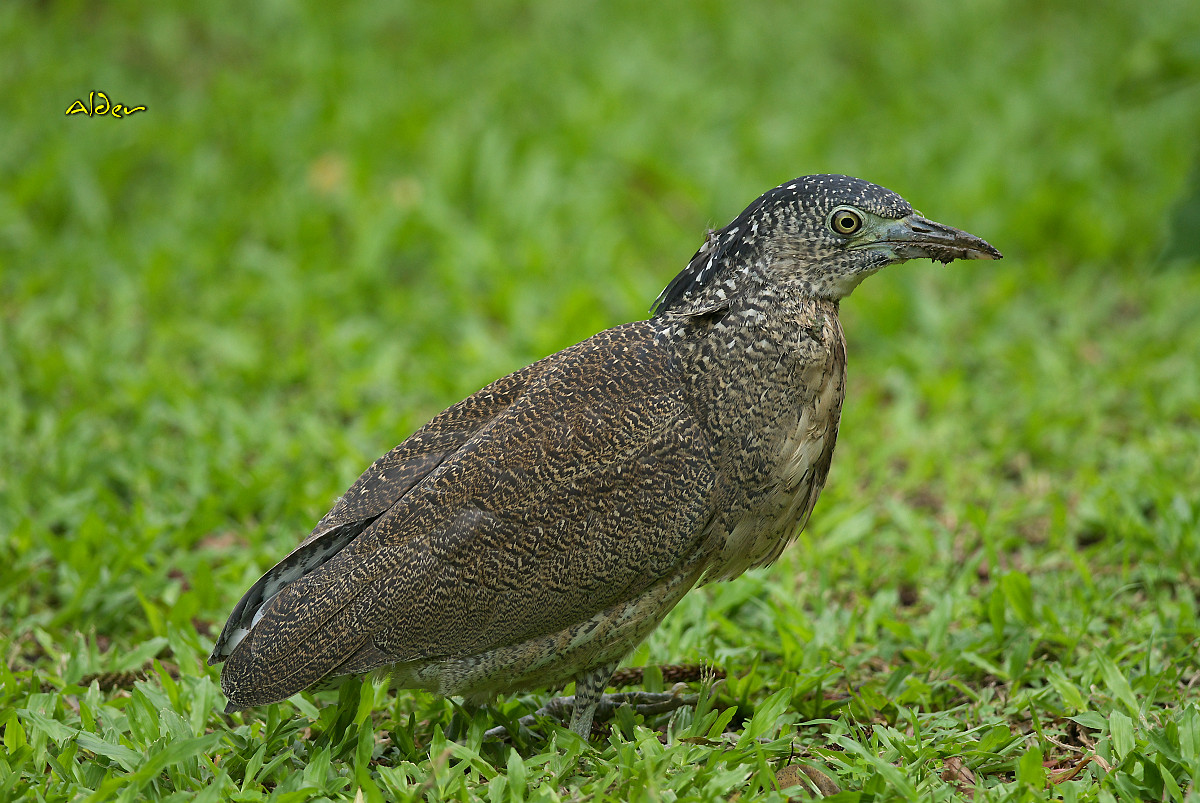
Juvenile

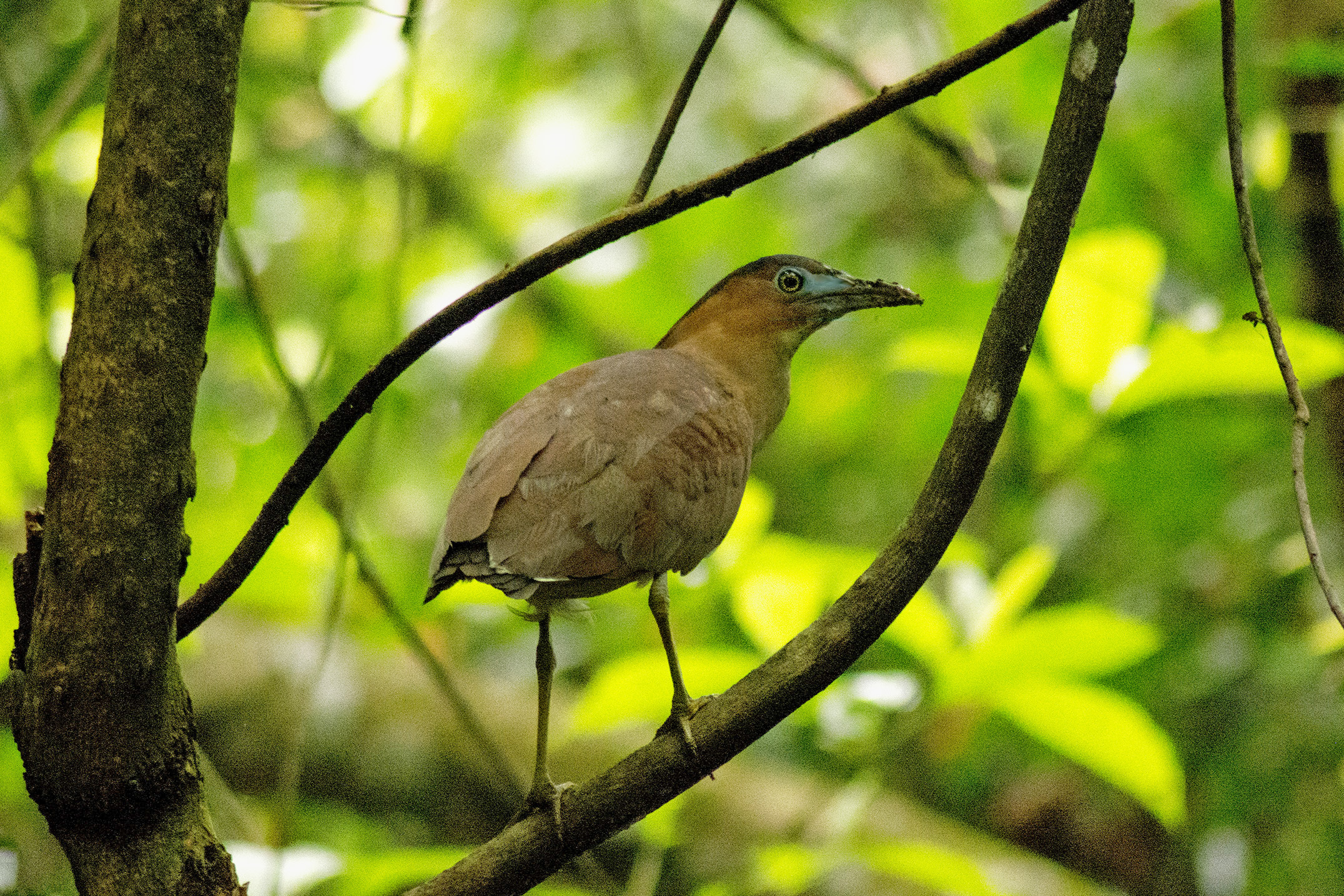
Malayan night heron (Gorsachius melanolophus)

== Biology ==
The Malayan night heron is usually solitary. It roosts in trees and feeds in open areas. It seems to nest singly and not colonially in association with other waterbirds. In Taiwan, nests are sometimes close to urban buildings where the herons feed on earthworms and frogs in open areas amid buildings. Birds with immature plumage attempt to disrupt pair bonding of adults, and sometimes immature birds are seen bonded with adults though their ability to build nests seemed poor. In one observed instance, people assisted an immature-adult pair by building a base for a poorly constructed nest. Of six breeding pairs observed in Taiwan, four were immature-adult pairs suggesting that the species in Taiwan has few breeding adults. Birds in immature plumage appeared to be sexually mature

Its territorial call is deep oo notes. It also produces hoarse croaks and arh, arh, arh.

The most common food items are earthworms and frogs, and it will sometimes eat fish. A study of its pellets found reptiles, snails, chilopods, arachnids, crabs and insects. Pellets of breeding birds in Korea had earthworms, snails and cicadas. An instance of predation of the Brown Anole Anolis sagrei has been observed.

== Conservation ==
The bird has a large range and its global population is between 2,000 and 20,000 individuals. Its population trend is not known, but it does not meet the criteria for a vulnerable species status.
