= Uluabat =

- Neighbourhood
- Location in Turkey Uluabat (Marmara)
- Coordinates: 40°12′10″N 28°26′14″E
- Country: Turkey
- Province: Bursa
- District: Karacabey
- Population (2022): 478
- Time zone: UTC+3 (TRT)

Uluabat, in the Byzantine period Lopadion (Greek: Λοπάδιον), Latinized as Lopadium, is a neighbourhood of the municipality and district of Karacabey, Bursa Province, Turkey. Its population is 478 (2022). It is the site on the ancient town Miletouteichos.

== History ==
Uluabat is located on the banks of the Mustafakemalpaşa River (ancient and medieval Rhyndacus). It is first mentioned by Theodore of Stoudios in one of his letters, as the site of a xenodocheion (caravanserai). By the late 11th century, it featured a market town. The existence of a 4th-century bridge carrying the road between Cyzicus on the Sea of Marmara to the interior of Asia Minor made it a place of some strategic importance, especially in the wars of the Komnenian emperors against the Seljuk Turks in the 11th–12th centuries, during which it is best known. The Seljuks raided Lopadion and its surrounding areas during the reign of Alexios I Komnenos (r. 1081–1118) and a large Seljuk army from Iran, numbering around 40,000 - 50,000 men, sacked the town and pillaged the region in 1113. Alexios fought the Turks in the vicinity, and in 1130, his successor John II Komnenos (r. 1118–43) built there a great fortress which became the base of his campaigns against the Turkish Sultanate of Rum. During the same period, Lopadion is attested as an archbishopric. In 1147, the French and German contingents participating in the Second Crusade united at Lopadion.

Following the fall of the Byzantine Empire to the Fourth Crusade in 1204, the fortress was briefly occupied by the Latin Empire, who returned after the Battle of the Rhyndacus in 1211 and until ca. 1220. It then returned to the Empire of Nicaea, and remained in Byzantine hands until it was captured by the Ottoman Turks in 1335. The area was a site of confrontation during the Ottoman Interregnum as well: sometime in March–May 1403, Mehmed I defeated his brother İsa Çelebi in the Battle of Ulubad, and consolidated his control over the Asian heartland of the Ottoman Empire around Bursa. In January 1422, the armies of Mehmed's son Murad II and Mustafa Çelebi confronted each other in the area, until Murad engineered the defection of Junayd of Aydın and the other supporters of Mustafa, forcing the latter to retreat to Europe, where he was captured and executed.

== See also ==
- Ulubatlı Hasan

== Sources ==
- Kastritsis, Dimitris (2007). The Sons of Bayezid: Empire Building and Representation in the Ottoman Civil War of 1402-13. BRILL. ISBN 978-90-04-15836-8.
- Kazhdan, Alexander, ed. (1991). The Oxford Dictionary of Byzantium. Oxford and New York: Oxford University Press. ISBN 978-0-19-504652-6.
- Magoulias, Harry, ed. (1975). Decline and Fall of Byzantium to the Ottoman Turks, by Doukas. An Annotated Translation of "Historia Turco-Byzantina" by Harry J. Magoulias, Wayne State University. Detroit: Wayne State University Press. ISBN 0-8143-1540-2.
