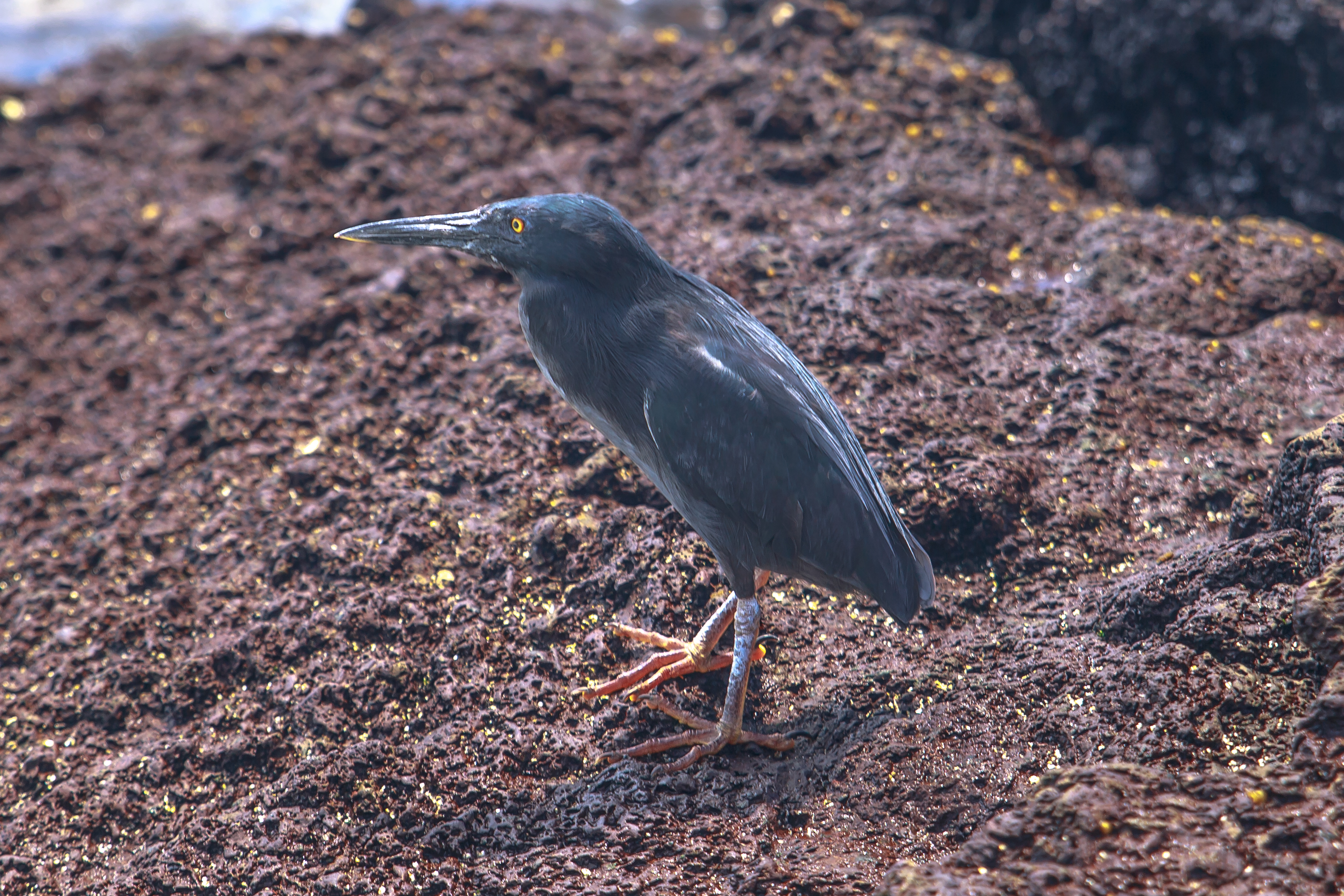
- Adult on Isla Bartolome

Scientific classification
- Kingdom: Animalia
- Phylum: Chordata
- Class: Aves
- Order: Pelecaniformes
- Family: Ardeidae
- Genus: Butorides
- Species: B. sundevalli

Binomial name
- Butorides sundevalli (Reichenow, 1877)

Synonyms
- Butorides striata sundevalli

= Lava heron =

Species of bird

The lava heron (Butorides sundevalli), also known as the Galápagos heron, is a species of heron endemic to the Galápagos Islands of Ecuador. It was considered by some authorities, including the American Ornithological Society and BirdLife International, to be a subspecies (or even just a colour morph) of the striated heron (B. striata), and was formerly lumped with this species and the green heron (B. virescens) as the green-backed heron. Recent research has shown (unexpectedly) that it is more closely related to the North American green heron, than it is to the geographically much closer South American striated heron, and its status as a Galápagos endemic species is now universally accepted.

== Description ==
The adult is slate-grey to black, which allows it to blend in with the hardened lava. The back feathers typically have a silvery sheen and it has a short crest on its head. When breeding, the heron has a black beak and bright orange legs, but these fade to grey after the breeding season.

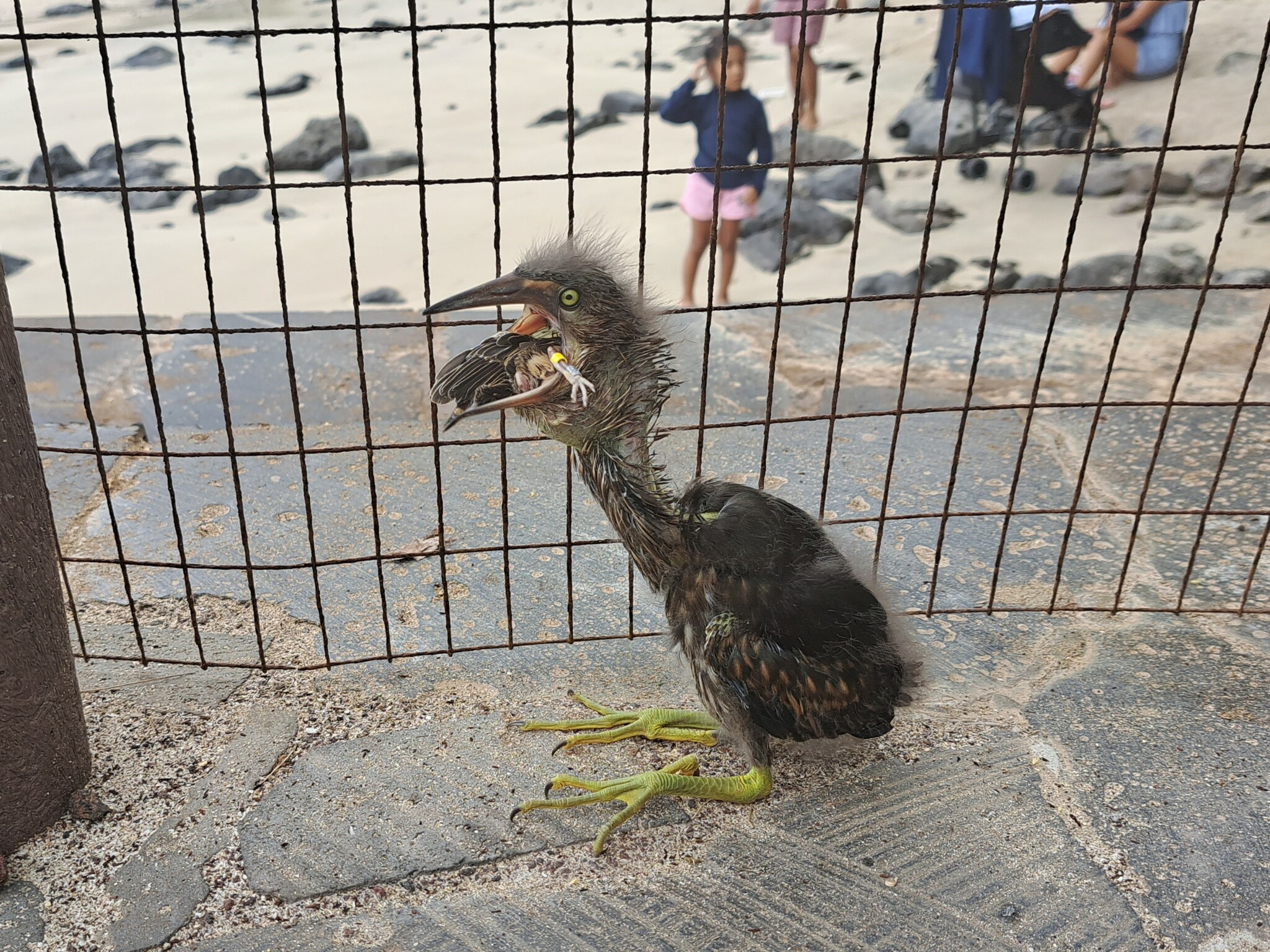
Nestling swallowing a young bird, San Cristóbal Island.

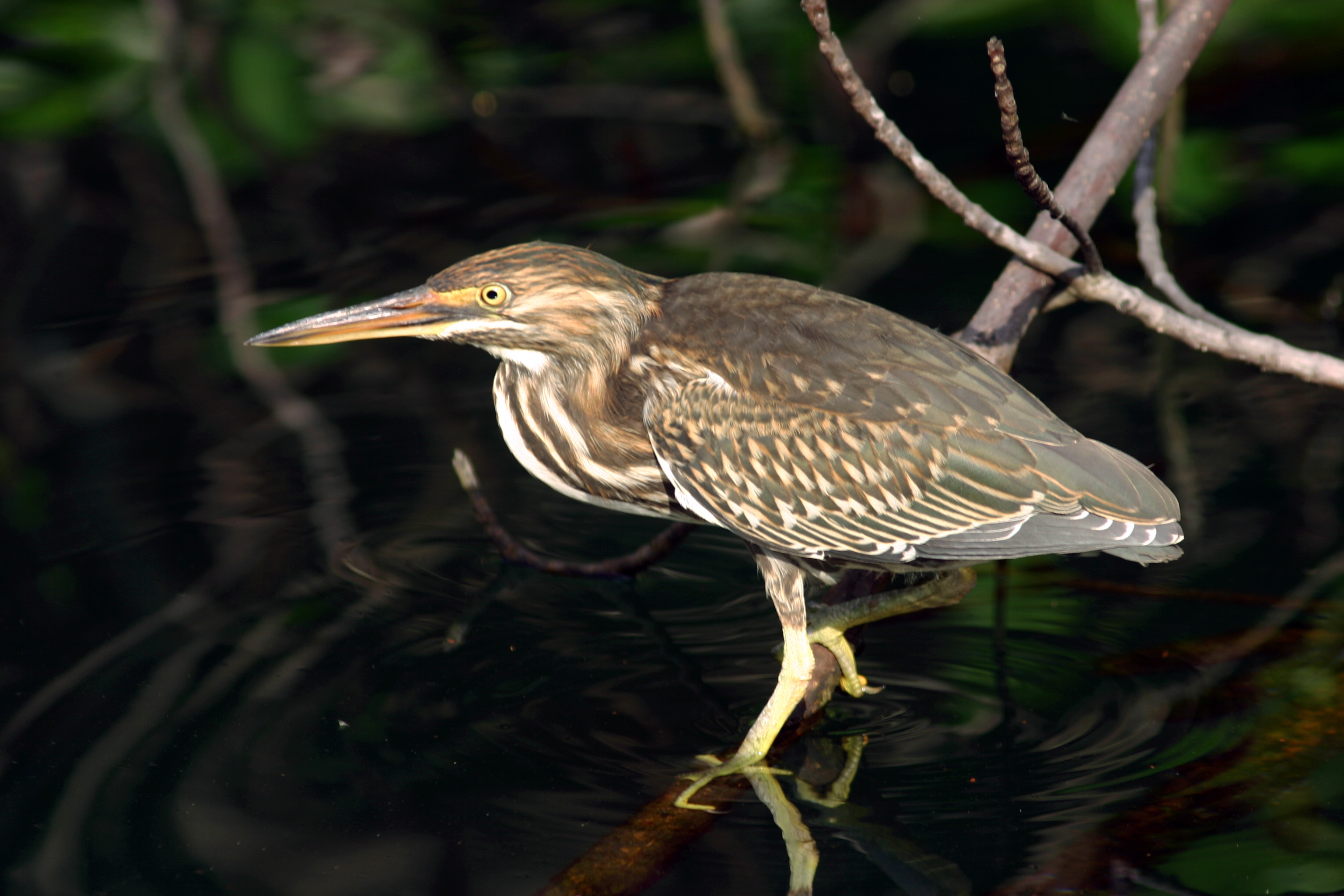
Juvenile, Isabela Island

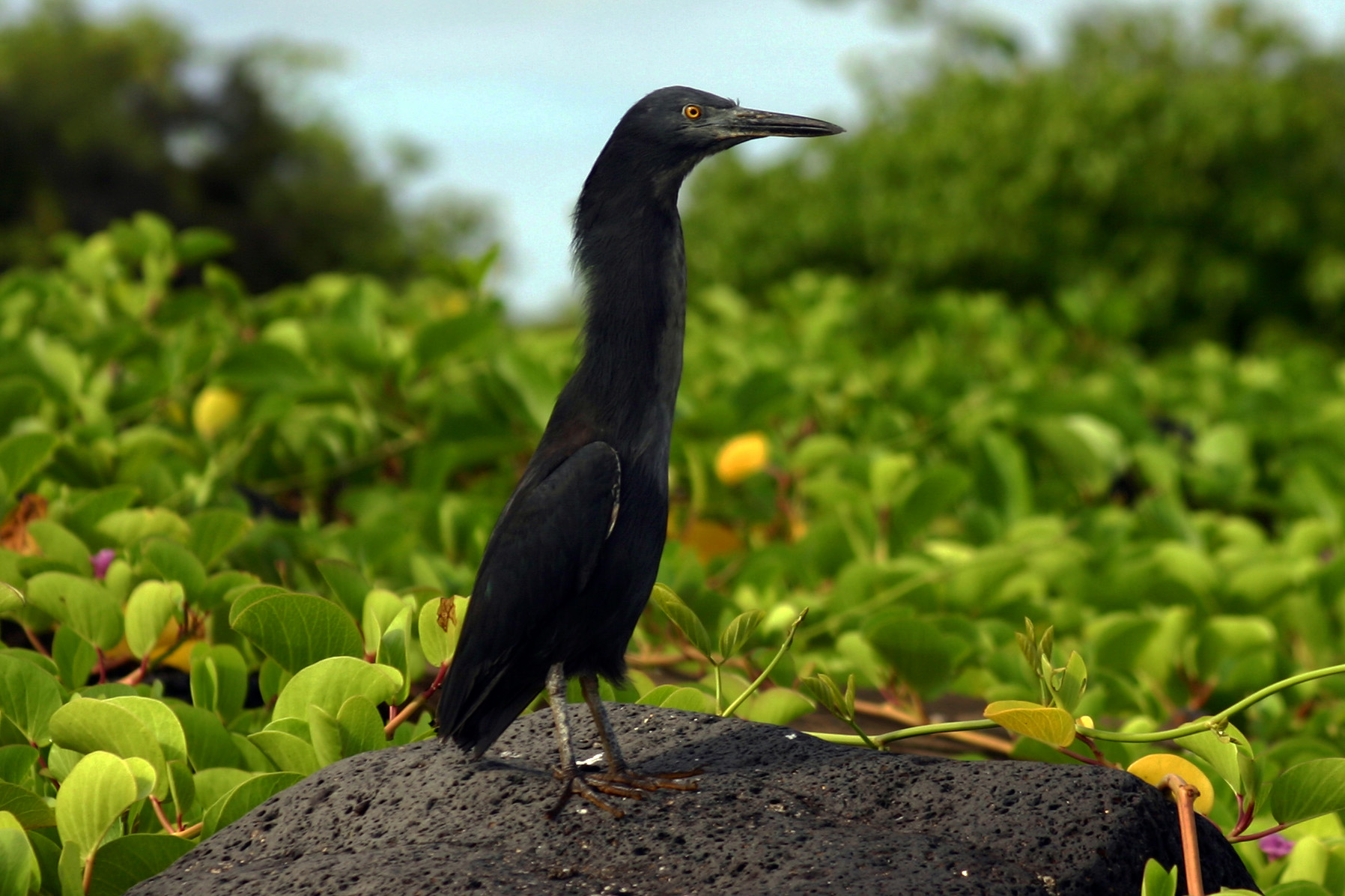
Young adult, Isabela Island

== Distribution and habitat ==
These highly territorial birds are found in intertidal zones and mangrove swamps on all of the islands of Galápagos Province.

== Behaviour ==
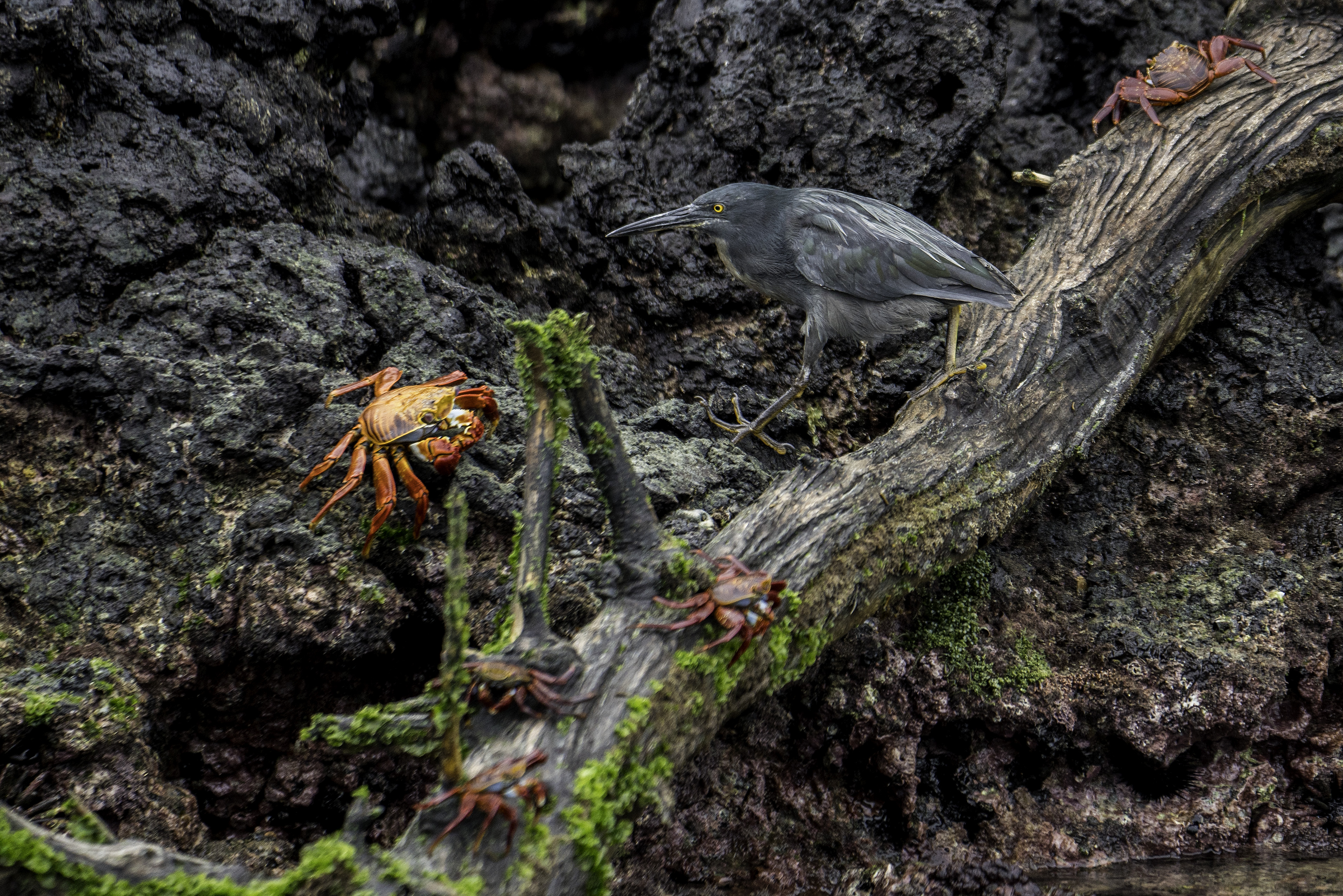
Lava heron stalking crabs, Galápagos Islands, Ecuador

=== Diet ===
The lava heron stalks small crabs and fish slowly before quickly spearing and eating them. They have also been known to eat the flies that gather near cacti and occasionally smaller birds.

=== Interactions ===
These birds have little fear of humans. It has been noted they have flight behaviour, some of which may carry the purpose of territory defence and advertising.

=== Calls ===
Lava herons are typically seen hunched over and they have a sharp alarm call, described as a scow sound. During aggressive behaviour they will use a skuk-skuk call.

== Breeding ==
Unlike most herons, these birds nest in solitary pairs for one breeding season in either the lower branches of mangrove trees or under lava rocks. They can breed year-round, though typically from September to March, and can mate up to three times a year and have up to ten eggs each time.
