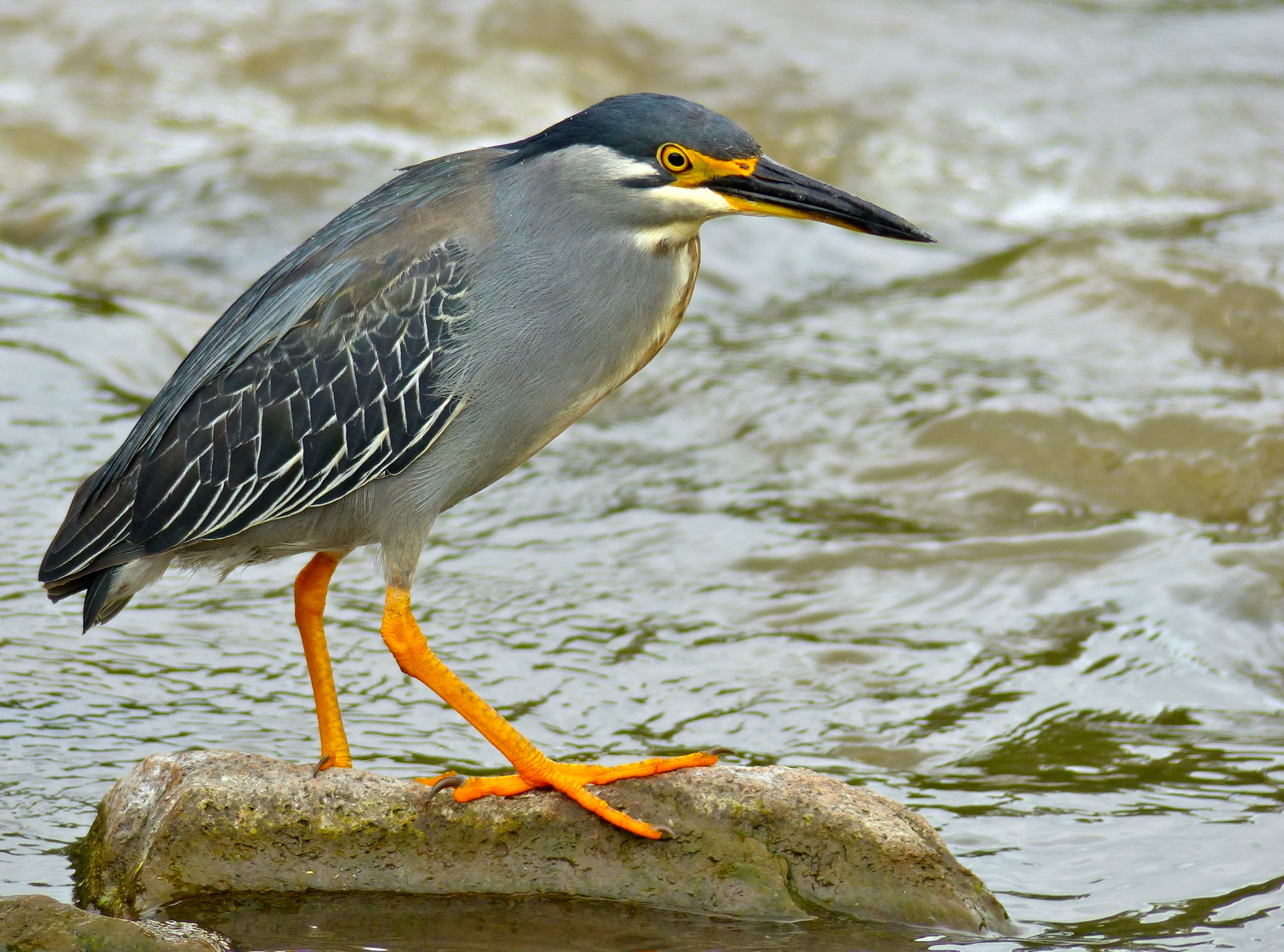
- Nominate subspecies, Kruger National Park, South Africa

Conservation status
- Not evaluated (IUCN 3.1)

Scientific classification
- Kingdom: Animalia
- Phylum: Chordata
- Class: Aves
- Order: Pelecaniformes
- Family: Ardeidae
- Genus: Butorides
- Species: B. atricapilla

Binomial name
- Butorides atricapilla (Afzelius, 1804)
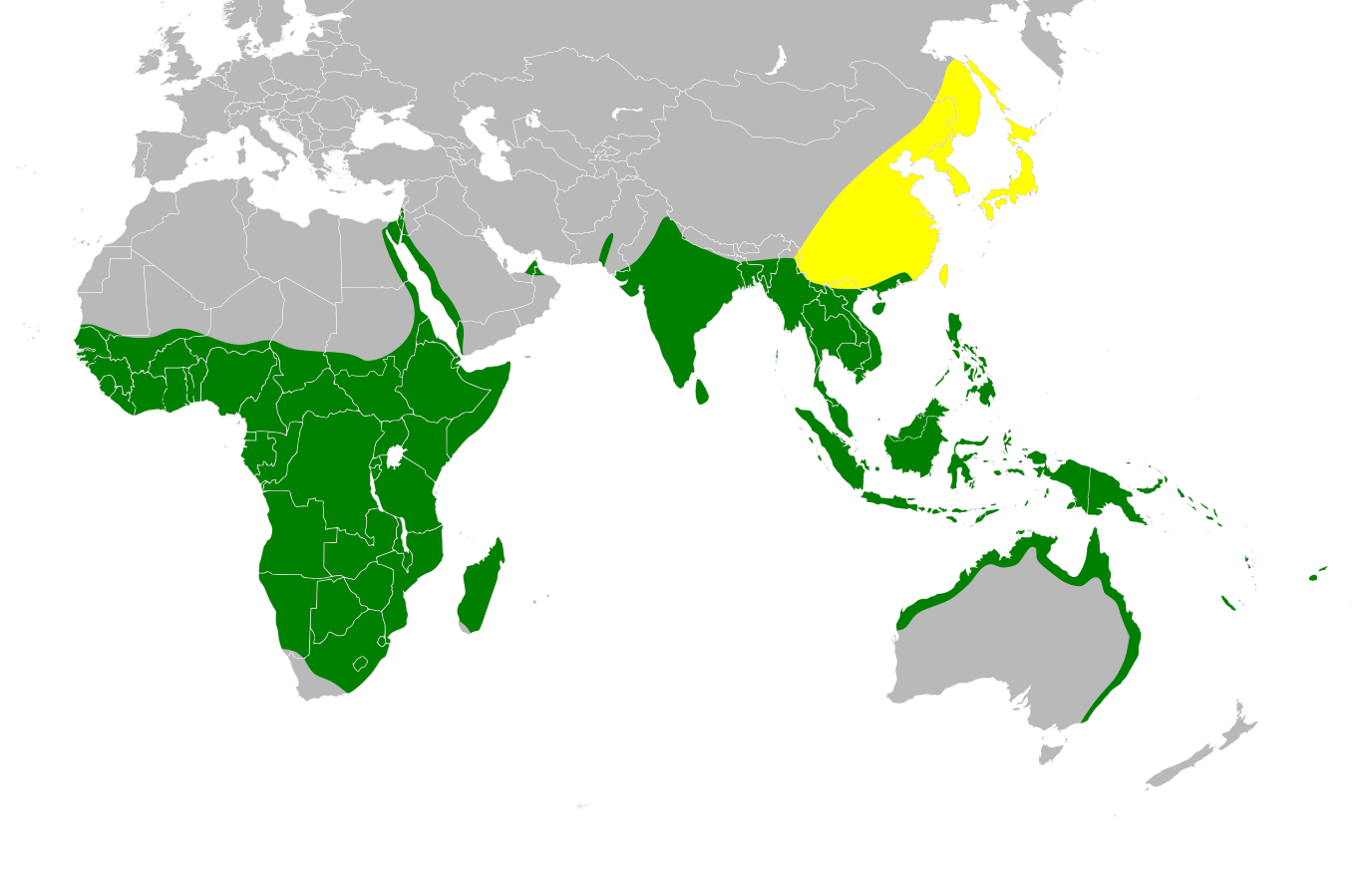
- Range of the little heron

Synonyms
- Ardea atricapilla (protonym); Ardea chloriceps Bonaparte, 1857

= Little heron =

Species of bird

The little heron (Butorides atricapilla) is a small heron, about 44 cm tall. It is mostly sedentary and frequents both fresh and salt water habitats. It is found in the Old World tropics from west Africa to Japan and Australia. The little heron was formerly considered to be conspecific with the striated heron.

== Taxonomy ==
The little heron was formally described in 1804 by the Swedish naturalist Adam Afzelius based on a specimen collected in Sierra Leone, West Africa. He placed the new species with the herons in the genus Ardea and coined the binomial name Ardea atricapilla. The specific epithet is Latin meaning "black-haired". The little heron is now one of four species placed in the genus Butorides that was introduced in 1852 by the English zoologist Edward Blyth.

The little heron was formerly considered to be conspecific with the striated heron (Butorides striata). A molecular phylogenetic study of the genus Butorides, submitted in 2023 as a master's thesis, found that the striated heron was paraphyletic. To resolve the paraphyly, twenty subspecies of the striated heron were moved to a new species, the little heron, making the striated heron a monotypic species restricted to South America.

Twenty subspecies are recognised:

- B. a. atricapilla (Afzelius, 1804) – Africa south of the Sahara and up the Nile Valley to Faiyum
- B. a. brevipes (Hemprich & Ehrenberg, 1833) – Somalia and the Red Sea coasts
- B. a. crawfordi Nicoll, 1906 – Aldabra and Amirante groups (south, central Seychelles)
- B. a. rhizophorae Salomonsen, 1934 – Comoros
- B. a. rutenbergi (Hartlaub, 1880) – Madagascar and Réunion
- B. a. degens Hartert, EJO, 1920 – northeast Seychelles
- B. a. albolimbata Reichenow, 1900 – Chagos Archipelago and Maldives
- B. a. amurensis (Schrenck, 1860) – southeast Siberia, northeast China and Japan
- B. a. actophila Oberholser, 1912 – east China to north Myanmar and north Vietnam
- B. a. javanica (Horsfield, 1821) – Pakistan, India and Sri Lanka to Thailand, Philippines, the Greater Sunda Islands and Sulawesi
- B. a. spodiogaster Sharpe, 1894 – Andaman and Nicobar Islands and islands off west Sumatra
- B. a. steini Mayr, 1943 – Lesser Sunda Islands
- B. a. moluccarum Hartert, EJO, 1920 – Moluccas
- B. a. papuensis Mayr, 1940 – northwest New Guinea
- B. a. idenburgi Rand, 1941 – north New Guinea
- B. a. flyensis Salomonsen, 1966 – central south, southeast New Guinea
- B. a. stagnatilis (Gould, 1848) – coastal northwest, central north Australia
- B. a. macrorhyncha (Gould, 1848) – east, northeast Australia and New Caledonia
- B. a. solomonensis Mayr, 1940 – New Hanover Island to Solomon Islands (except Rennell Island), and Vanuatu to Fiji (southwest Polynesia)
- B. a. patruelis (Peale, 1849) – Tahiti (Society Islands)

== Description ==
The little heron is 35–48 cm (14–19 in) in length, weighs 130–250 g (4.6–8.8 oz) and has a wing-span of 52–60 cm (20–24 in). The sexes are alike. The plumage is vary variable, even sometimes within the same subspecies. Adults have a blue-grey back and wings, white underparts, a black cap, a dark line extends from the bill to under the eye and short yellow legs. Juveniles are browner above and streaked below. The two Australian subspecies B. a. macrorhyncha and B. a. stagnatilis are dimorphic, with grey and rufous morphs.

== Distribution and habitat ==
The little heron is found in the Old World tropics from Sub-Saharan Africa to Japan and south to Australia. It inhabits both fresh water and salt water habitats, typically in mangroves but is also found in vegetation along rivers and streams.

== Behaviour ==
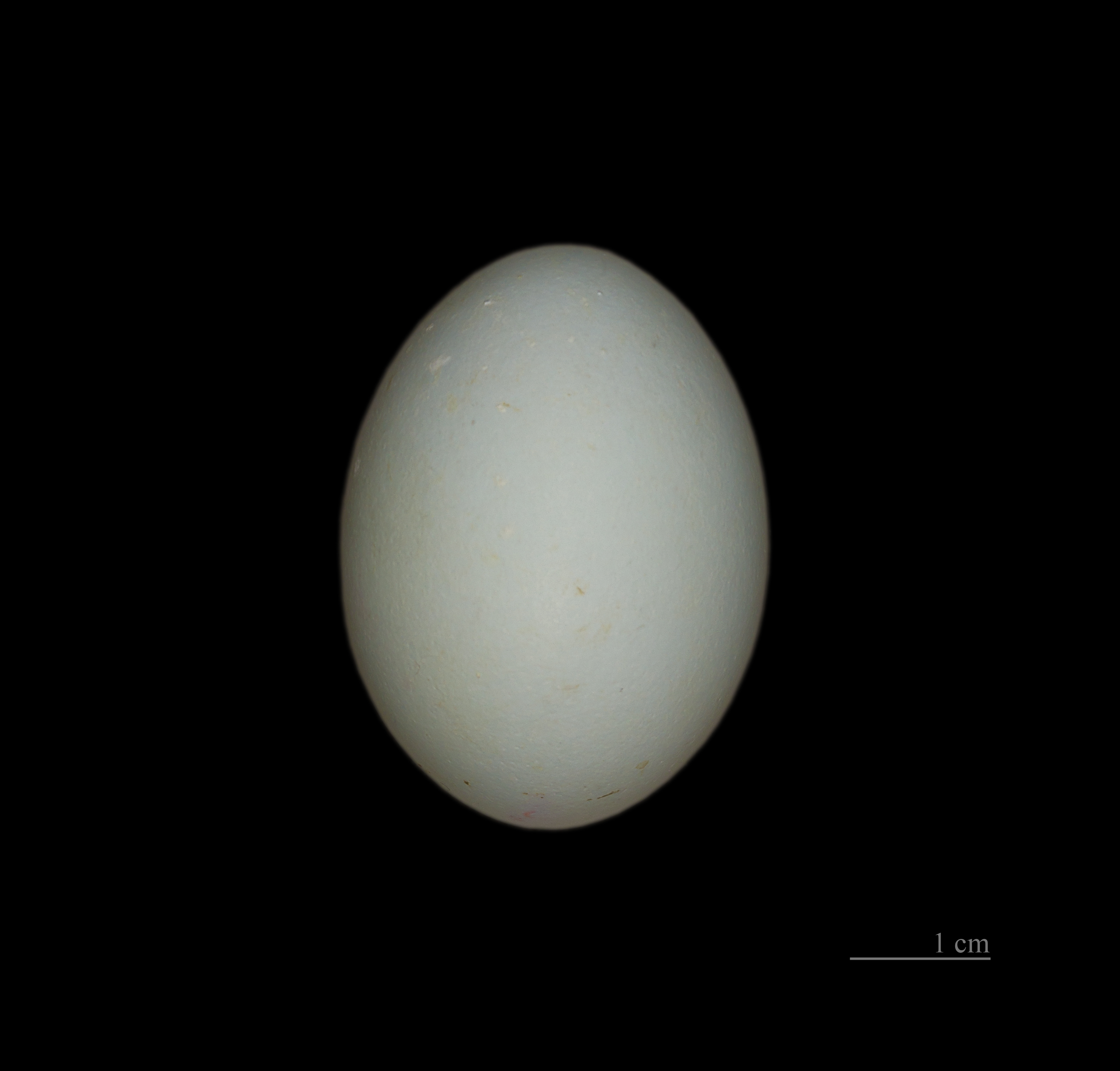
Egg, Muséum de Toulouse

=== Food and feeding ===
These birds stand still at the water's edge and wait to ambush prey. They mainly eat small fish, frogs and aquatic insects.

=== Breeding ===
The nest is hidden amongst shrubs or branches. The clutch of 2–5 eggs is incubated for 19-25 days. The chicks are covered with pale-grey down with white above. They fledge when they are around 5 weeks of age.

== Gallery ==
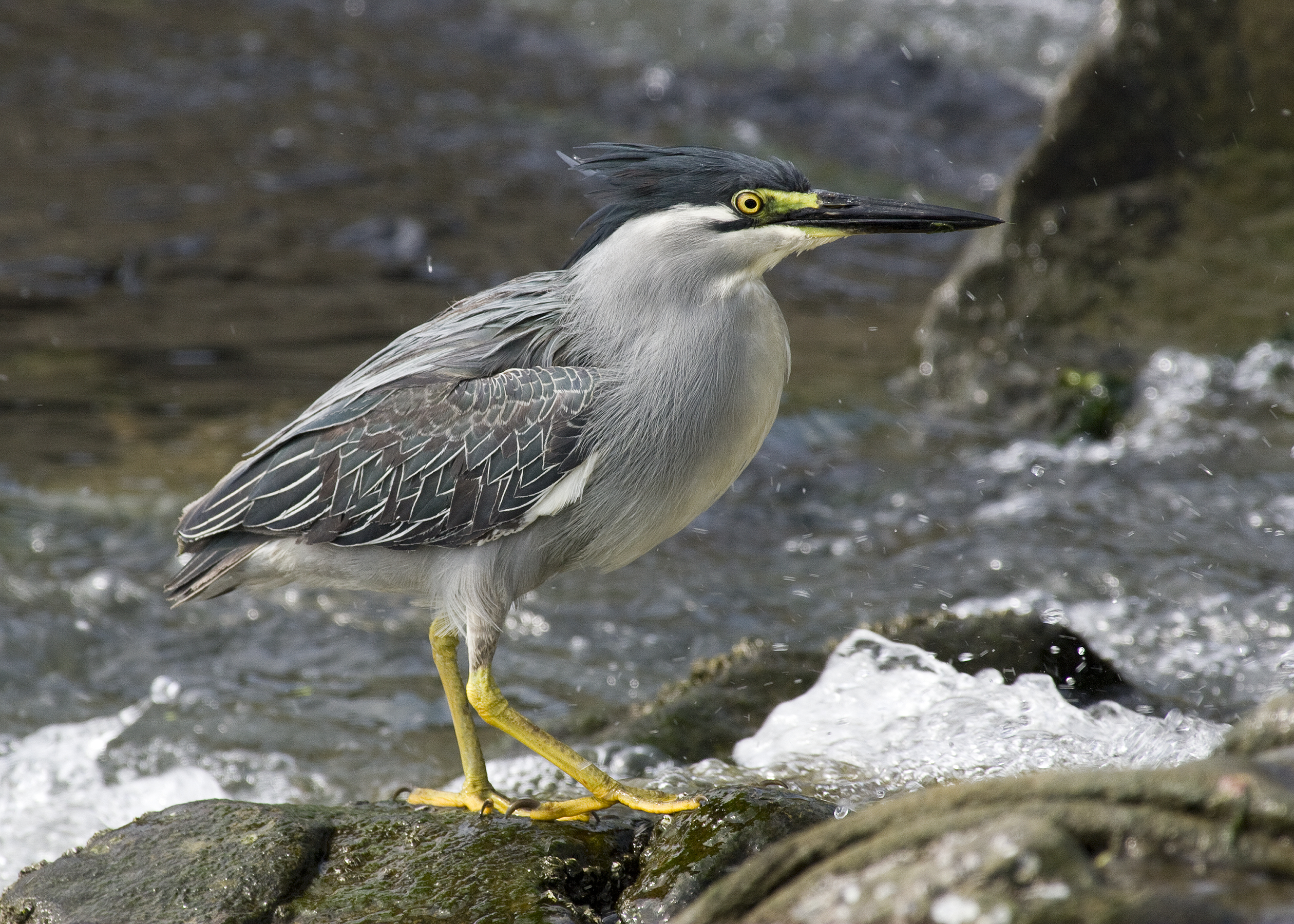
B. a. amurensis, Japan

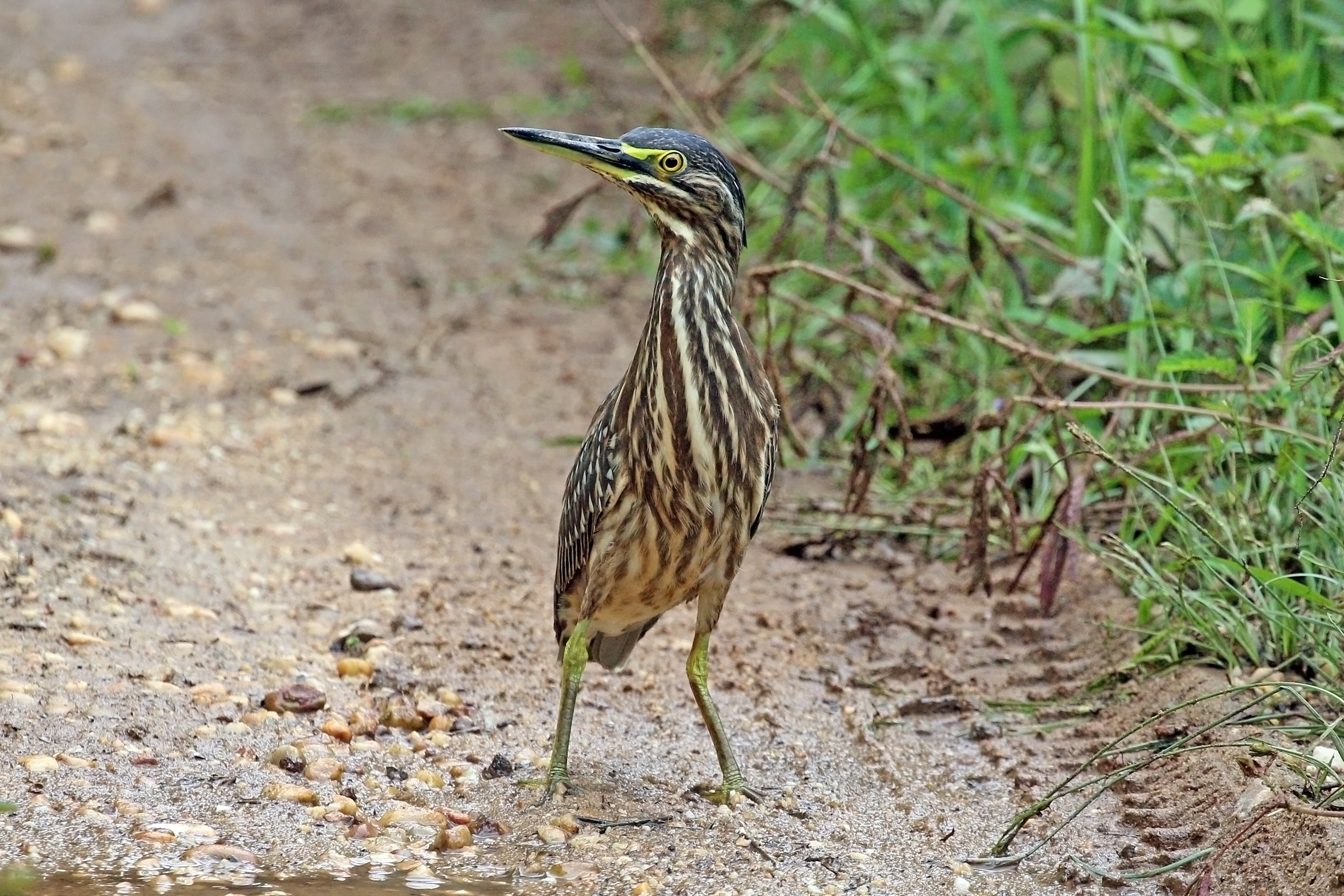
juvenile B. a. atricapilla, Ghana

B. a. atricapilla non-breeding male, Egypt

B. a. atricapilla non-breeding male, Egypt

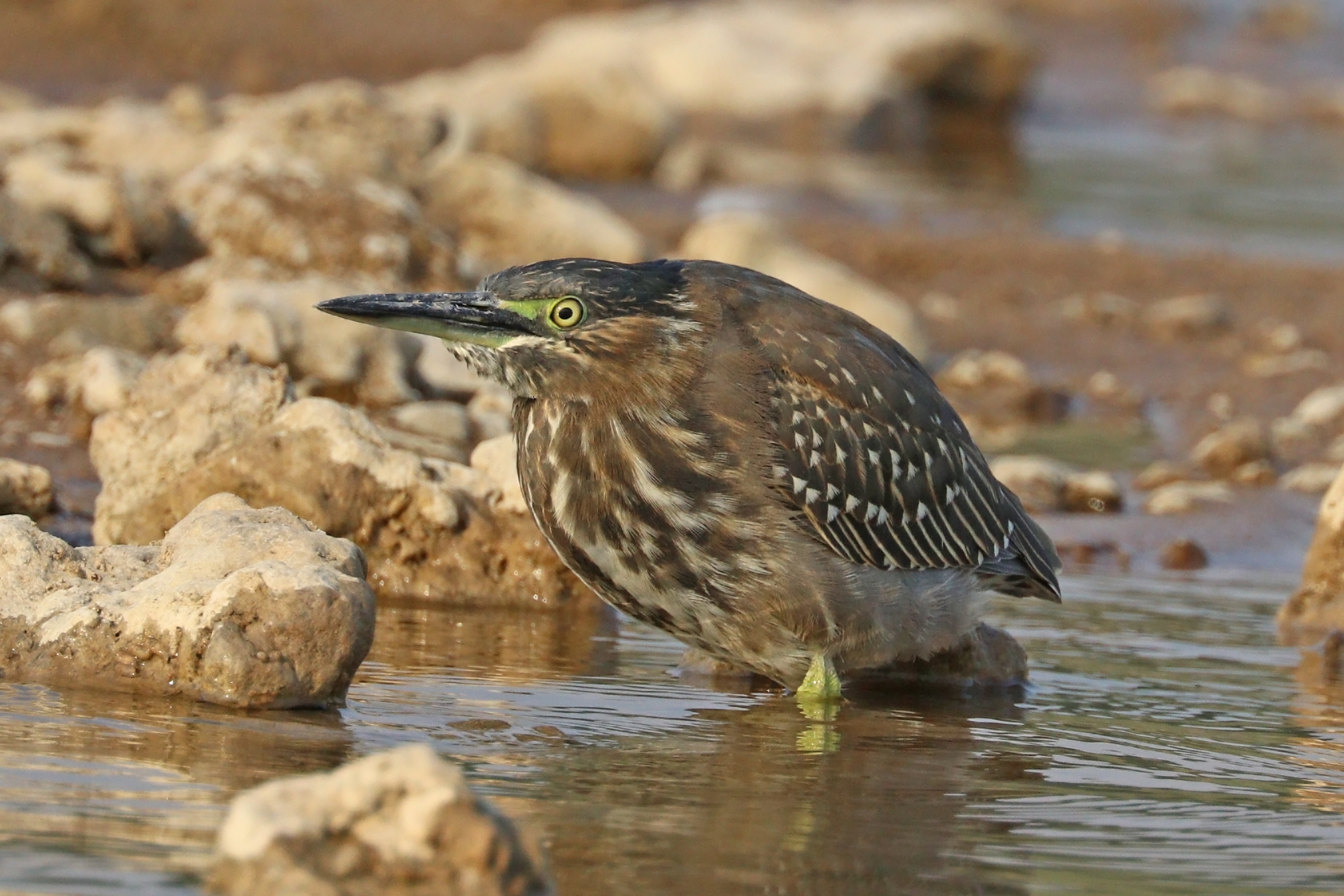
B. a. javanica, juvenile, India

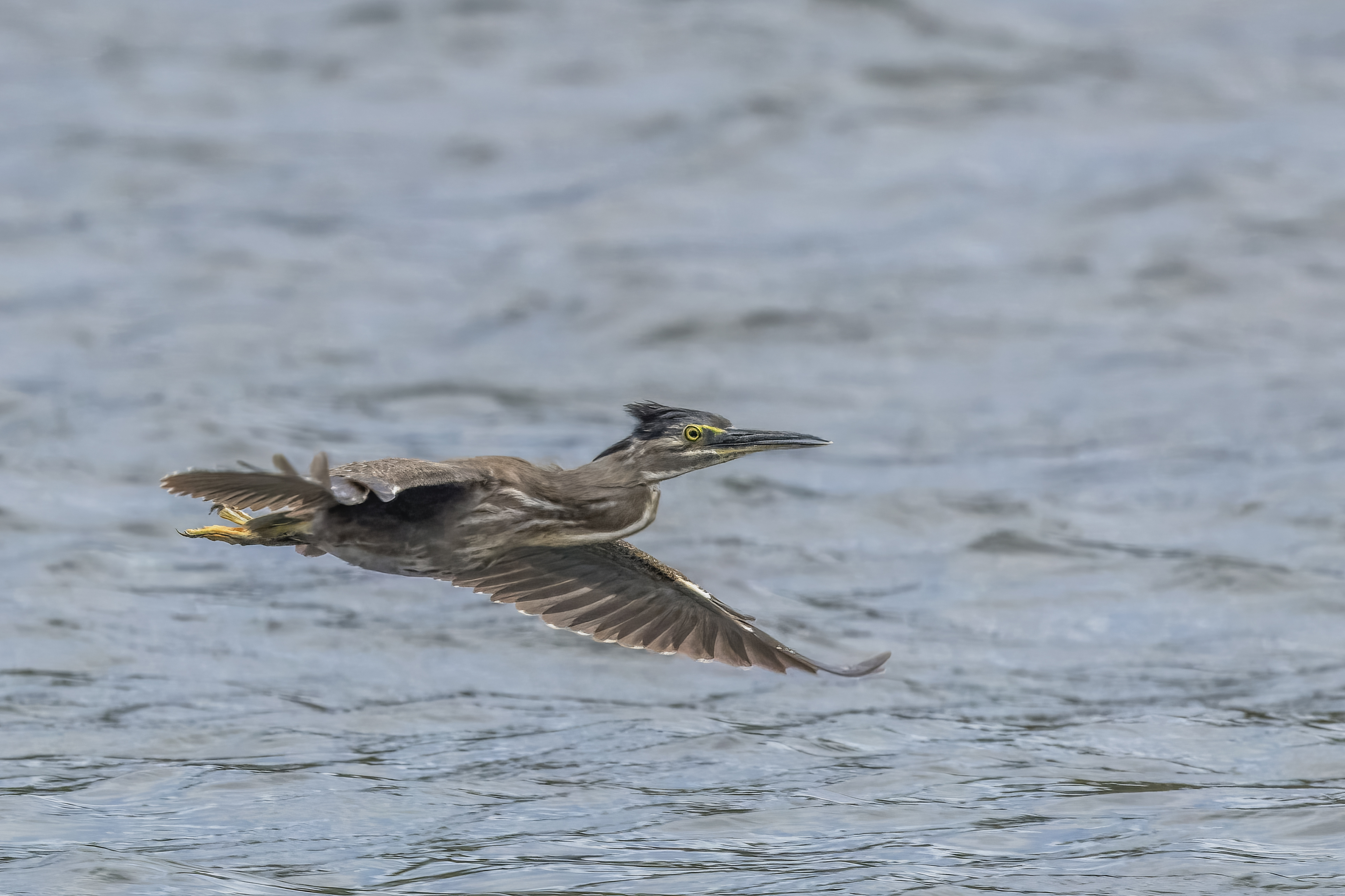
B. a. javanica, juvenile, Philippines

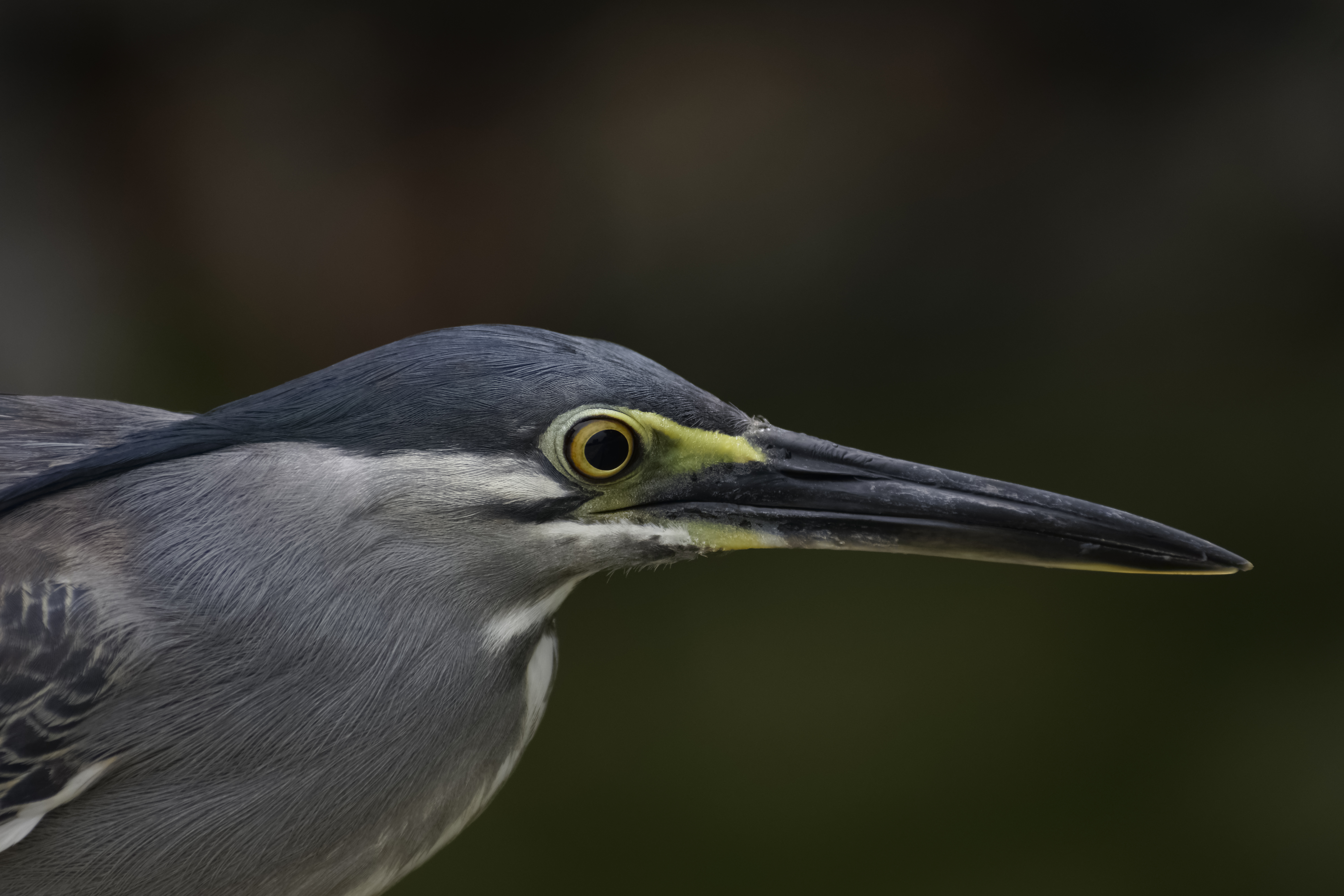
B. a. javanica, Malaysia

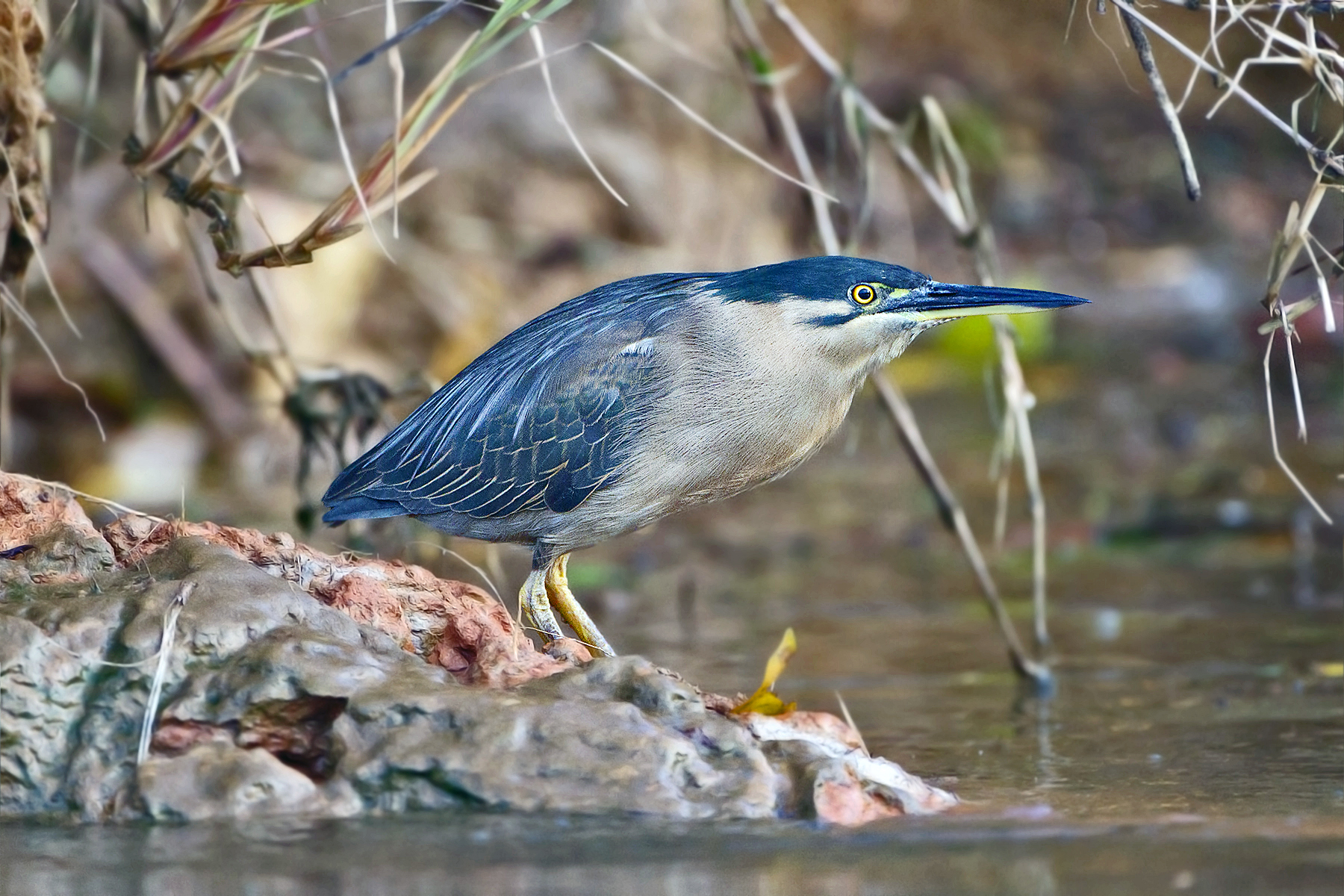
B. s. macrorhyncha on the Daintree River, North Queensland, Australia
