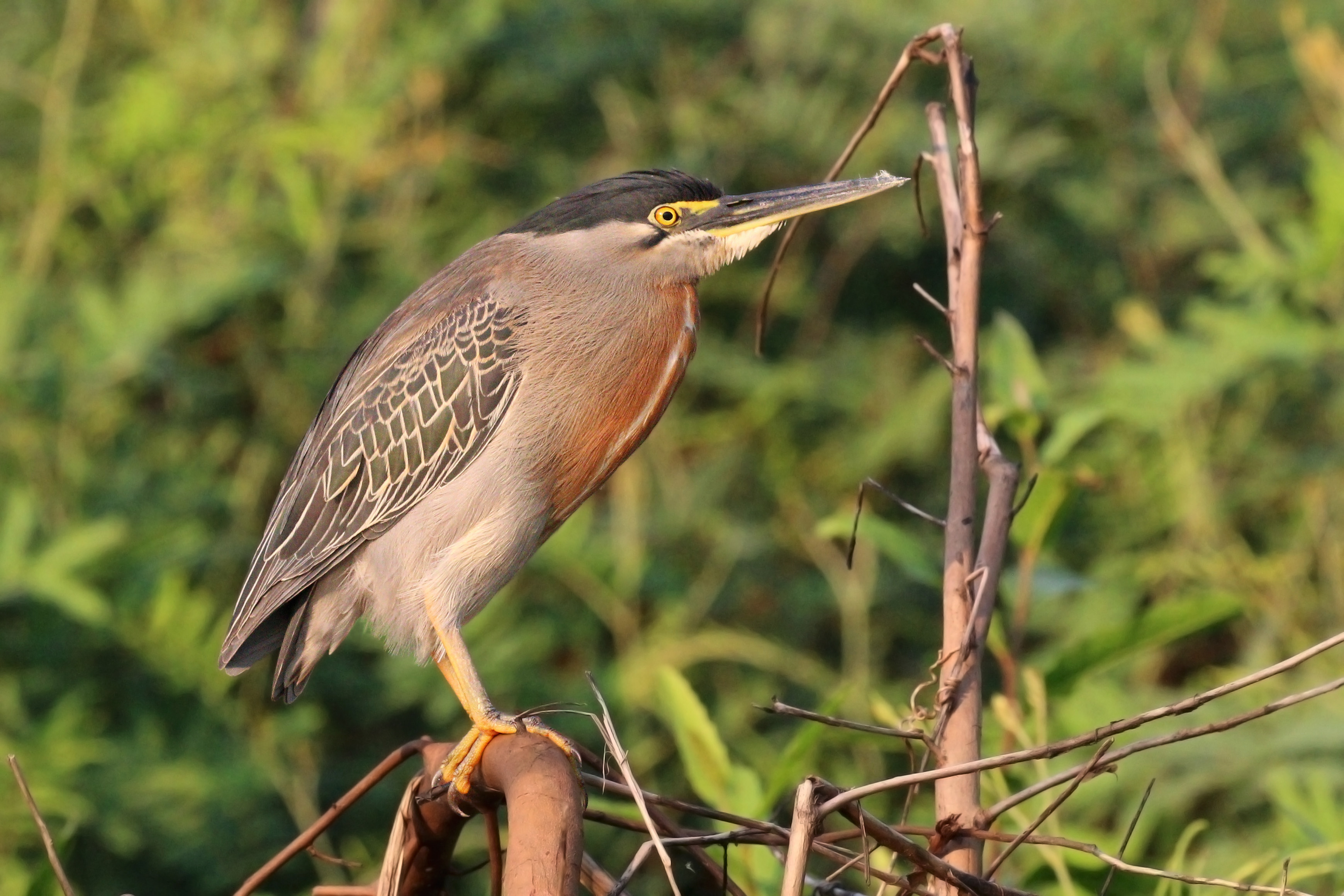
- Nominate Butorides striata striata, Pantanal, Brazil

Conservation status
- Least Concern (IUCN 3.1)

Scientific classification
- Kingdom: Animalia
- Phylum: Chordata
- Class: Aves
- Order: Pelecaniformes
- Family: Ardeidae
- Genus: Butorides
- Species: B. striata

Binomial name
- Butorides striata (Linnaeus, 1758)
- Range of the striated heron Year-round

Synonyms
- Ardea striata Linnaeus, 1758; Butorides striatus (lapsus)

= Striated heron =

Species of bird

The striated heron (Butorides striata) also known as mangrove heron or little green heron, is a small heron, about 44 cm tall. It is mostly sedentary and noted for some interesting behavioural traits. The breeding habitat is in South America and the Caribbean. The striated heron was formerly considered to be conspecific with the little heron that is found in the Old World tropics from west Africa to Japan and Australia.

== Taxonomy ==
The striated heron was formally described by the Swedish naturalist Carl Linnaeus in 1758 in the tenth edition of his Systema Naturae. He placed it with the other herons in the genus Ardea and coined the binomial name Ardea striata. Linnaeus specified the locality as Suriname. The specific epithet is from Latin striatus meaning "striated". The striated heron is now one of four closely related species placed in the genus Butorides that was described in 1852 by the English zoologist Edward Blyth. This bird was long considered to be conspecific with the closely related North American species, the green heron, which is now usually separated as Butorides virescens, as well as the lava heron of the Galápagos Islands (now Butorides sundevalli, but often included in Butorides striata, e.g. by BirdLife International); collectively they were called "green-backed heron".

A molecular phylogenetic study of the genus Butorides, submitted in 2023 as a master's thesis, found that the striated heron was paraphyletic. To resolve the paraphyly, twenty subspecies of the striated heron were moved to a new species, the little heron, making the striated heron a monotypic species restricted to South America.

== Description ==
The striated heron is 35–48 cm (14–19 in) in length, weighs 130–250 g (4.6–8.8 oz) and has a wing-span of 52–60 cm (20–24 in). The sexes are alike. The plumage is variable below, from mid grey to pinkish-purple or orangey toned. Adults have a blue-grey back and wings, white underparts, a black cap, a dark line extends from the bill to under the eye and short yellow legs. Juveniles are browner above and heavily streaked below.

== Distribution and habitat ==
It is widespread in tropical and warm temperate South America, from central and southeastern Panama south to Río Negro Province in Argentina. It is generally a lowland bird, found in marshes, lakes and rivers, in Peru up to an altitude of 800 m, thus avoiding the Andes mountains. In Trinidad and Tobago and in central Panama, it overlaps slightly in range with the closely related green heron and hybridises with it; hybrids are intermediate between the two species, generally much more purple-red below than typical striated herons.

== Behaviour ==
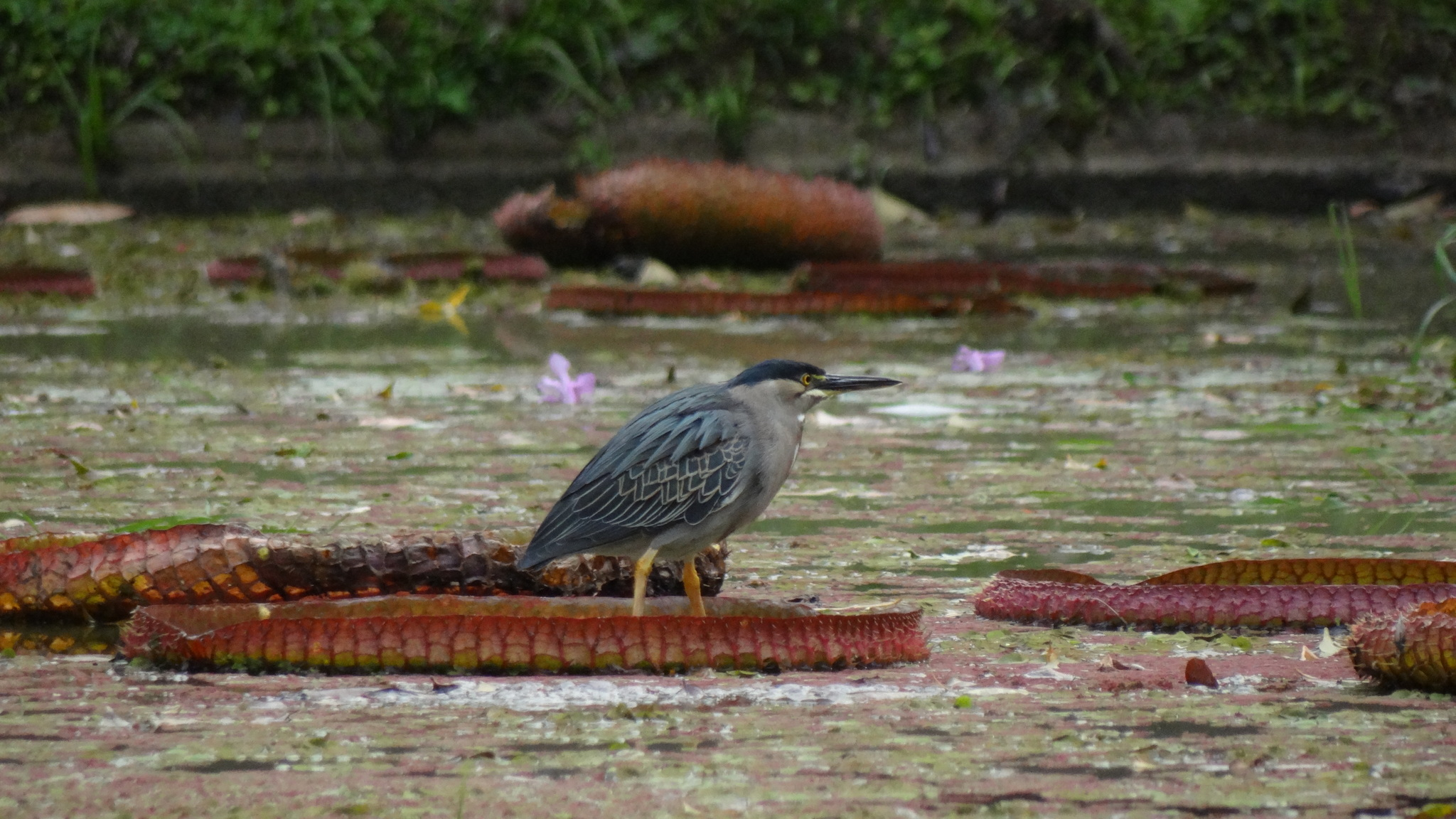
Standing still in a pond at the Rio de Janeiro Botanical Garden.

=== Food and feeding ===
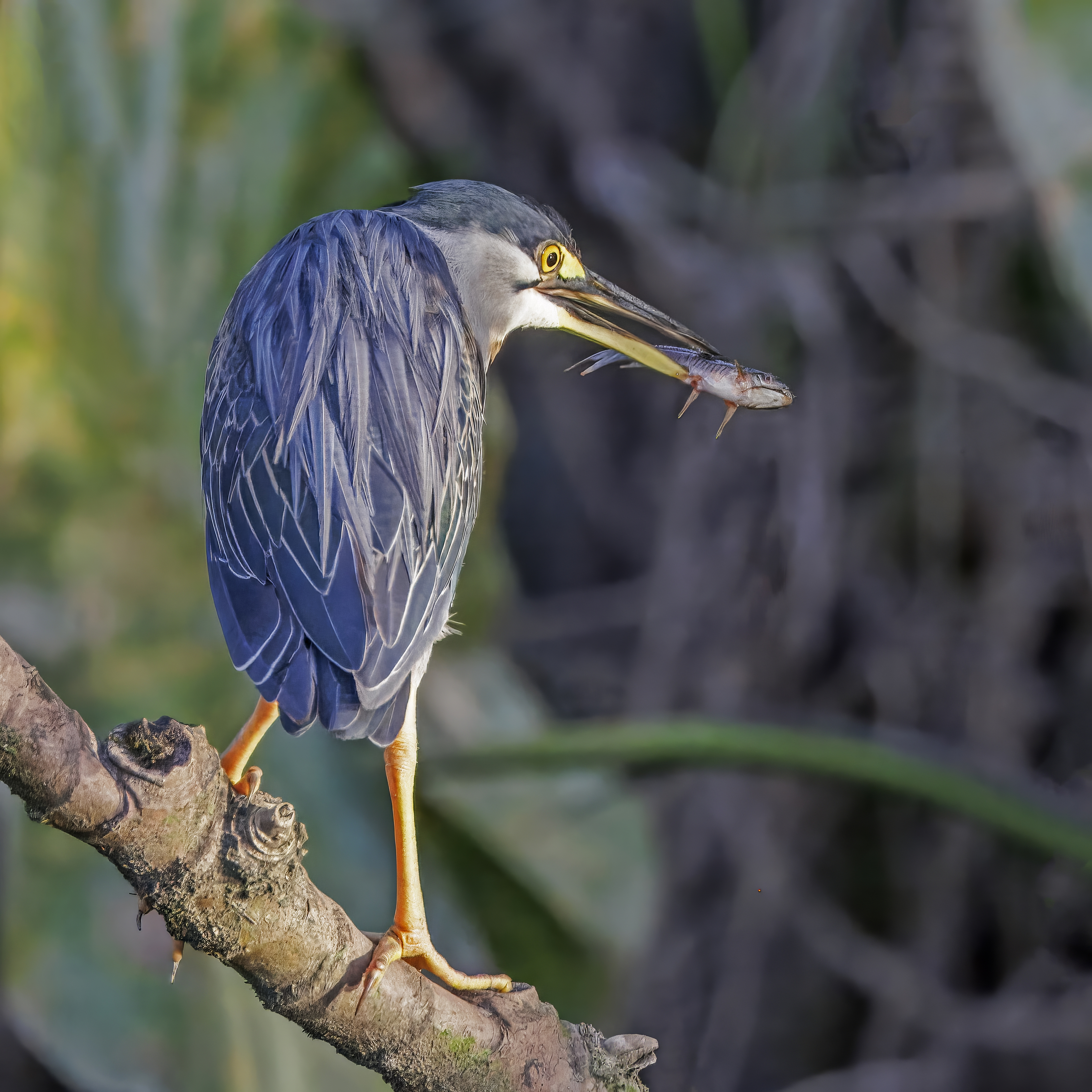
with a fish in Ecuador

These birds stand still at the water's edge and wait to ambush prey, but are easier to see than many small heron species. They mainly eat small fish, frogs and aquatic insects. They sometimes use bait, dropping a feather or leaf carefully on the water surface and picking fish that come to investigate.

=== Breeding ===
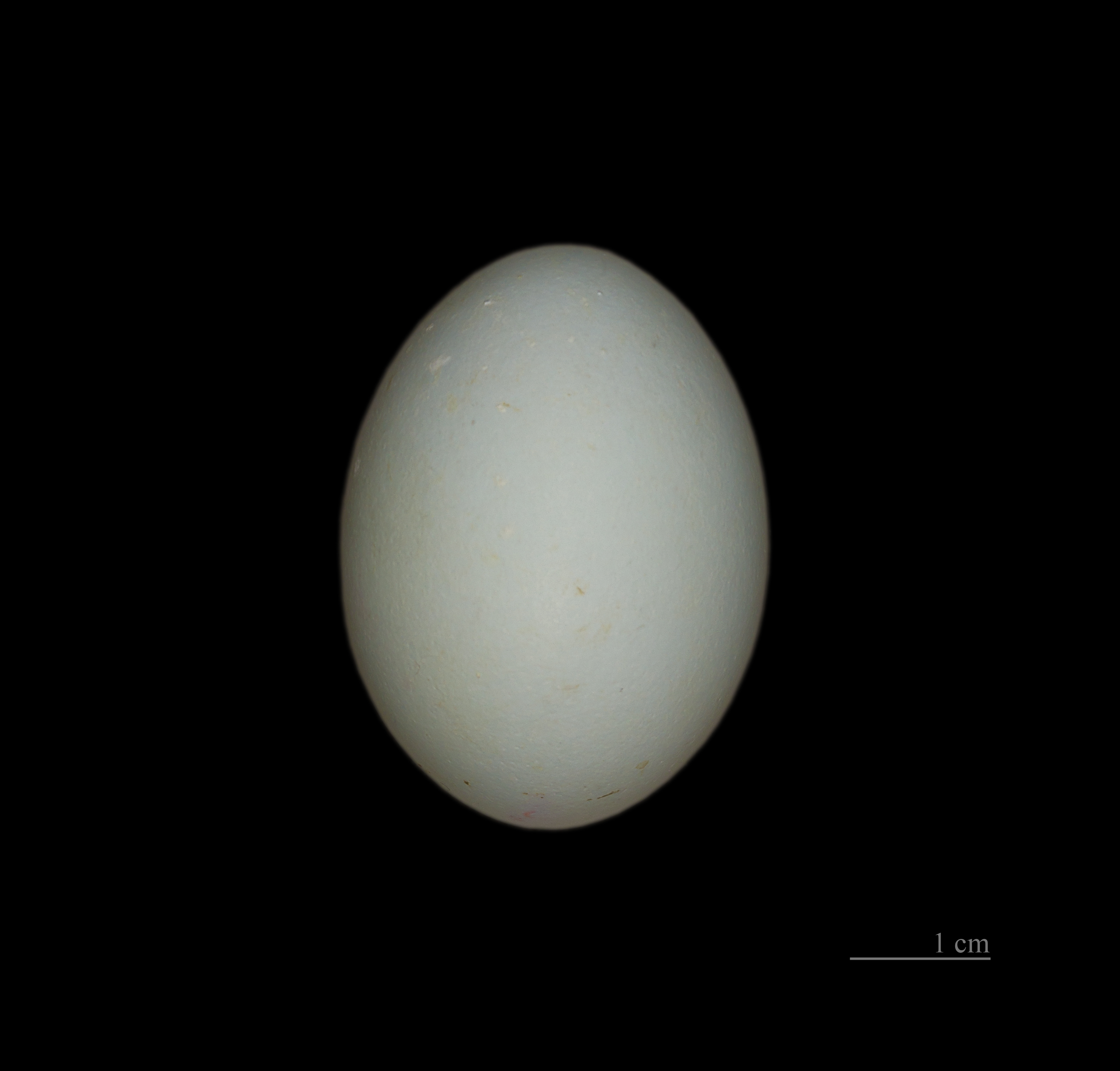
Egg, Muséum de Toulouse

The nest is a platform of sticks measuring between 20–40 cm long and 0.5–5 mm thick. The entire nest measures some 40–50 cm wide and 8–10 cm high outside, with an inner depression 20 cm wide and 4–5 cm deep. It is usually built in shrubs or trees but sometimes in sheltered locations on the ground, and often near water. The clutch is 2–5 eggs, which are pale blue and measure around 36 by 28 mm.

An adult bird was once observed in a peculiar and mysterious behaviour: while on the nest, it would grab a stick in its bill and make a rapid back-and-forth motion with the head, like a sewing machine's needle. The significance of this behaviour is completely unknown: While such movements occur in many other nesting birds where they seem to compact the nest, move the eggs, or dislodge parasites, none of those seem to have been the purpose in this particular case.

Young birds will give a display when they feel threatened, by stretching out their necks and pointing the bill skywards. How far this would deter predators is not known.

Widespread and generally common, the striated heron is classified as a species of least concern by the IUCN; this holds true whether the lava heron is included in Butorides striata or not.

== Sources ==
- Boswall, J. (1983): Tool-using and related behavior in birds: more notes. Avicultural Magazine 89: 94–108.
- Greeney, Harold F. & Merino M., Paúl A. (2006): Notes on breeding birds from the Cuyabeno Faunistic Reserve in northeastern Ecuador. Boletín de la Sociedad Antioqueña de Ornitología 16(2): 46–57. PDF fulltext
- Norris, D. (1975): Green Heron (Butorides virescens) uses feather lure for fishing. American Birds 29: 652–654.
- Robinson, S.K. (1994): Use of bait and lures by Green-backed Herons in Amazonian Peru. Wilson Bulletin 106(3): 569–571
- Walsh, J.F.; Grunewald, J. & Grunewald, B. (1985): Green-backed Herons (Butorides striatus) possibly using a lure and using apparent bait. J. Ornithol. 126: 439–442.
- Wiles, Gary J.; Worthington, David J.; Beck, Robert E. Jr.; Pratt, H. Douglas; Aguon, Celestino F. & Pyle, Robert L. (2000): Noteworthy Bird Records for Micronesia, with a Summary of Raptor Sightings in the Mariana Islands, 1988–1999. Micronesica 32(2): 257–284. PDF fulltext
- VanderWerf, Eric A.; Wiles, Gary J.; Marshall, Ann P. & Knecht, Melia (2006): Observations of migrants and other birds in Palau, April–May 2005, including the first Micronesian record of a Richard's Pipit. Micronesica 39(1): 11–29. PDF fulltext
