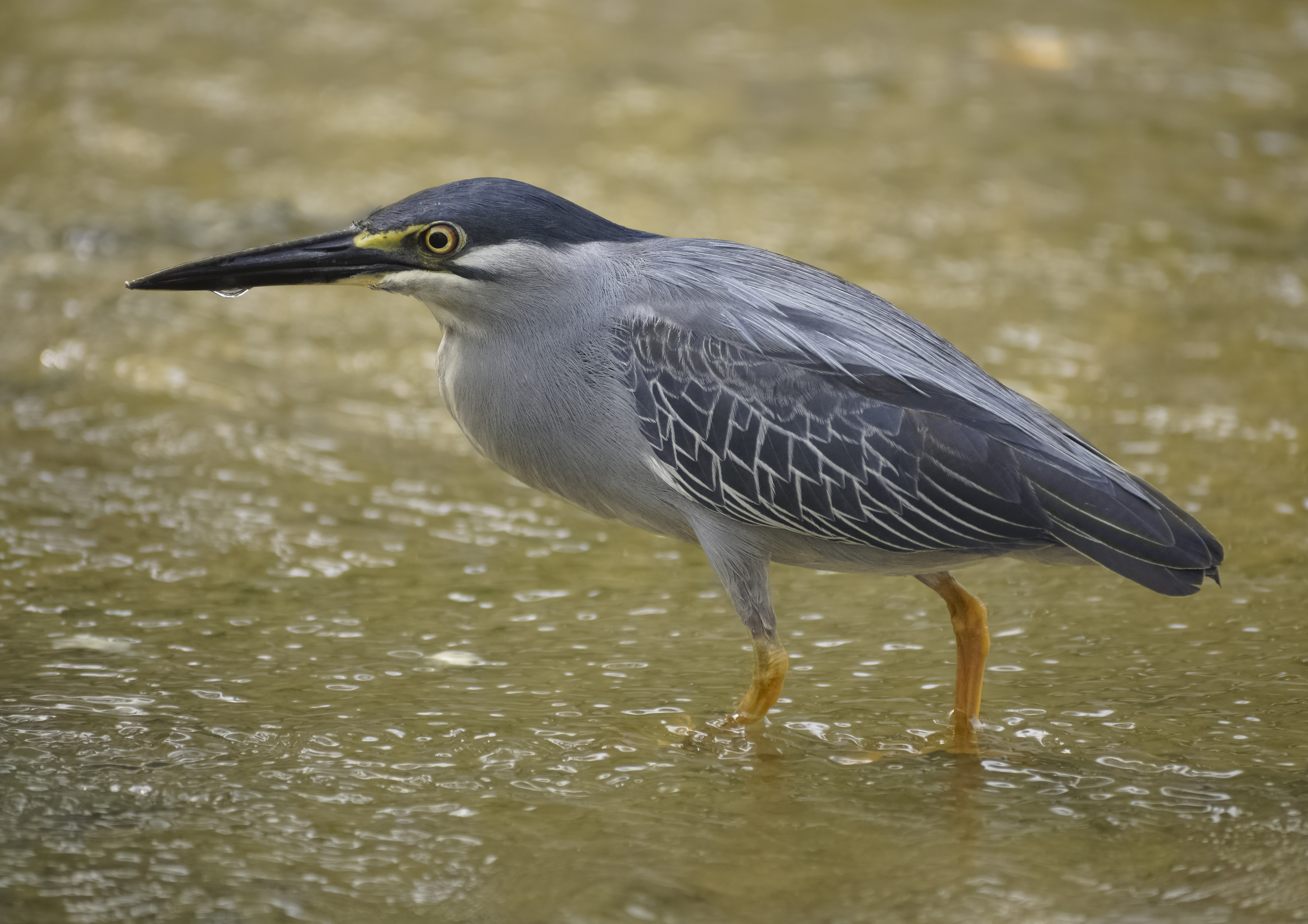
- Little heron Butorides atricapilla, Malaysia

Scientific classification
- Kingdom: Animalia
- Phylum: Chordata
- Class: Aves
- Order: Pelecaniformes
- Family: Ardeidae
- Subfamily: Ardeinae
- Genus: Butorides; Blyth, 1852

Type species
- Ardea javanica = Butorides atricapilla javanica Horsfield, 1821

= Butorides =

Butorides Temporal range: Early Pleistocene to present

Genus of birds

Butorides is a genus of small herons. It contains four similar species, the striated heron Butorides striata, the lava heron Butorides sundevalli, the green heron Butorides virescens and the little heron Butorides atricapilla. They are closely related, and some authorities have considered them all to be subspecies of just one species; when treated so, the merged species is called green-backed heron. The name Butorides derives from Middle English Butor ("bittern") and the Ancient Greek suffix -oides, "resembling".

Adults of the extant species are among the smallest herons, ranging in length from 35–48 centimetres (14–19 inches), and have a dark grey to blackish back and wings (sometimes with greenish or bluish iridescence), a black cap, and short legs; the legs are yellow most of the year, but flush bright orange-red during pre-breeding courtship. The species have different underpart colours; white to grey or orange-buff in striated heron, and very dark grey in lava heron, and red-brown in green heron; in all, there is a line of white streaks running down the front of the throat and breast. The juveniles are browner above and extensively streaked below, and have greenish-yellow legs.

Butorides herons breed in small wetlands, building a nest from platform of sticks, often in shrubs or trees, sometimes on the ground. The female lays three to five eggs. Both parents incubate for about 20 days until hatching, and feed the young birds, which take a further three weeks to fledge. They stand still at the water's edge and wait to ambush prey. They mainly eat small fish, frogs and aquatic insects. They are known to drop lures on the water surface to attract fish.

A fossil species, Butorides validipes, is known from the Early Pleistocene of Florida in the United States.

== Taxonomy ==
The genus Butorides was introduced in 1852 by the English zoologist Edward Blyth to accommodate a single species, Ardea javanica Horsfield, which is therefore becomes the type species. Ardea javanica is now considered to be a subspecies of the little heron (Butorides atricapill). The genus name is combines the genus Butor introduced by Thomas Forster in 1827 for the bitterns with the Ancient Greek -οιδης/-oidēs meaning "resembling". Butor is the Middle English word for a bittern. Within the heron family Ardeidae, Butorides is most closely related to the genus Ardeola (pond herons).

The Butorides herons were formerly considered a single species, the green-backed heron, but are now normally split, with the green heron breeding in eastern North America, Central America, the West Indies and the Pacific coast of Canada and the United States, the striated heron in South America, and the little heron in the Old World tropics and warm temperate regions from west Africa to Japan.

A molecular phylogenetic study of the genus Butorides, submitted as a master's thesis in 2023, found that the striated heron was paraphyletic. To resolve the paraphyly, twenty subspecies of the striated heron were moved to a new species, the little heron, making the striated heron a monotypic species restricted to South America.

The following cladogram shows the phylogenetic relationships between the species:

- Butorides
  - Butorides atricapilla – little heron
  - - Butorides striata – striated heron
    - - Butorides sundevalli – lava heron
      - Butorides virescens – green heron

The genus contains four species:

Genus Butorides – Blyth, 1852 – four species
Common name	Scientific name and subspecies	Range	Size and ecology	IUCN status and estimated population
Little heron	Butorides atricapilla (Afzelius, 1804) Twenty subspecies: B. a. atricapilla (Afzelius, 1804) – Africa south of the Sahara; B. a. brevipes (Hemprich & Ehrenberg, 1833) – Somalia and the Red Sea coasts; B. a. crawfordi Nicoll, 1906– Aldabra and Amirante groups (south, central Seychelles); B. a. rhizophorae Salomonsen, 1934 – Comoros; B. a. rutenbergi (Hartlaub, 1880) – Madagascar and Réunion; B. a. degens Hartert, EJO, 1920 – northeast Seychelles; B. a. albolimbata Reichenow, 1900 – Chagos Archipelago and Maldives; B. a. amurensis (Schrenck, 1860) – southeast Siberia, northeast China and Japan; B. a. actophila Oberholser, 1912 – east China to north Myanmar and north Vietnam; B. a. javanica (Horsfield, 1821) – Pakistan, India and Sri Lanka to Thailand, Philippines, the Greater Sunda Islands and Sulawesi; B. a. spodiogaster Sharpe, 1894 – Andaman and Nicobar Islands and islands off west Sumatra; B. a. steini Mayr, 1943 – Lesser Sunda Islands; B. a. moluccarum Hartert, EJO, 1920 – Moluccas; B. a. papuensis Mayr, 1940 – northwest New Guinea; B. a. idenburgi Rand, 1941 – north New Guinea; B. a. flyensis Salomonsen, 1966 – central south, southeast New Guinea; B. a. stagnatilis (Gould, 1848) – coastal northwest, central north Australia; B. a. macrorhyncha (Gould, 1848) – east, northeast Australia and New Caledonia; B. a. solomonensis Mayr, 1940 – New Hanover Island to Solomon Islands (except Rennell Island), and Vanuatu to Fiji (southwest Polynesia); B. a. patruelis (Peale, 1849) – Tahiti (Society Islands)	Old World tropics from west Africa to Japan and Australia	Size: Habitat: Diet:	
Striated heron	Butorides striata (Linnaeus, 1758)	East Panama to north Argentina, Bolivia and Chile	Size: Habitat: Diet:	LC
Lava heron	Butorides sundevalli (Reichenow, 1877)	Galápagos Islands	Size: Habitat: Diet:	
Green heron	Butorides virescens (Linnaeus, 1758) Four subspecies: B. v. virescens (Linnaeus, 1758); B. v. bahamensis (Brewster, 1888); B. v. anthonyi (Mearns, 1895); B. v. frazari (Brewster, 1888)	Canada and the United States south to Panama	Size: Habitat: Diet:	LC
