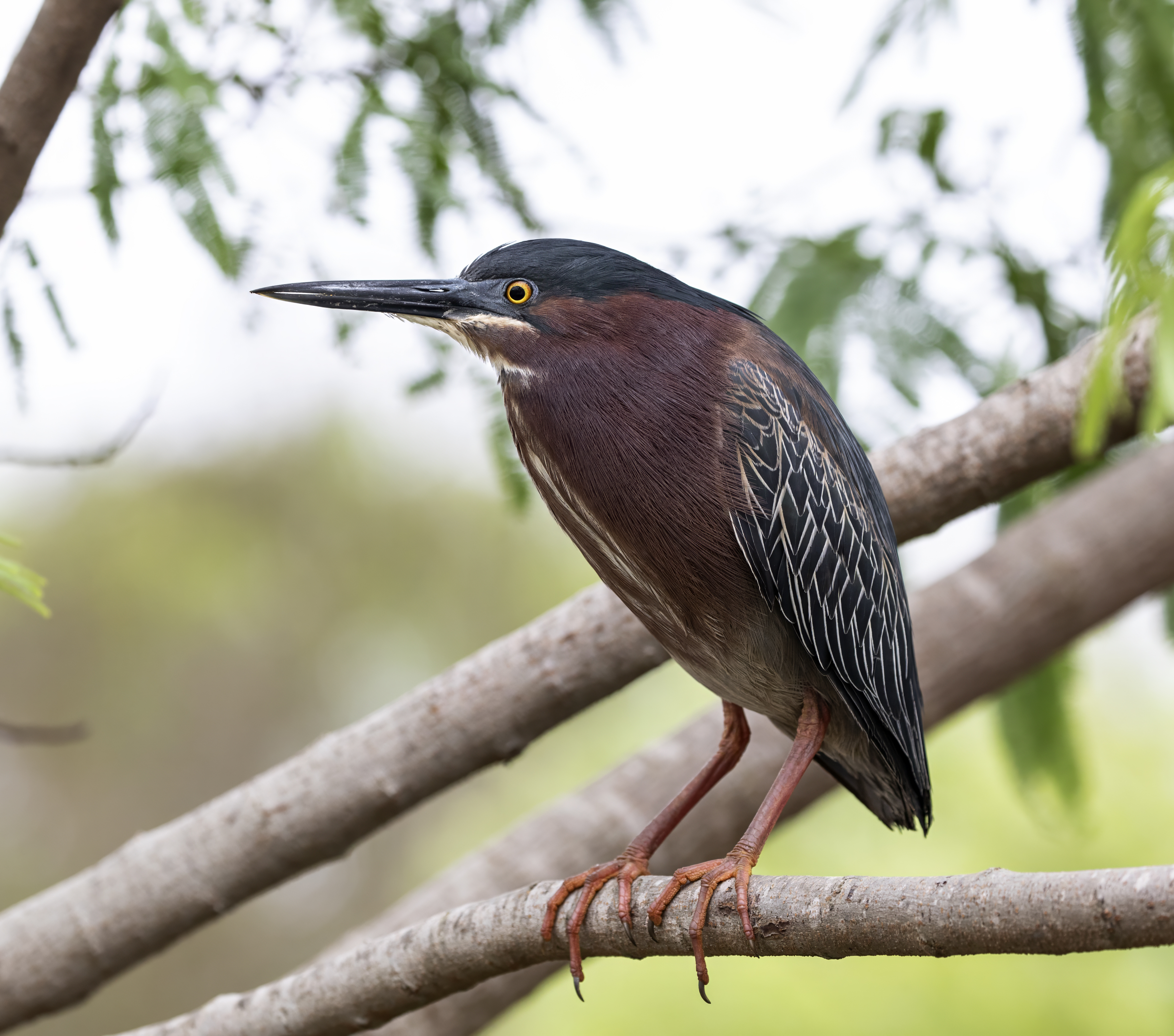
- A Green Heron perched near the Laguna Madre in South Padre Island, Texas.

Conservation status
- Least Concern (IUCN 3.1)

Scientific classification
- Kingdom: Animalia
- Phylum: Chordata
- Class: Aves
- Order: Pelecaniformes
- Family: Ardeidae
- Genus: Butorides
- Species: B. virescens

Binomial name
- Butorides virescens (Linnaeus, 1758)
- Range of B. virescens Breeding range Year-round range Wintering range

Synonyms
- Ardea virescens Linnaeus, 1758; See text.

Audio
- Call

= Green heron =

Green heron Temporal range: Pleistocene–present

Species of bird

The green heron (Butorides virescens) is a small heron of North and Central America. Butorides is from Middle English butor "bittern" and Ancient Greek -oides, "resembling", and virescens is Latin for "greenish".

It was long considered conspecific with its sister species the striated heron (Butorides striata); when treated together, they were called "green-backed heron".

== Description ==
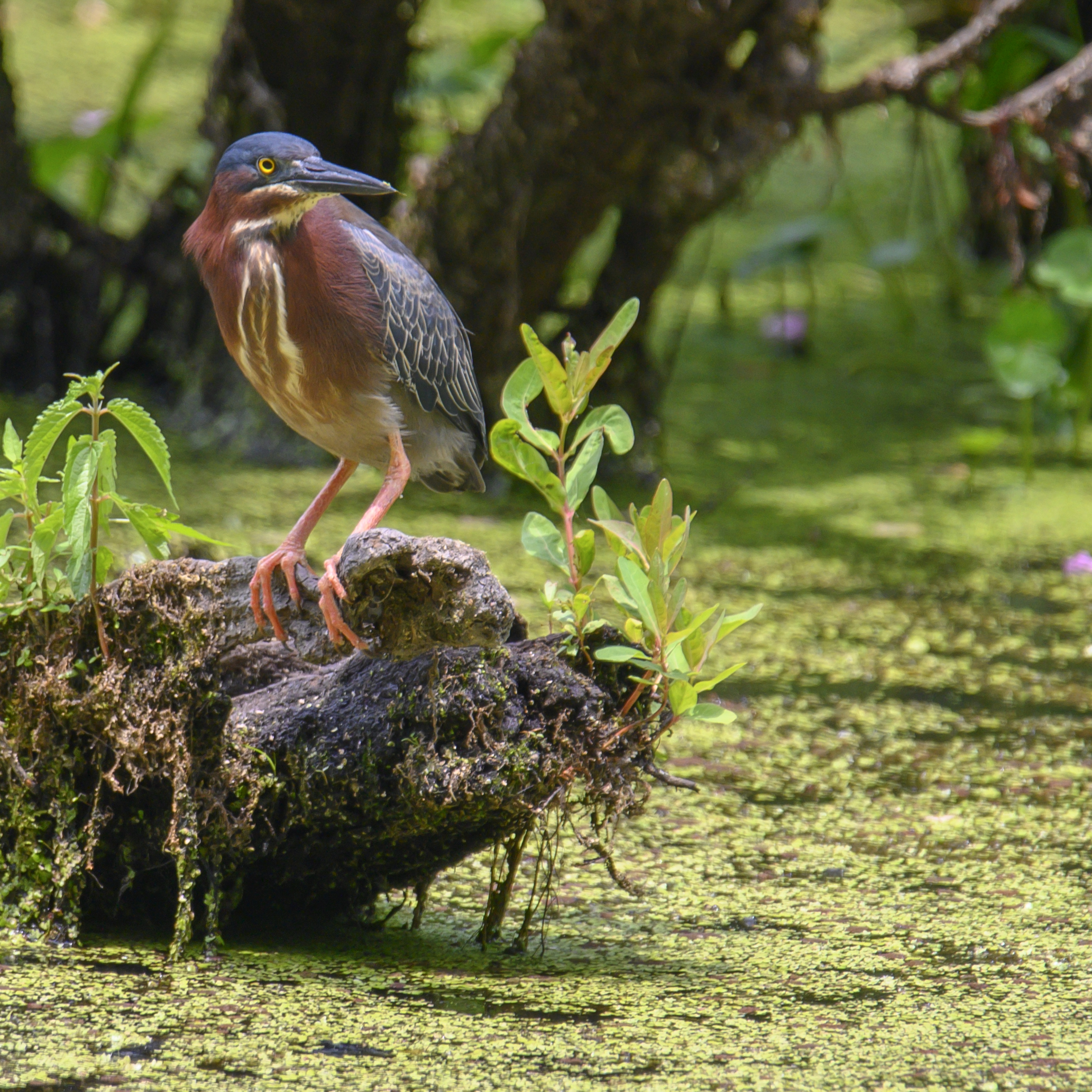
Front view showing the neck stripes

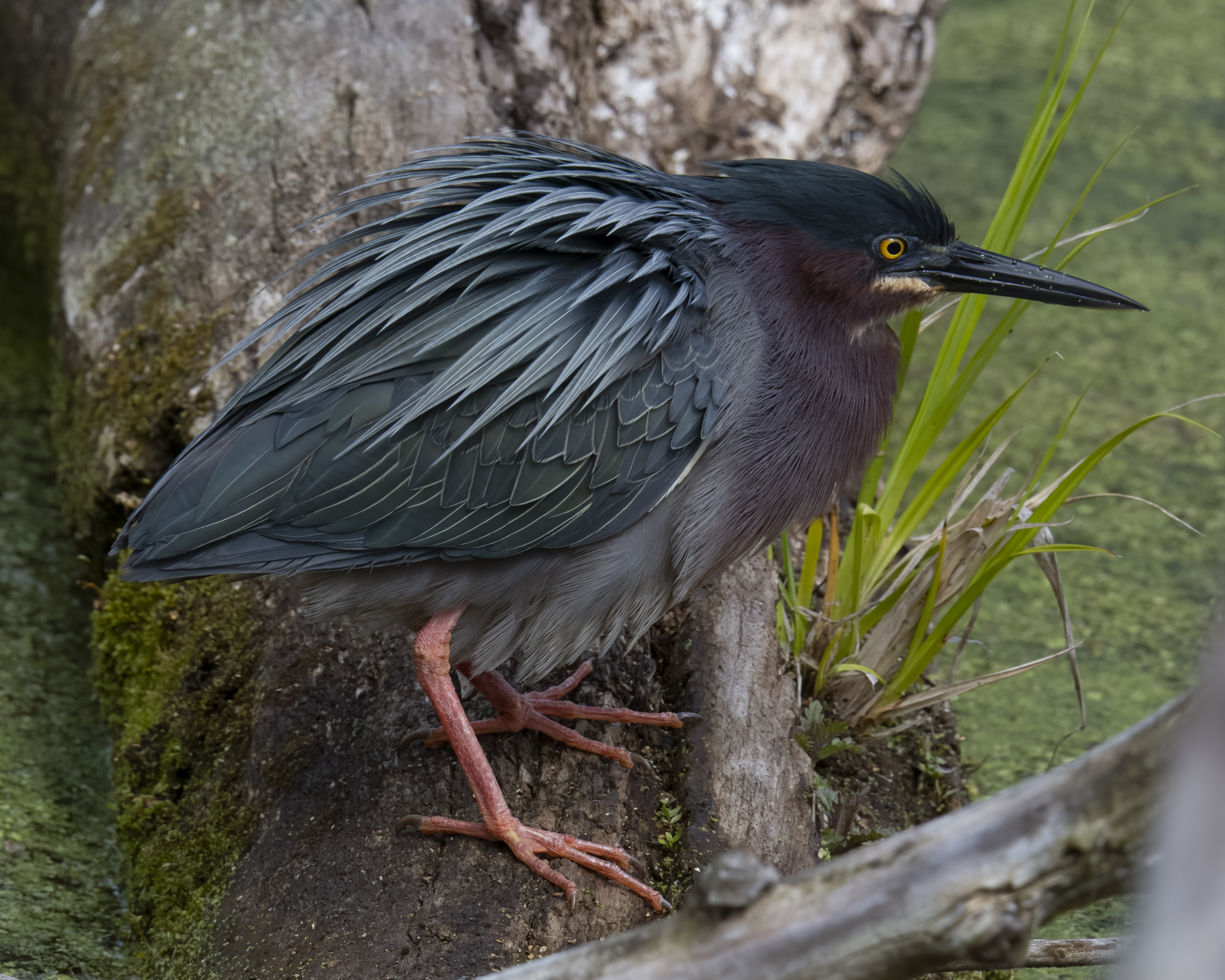
The feathers on their wings and back are dark, with green iridescence

The green heron is a relatively small heron; adult body length is about 44 cm (17 in). The neck is often pulled in tight against the body. Adults have a glossy, greenish-black cap, an iridescent greenish back and wings that are gray-black grading into green or blue, a chestnut neck with a pair or more of white lines down the front, gray underparts and short yellow legs. The bill is dark with a long, sharp point. Female adults tend to be smaller than males, and have duller and lighter plumage, particularly in the breeding season. Juveniles are duller, with the head sides, neck and underparts streaked brown and white, tan-splotched back and wing coverts, and greenish-yellow legs and bill. Hatchlings are covered in down feathers, light gray above, and white on the belly.

The green heron's call is a loud and sudden kyow; it also makes a series of more subdued kuk calls. During courtship, the male gives a raah-rahh call with wide-open bill, makes noisy wingbeats and whoom-whoom-whoom calls in flight, and sometimes calls roo-roo to the female before landing again. While sitting, an aaroo-aaroo courtship call is also given.

Measurements:

- Length: 41–46 cm (16–18 in)
- Weight: 240 g (8.5 oz)
- Wingspan: 64–68 cm (25–27 in)

== Taxonomy ==
This species was formerly often included in B. striata, which at that time was usually cited with an erroneous masculine spelling "striatus", though the genus name is feminine.

Subspecies distinction is uncertain at best. The color variation between populations is less pronounced than between birds of the same population. Migratory populations are longer-winged than those resident year-round, but this cannot be used to delimit subspecies as it is a consequence of differing habits and can be expected to undergo convergent evolution in unrelated populations of this species that just share the same habits. Thus, thorough molecular phylogenetic studies would be required to resolve the question of subspecies delimitation.

The following four subspecies are generally accepted:

- Butorides virescens virescens (Linnaeus, 1758)

Breeds from southeastern Canada to central and southern US east of the Rocky Mountains, south through Central America to central Panama and the Caribbean islands. Northern populations migratory, wintering from southernmost US to northern South America.

- Butorides virescens bahamensis (Brewster, 1888)

Bahamas. Resident.

- Butorides virescens anthonyi (Mearns, 1895)

Breeds in the United States west of the Rocky Mountains, south to northern Baja California Peninsula, Mexico. Some resident, most migrate to western Mexico in winter.

- Butorides virescens frazari (Brewster, 1888)

Southern Baja California Peninsula, Mexico. Resident.

A further subspecies B. v. maculata (Boddaert, 1783) is generally treated as a synonym of B. v. virescens, but has been treated as distinct by some authors for Caribbean and Central American populations. The distinctness of this, the second taxon in this species to be described, is disputed. Some authors assemble the bulk of the mainland population in the nominate subspecies but treat the parapatric populations as distinct subspecies, while others place all resident populations in B. v. maculata and all migratory ones in B. v. virescens.

In Trinidad and Tobago and in central Panama, green heron overlaps slightly in range with the closely related striated heron and hybridizes with it; hybrids are intermediate between the two species, generally grayer below than typical green herons.

Birds of the nominate subspecies B. v. virescens are rare vagrants to western Europe; for example, a sighting in Pembrokeshire in 2018 was only the second recorded sighting in Wales. Individuals from the Pacific coast of North America may similarly stray as far as Hawaii.

The Early Pleistocene B. validipes, whose fossil remains were discovered in Florida, might have been the ancestor of the green heron as the living species seems to replace the extinct relative in the fossil record.

== Ecology ==
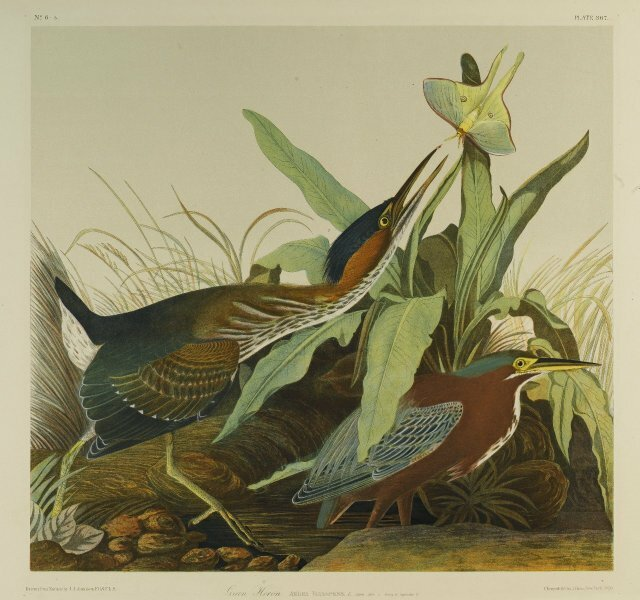
"Green heron" by John J. Audubon

The habitat and foraging area of the green heron includes riparian zones, wetlands, ponds, and lakes, as well as human-made canals and ditches. Green herons do not exhibit a particular preference for diurnal or nocturnal foraging, often engaging in both. Shore-living individuals adapt to the rhythm of the tides. They mainly eat small fish, frogs and aquatic arthropods, but may take any invertebrate or vertebrate prey they can catch, including such animals like leeches, earthworms, dragonflies, damselflies, waterbugs, grasshoppers, spiders, crayfish, prawns, mice, other rodents, lizards, tadpoles and snakes. Some of the many fish eaten are minnows, sunfish, catfish, perch, eels and, in urban areas, goldfish. Green herons are intolerant of other birds (including conspecifics) when feeding, and are not seen to forage in groups. They typically stand still on shore or in shallow water or perch upon branches and await prey. They are able to hover briefly to catch prey. Green herons have been observed using captured prey (e.g. mayflies) or other objects (bread, feathers) to "bait-fish", using a lure on the water's surface to attract fish. This bait-fishing behavior is common among herons.

The northern population moves to its breeding ranges during March and April; near the northernmost limit of the green heron's range, breeding is well underway by the end of May. The migration to the winter quarters starts in September; by late October, the birds are absent from regions where they do not stay all year. At least the northward migration has not currently adapted to global warming; birds appear in their breeding ranges at the same time they did 100 years ago.

Individuals of non-migratory populations abandon their territories after breeding season to roam about the region. They may or may not return to the previous year's breeding location, depending on whether they found better habitat during these wanderings. In these populations, the breeding season is determined by rainfall and consequent prey availability.

Green herons are seasonally monogamous. The pairs form in the breeding range, after an intense courtship display by the males, who select the nesting sites and fly in front of the female noisily and with puffed-up head and neck plumage. They nest in forest and swamp patches, over water or in plants near water. Nests are a platform of sticks, often in shrubs or trees, sometimes on the ground. Locations in trees are preferred, with some nests built up to 20 m (66 ft) off the ground although heights of several meters are more common. Rarely, large numbers of these birds congregate in heronries for nesting.

The clutch is usually 2–6 pale green eggs, which are laid in two-day intervals (though the second egg may be laid up to six days later than the first). After the last egg has been laid, both parents incubate for about 19–21 days until hatching, and feed the young birds. The frequency of feedings decreases as the offspring near fledging. The young sometimes start to leave the nest at 16 days of age, but are not fully fledged and able to fend for themselves until 30–35 days old. Sometimes, particularly in the tropical parts of its range, the green heron breeds twice a year.

== Tool use ==
Green herons are one of the few species of bird known to use tools. In particular, they commonly use bread crusts, insects, or other items as bait. The bait is dropped onto the surface of a body of water to lure fish. When a fish takes the bait, the green heron then grabs and eats the fish.

== Gallery ==
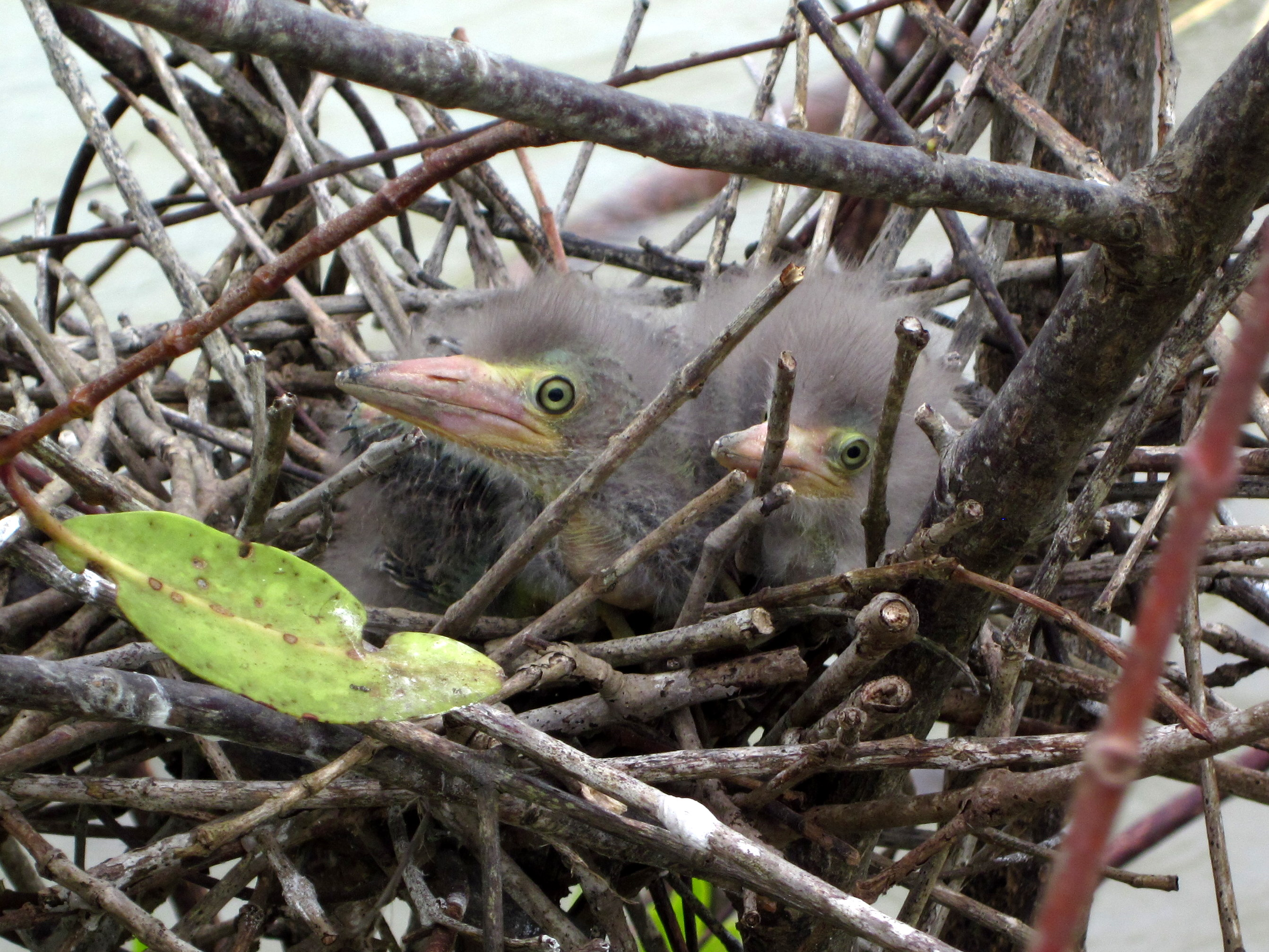
Nestlings

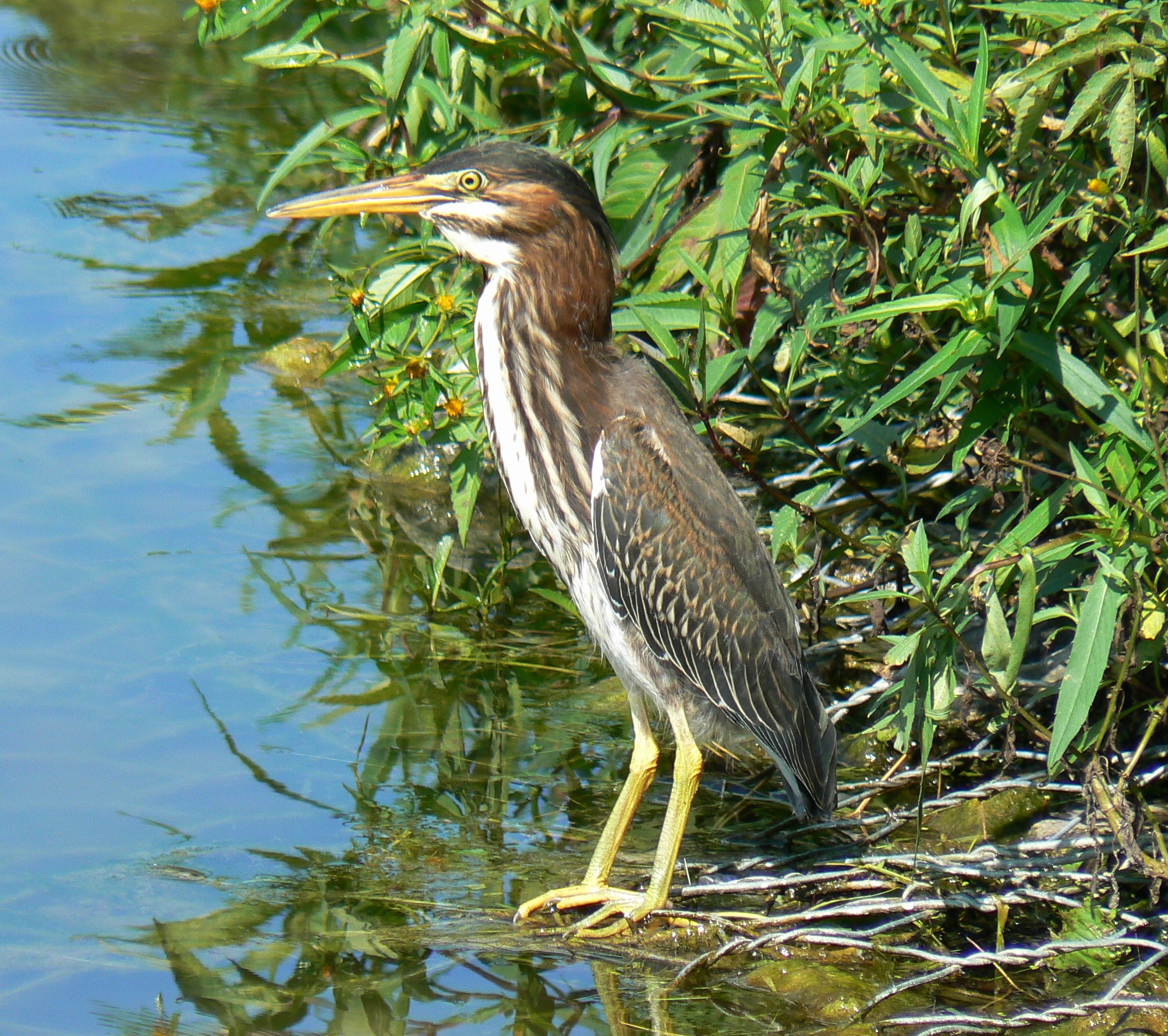
Subadult retaining some juvenile plumage

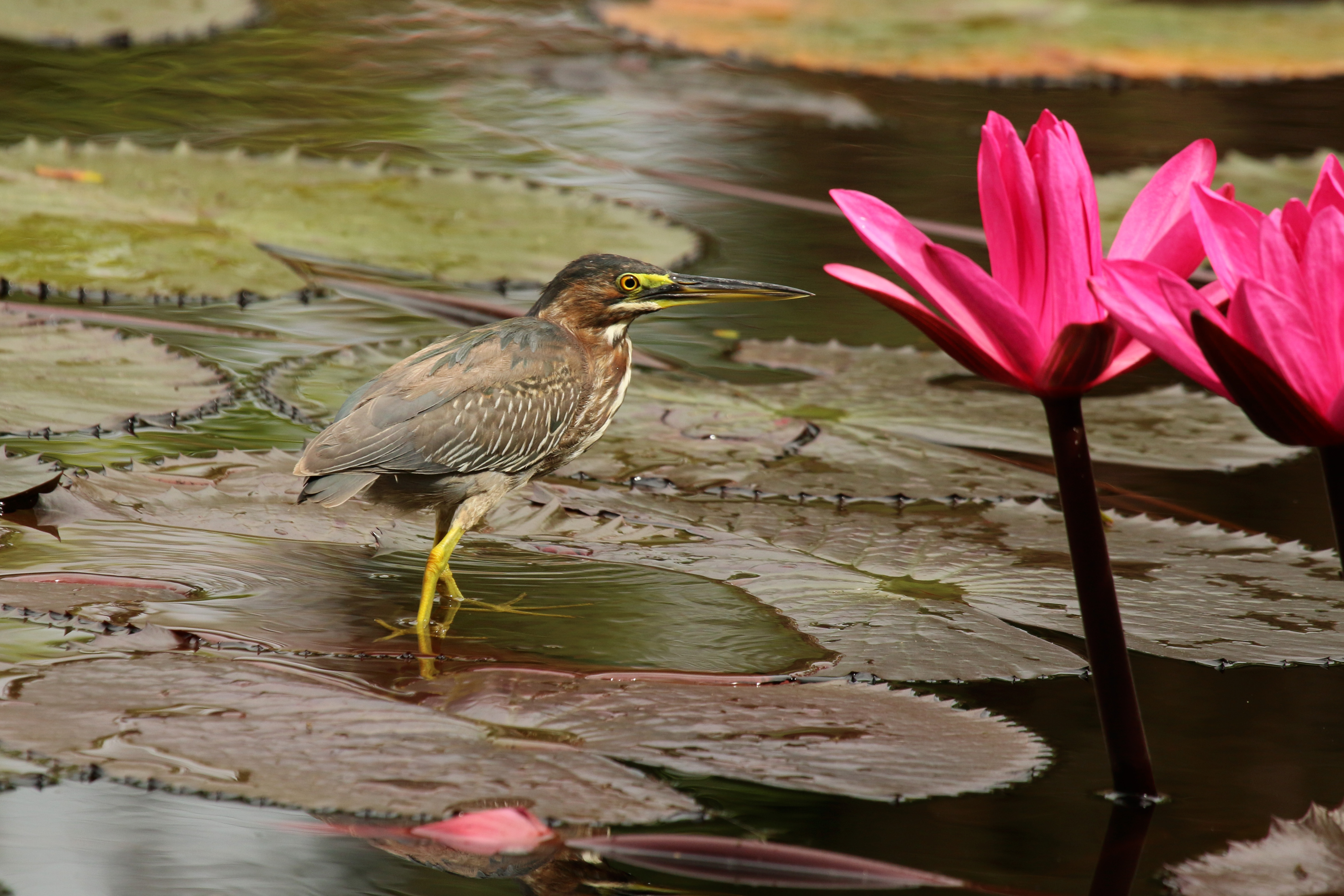
Young adult B. v. virescens

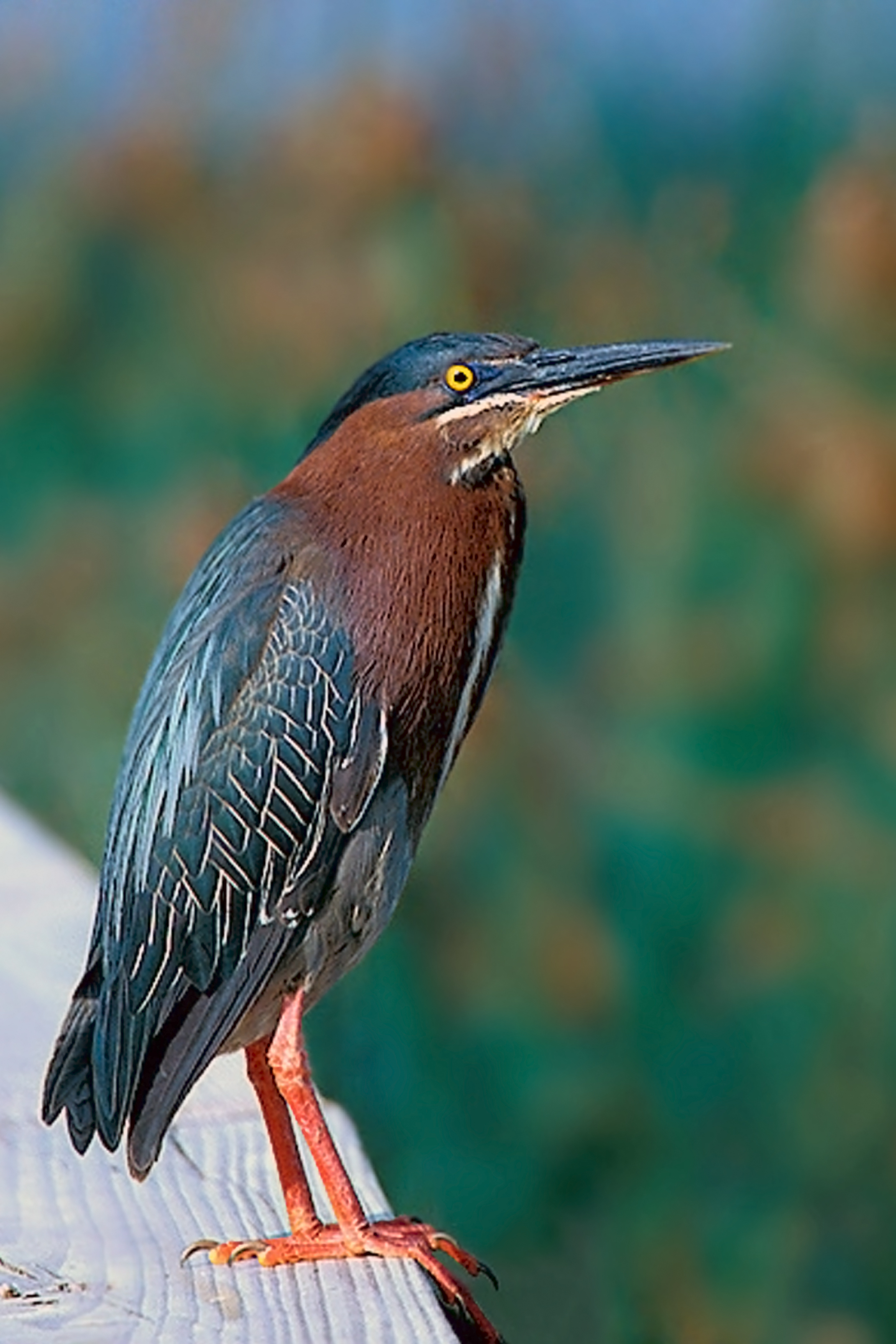
Breeding plumage, with neck retracted

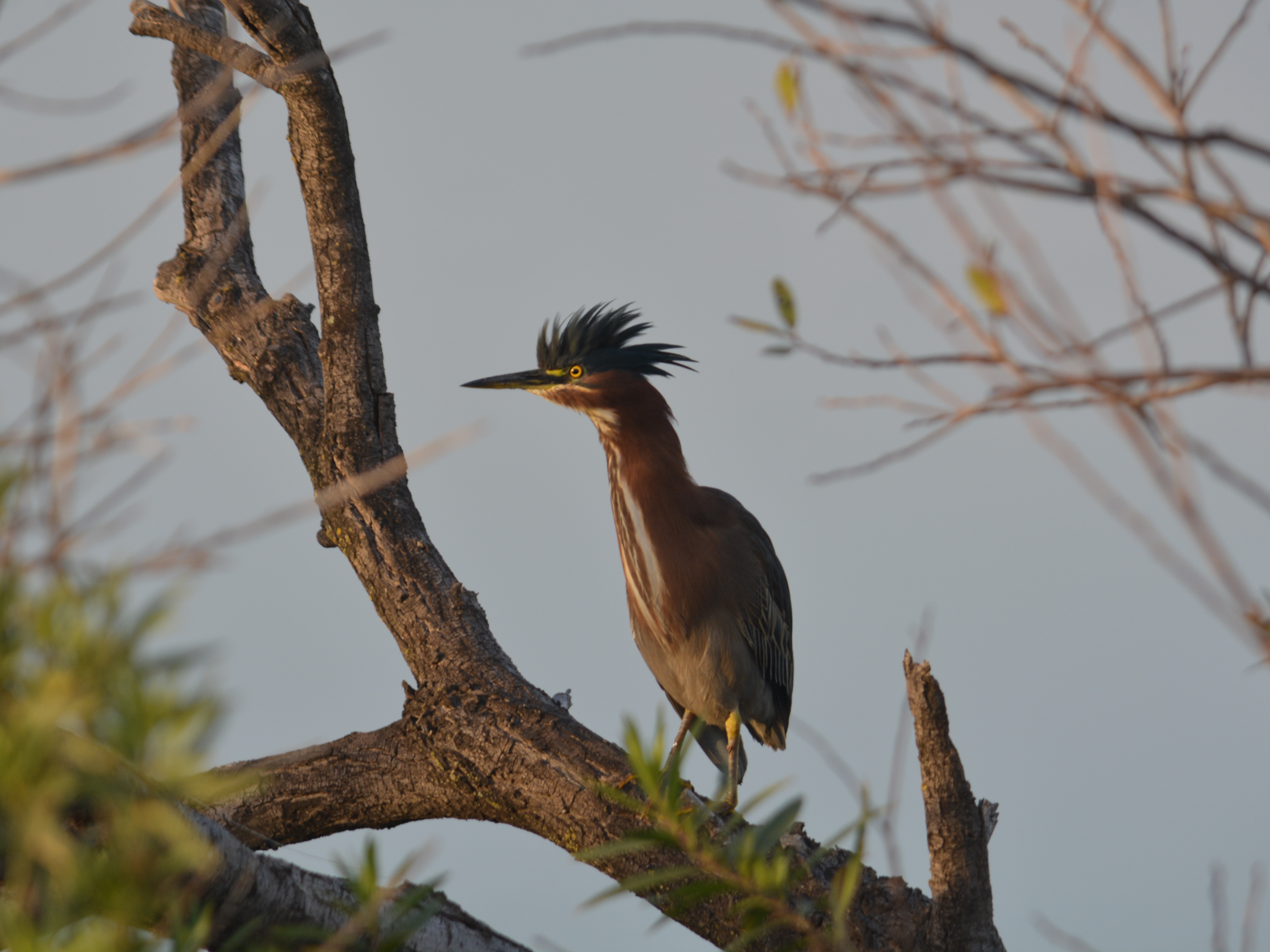
Adult

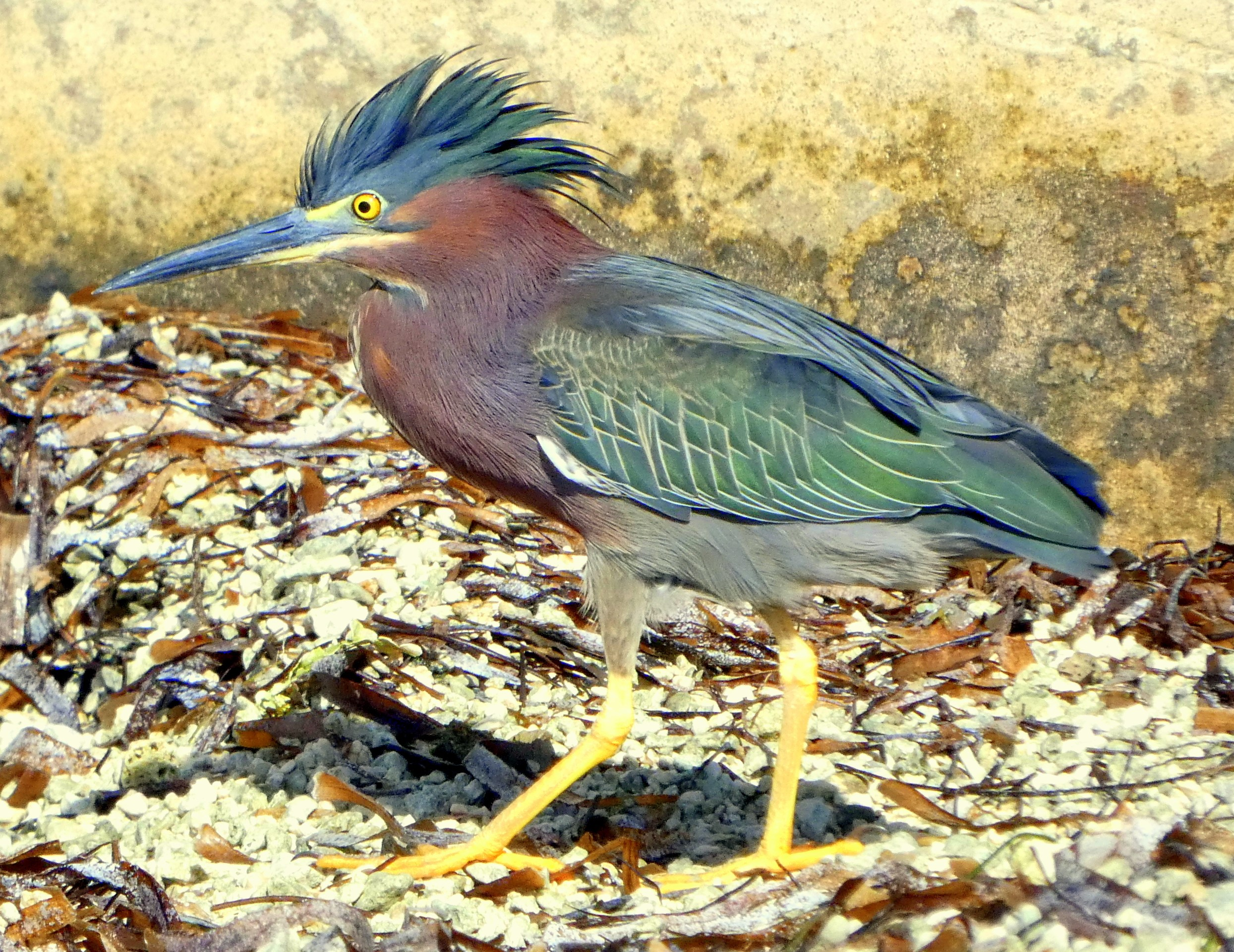
Adult

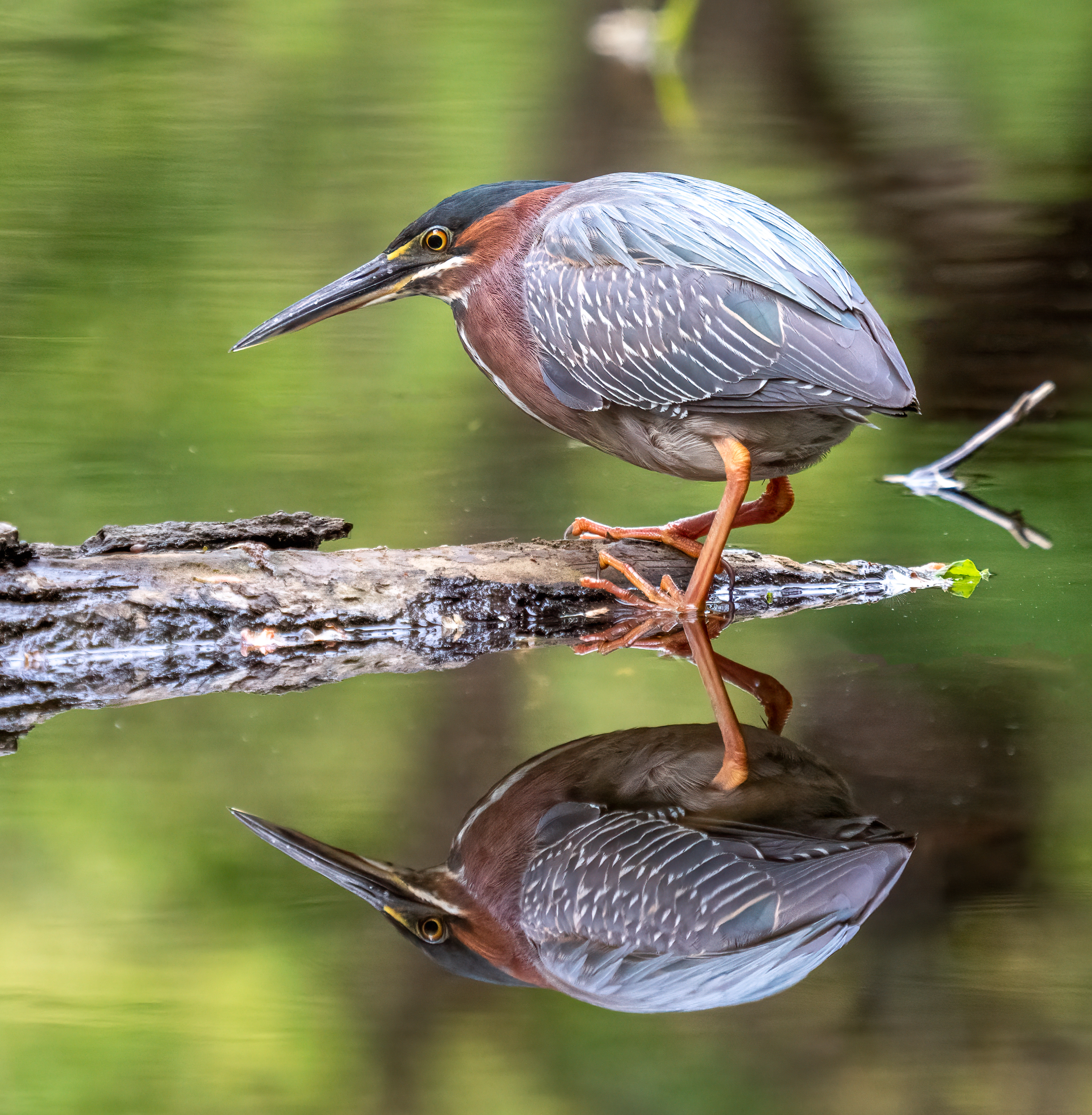
Hunting in New York

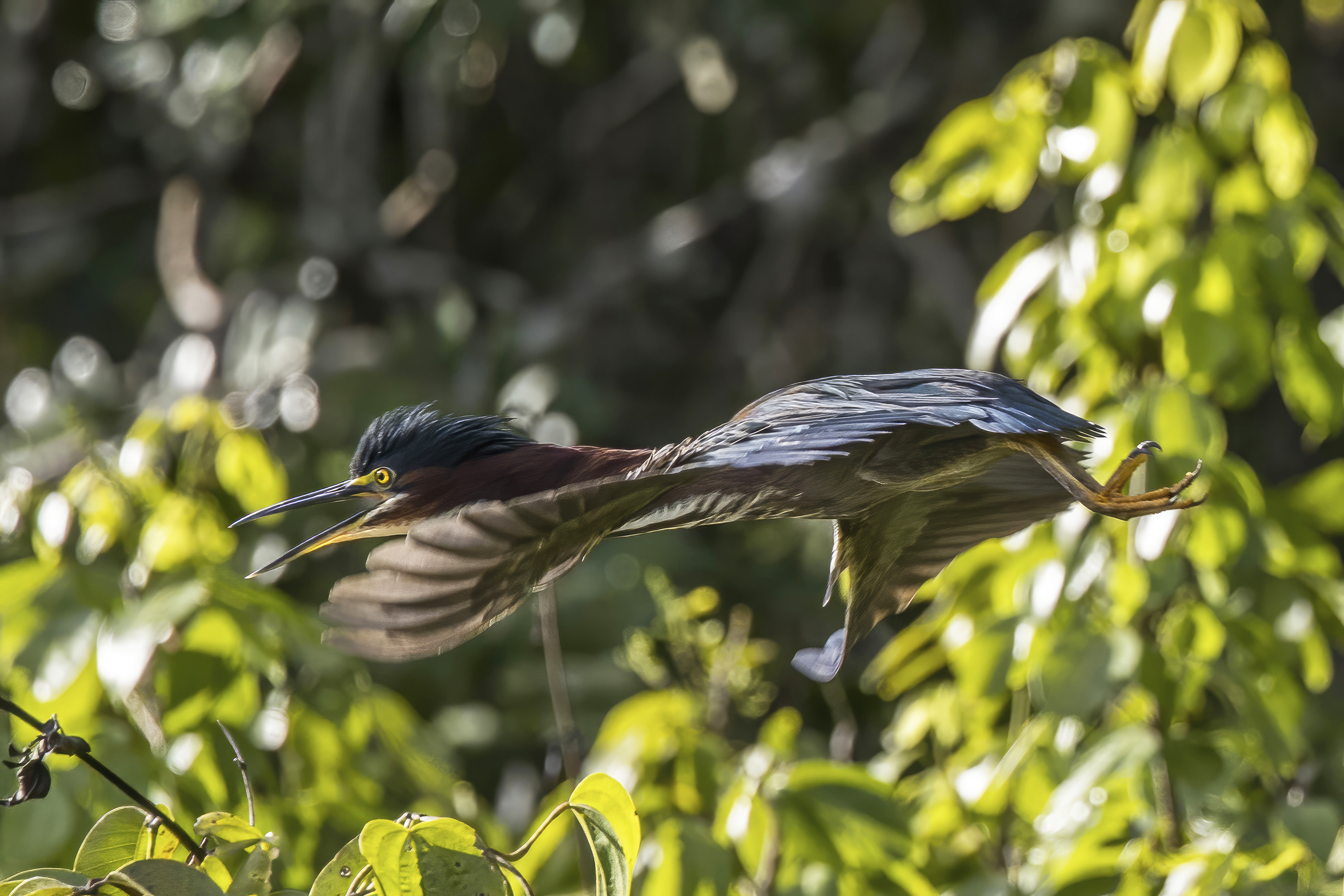
in Guatemala

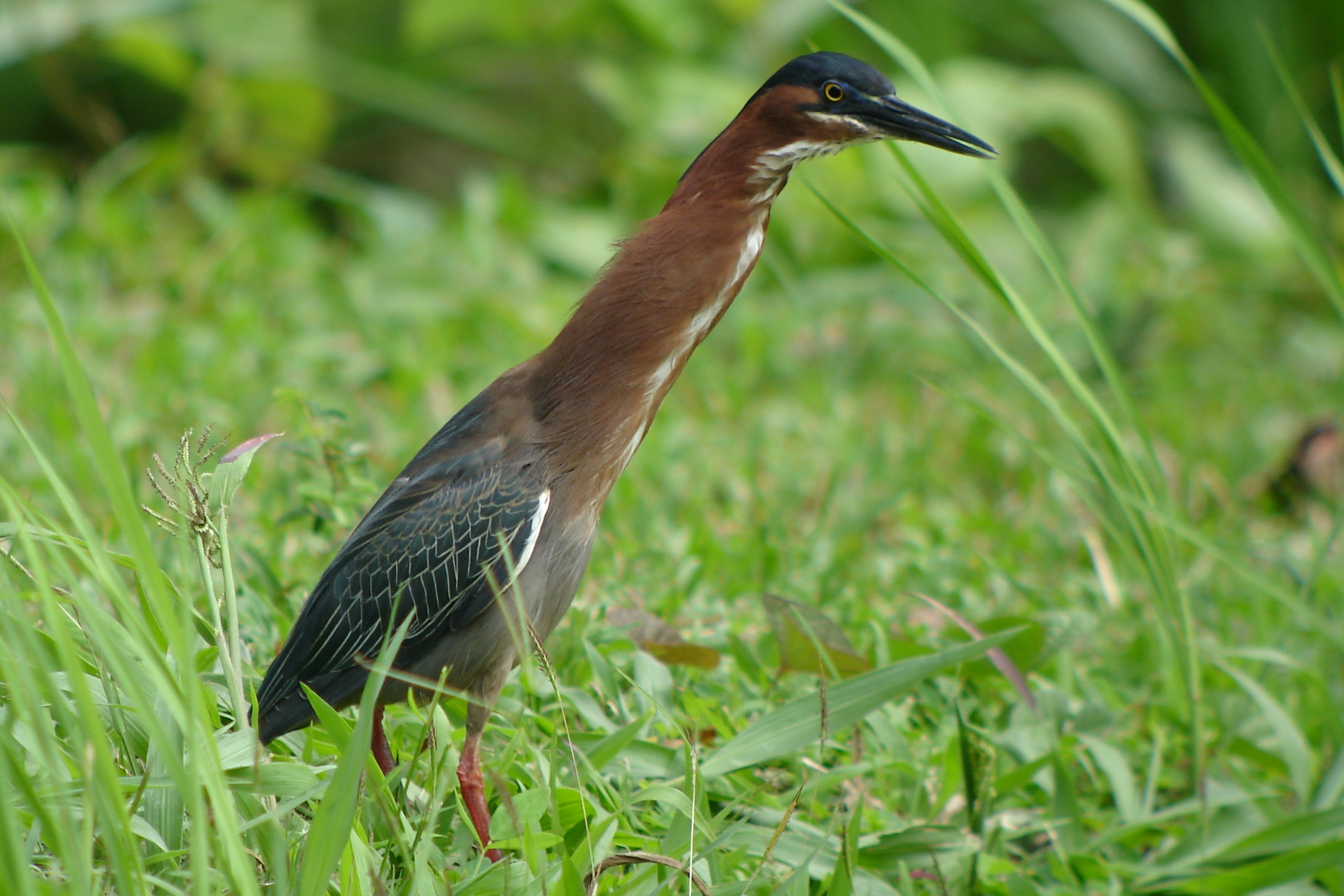
Hunting with neck extended

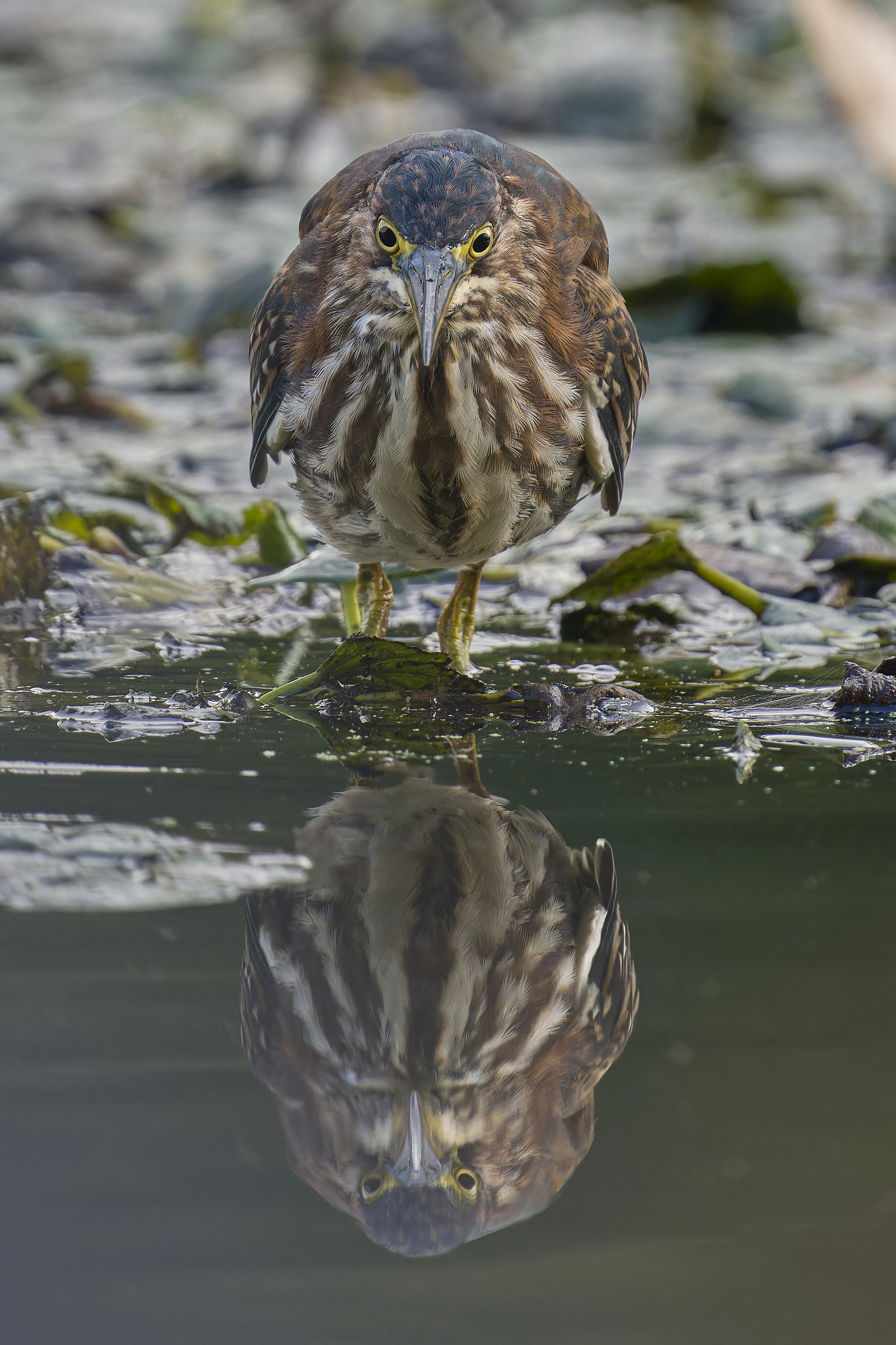
Juvenile, Glastonbury, CT USA

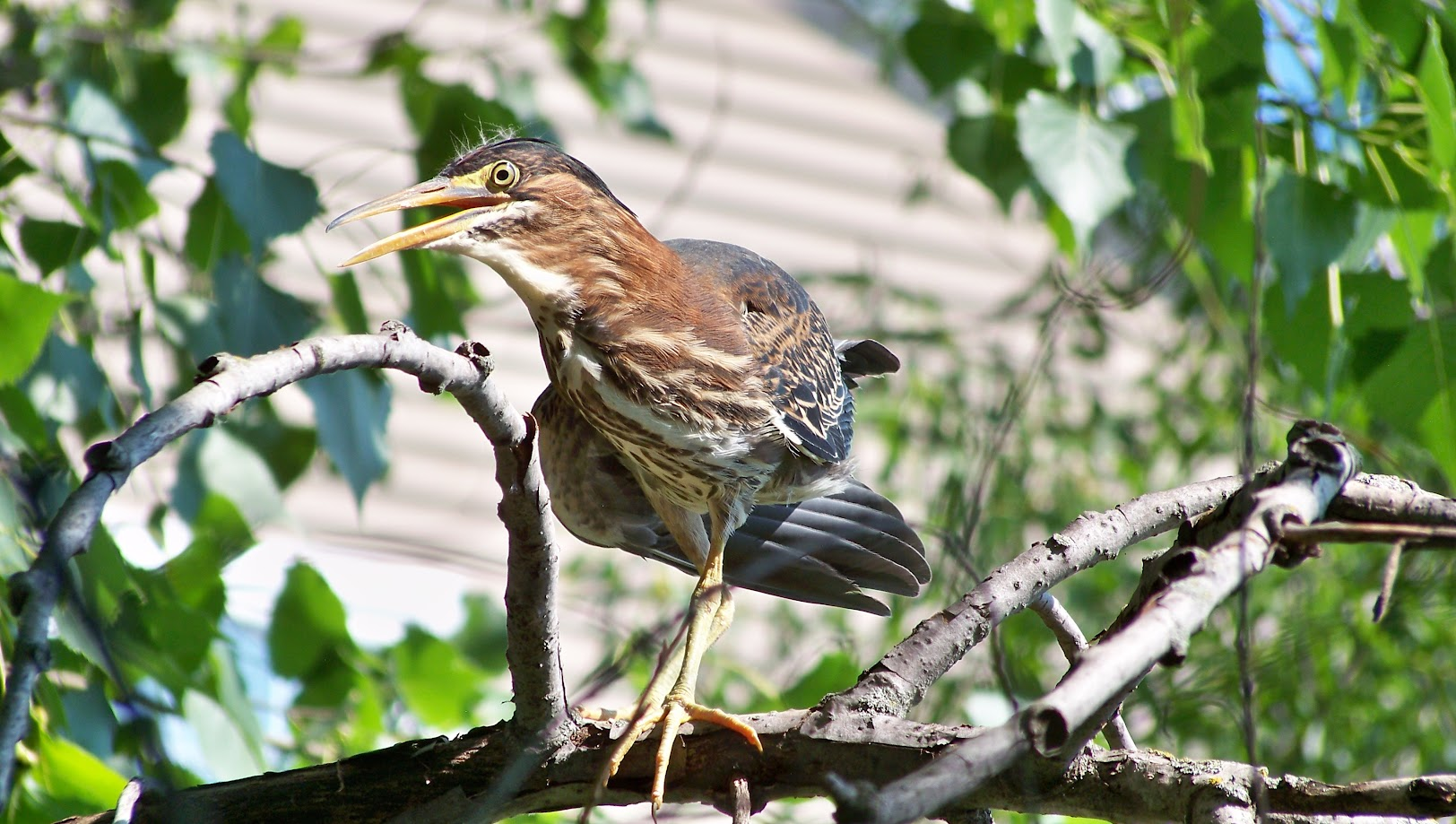
Subadult in Minnesota

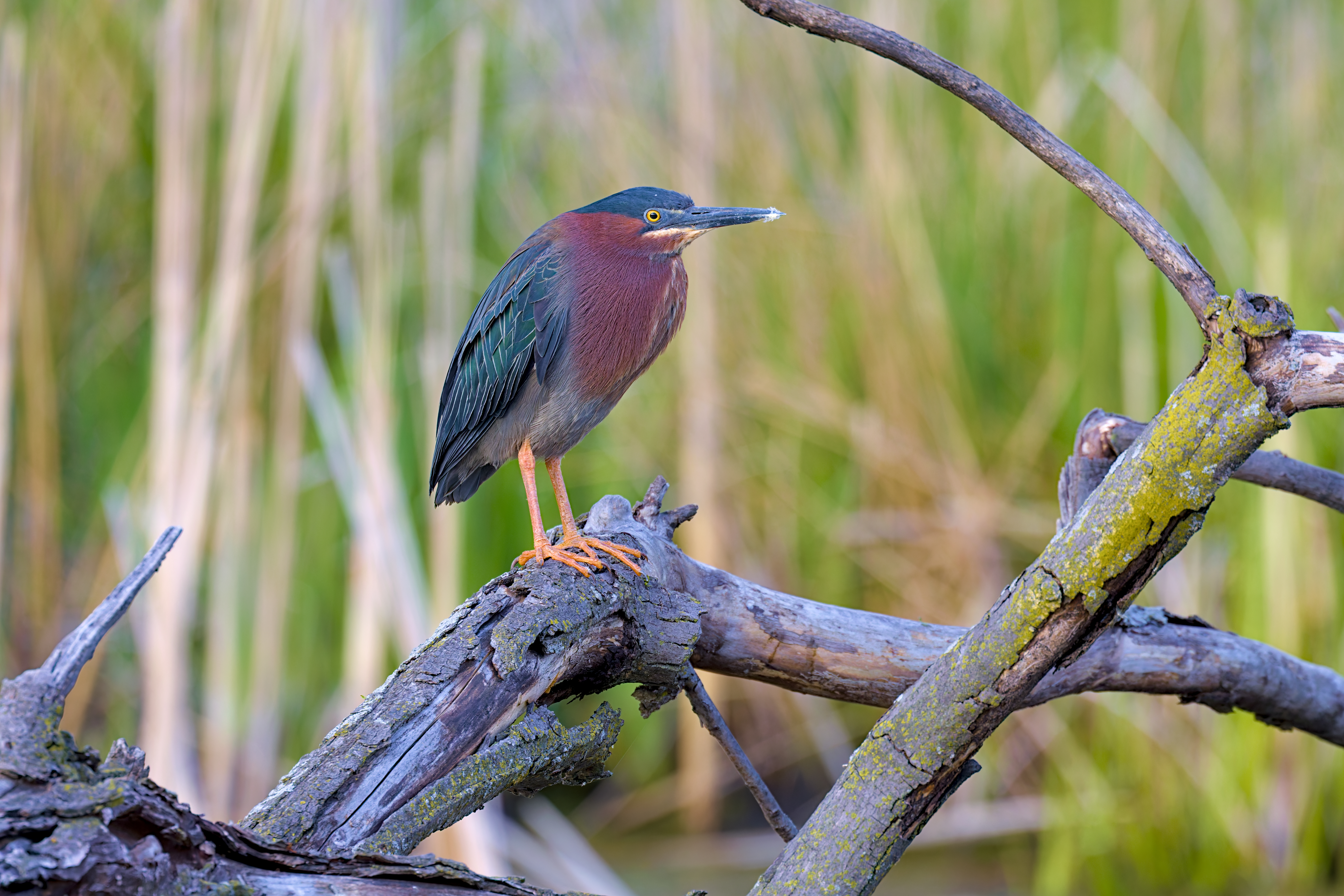
Adult in habitat, Chicago IL
