= List of Musophagiformes by population =

This is a list of Musophagiformes species by global population. While numbers are estimates, they have been made by the experts in their fields. For more information on how these estimates were ascertained, see Wikipedia's articles on population biology and population ecology. This list is not comprehensive, as not all species of this order has had their global populations estimated.

== Species by global population ==
Common name	Binomial name	Population	Status	Trend	Notes	Image
Fischer's turaco	Tauraco fischeri	1,500-7,000	NT	▼		
Bannerman's turaco	Tauraco bannermani	4,800-14,000	NT	▼		
Ruspoli's turaco	Tauraco ruspolii	2,500-9,999	NT	▼		

== See also ==
- Lists of birds by population
- Lists of organisms by population
