= List of birds by population =

This is a set of lists of bird species by global population, divided by avian order. While numbers are estimates, they have been made by the experts in their fields. For more information on how these estimates were ascertained, see Wikipedia's articles on population biology and population ecology. Contributing organizations include the IUCN, BirdLife International, and Partners in Flight.

The global population of all mature birds is estimated to be 50 – 100 billion individuals. Total species population, including immature individuals, is higher during the breeding season of each species.

These lists are incomplete, because experts have not estimated all bird populations. For example, the spectacled flowerpecker was only discovered in 2010, and did not receive its scientific name (Dicaeum dayakorum) until 2019, adding to the other 73 new bird species described by ornithologists from 2000 – 2009. Global population estimates for many of these at this time would lack accuracy.

All numbers are estimates, because they are made via bird surveys (e.g., point counting) and extrapolating species density estimates made via observation data over a species' known range. Population estimates should be interpreted with a margin of error, even when only one value is provided.

The number of species within a order corresponds to IOC guidance unless otherwise noted. IUCN/Birdlife International taxonomic classifications often differ from the IOC; for specific disagreements, see Order specific pages.

== By taxonomy ==
List by taxonomic order	Birds included	# of quantified species / # of total species (%)^{1}	Example of less common species	Example of more common species	
Accipitriformes	Hawks, eagles, kites, Old World vultures	180 / 259 (69%)	Philippine eagle (CR)	Roadside hawk (LC)	
Accipitriformes	Hawks, eagles, kites, Old World vultures	180 / 259 (69%)	Pop: 128-924	Pop: 5,000,000-50,000,000	
Aegotheliformes	Owlet-nightjars	1 / 10 (10%)			
Anseriformes	Waterfowl: ducks, geese, swans, screamers	176 / 178 (99%)	White-winged duck (CR)	Mallard (LC)	
Anseriformes	Waterfowl: ducks, geese, swans, screamers	176 / 178 (99%)	Pop: 150-450	Pop: 17,260,000-19,300,000	
Apodiformes	Swifts, hummingbirds	167 / 480 (35%)	Santa Marta sabrewing (CR)	Common swift (LC)	
Apodiformes	Swifts, hummingbirds	167 / 480 (35%)	Pop: 1-49	Pop: 80,000,000-142,000,000	
Apterygiformes	Kiwis	5 / 5 (100%)	Okarito kiwi (VU)	Southern brown kiwi (VU)	
Apterygiformes	Kiwis	5 / 5 (100%)	Pop: 350-400	Pop: 16,500	
Bucerotiformes	Hornbills, hoopoes, scimitarbills	15 / 75 (20%)	Sulu hornbill (CR)	Eurasian hoopoe (LC)	
Bucerotiformes	Hornbills, hoopoes, scimitarbills	15 / 75 (20%)	Pop: 1 - 49	Pop: 5,000,000 - 10,000,000	
Caprimulgiformes	Nightjars, nighthawks, poorwills	31 / 98 (32%)	Jamaican poorwill (CR)	Common nighthawk (LC)	
Caprimulgiformes	Nightjars, nighthawks, poorwills	31 / 98 (32%)	Pop: 1-49	Pop: 23,000,000	
Cariamiformes	Seriemas	0 / 2 (0%)			
Cathartiformes	New World vultures, condors	5 / 7 (71%)	California condor (CR)	Black vulture (LC)	
Cathartiformes	New World vultures, condors	5 / 7 (71%)	Pop: 93	Pop: 50,000,000-99,999,999	
Casuariiformes	Cassowaries, emus	3 / 4 (75%)	Northern cassowary (LC)	Emu (LC)	
Casuariiformes	Cassowaries, emus	3 / 4 (75%)	Pop: 10,000-19,999	Pop: 630,000-725,000	
Charadriiformes	Waders, gulls, terns, auks	343 / 392 (88%)^{2}	Jerdon's courser (CR)	Sooty tern (LC)	
Charadriiformes	Waders, gulls, terns, auks	343 / 392 (88%)^{2}	Pop: 1-50	Pop: 23,000,000	
Ciconiiformes	Storks	20 / 20 (100%)	Storm's stork (EN)	White stork (LC)	
Ciconiiformes	Storks	20 / 20 (100%)	Pop: 300-1,750	Pop: 526,000-588,000	
Coliiformes	Mousebirds	0 / 6 (0%)			
Columbiformes	Doves, pigeons	147 / 352 (42%)	Grenada dove (CR)	Mourning dove (LC)	
Columbiformes	Doves, pigeons	147 / 352 (42%)	Pop: 136-182	Pop: 120,000,000-140,000,000	
Coraciiformes	Kingfishers, motmots, bee-eaters	58 / 186 (31%)	Marquesan kingfisher (CR)	Ringed kingfisher (LC)	
Coraciiformes	Kingfishers, motmots, bee-eaters	58 / 186 (31%)	Pop: 350	Pop: 20,000,000	
Cuculiformes	Cuckoos	29 / 156 (19%)	Sumatran ground cuckoo (EN)	Common cuckoo (LC)	
Cuculiformes	Cuckoos	29 / 156 (19%)	Pop: 1,500-6,000	Pop: 34,600,000-54,400,000	
Eurypygiformes	Kagu, sunbittern	2 / 2 (100%)	Kagu (EN)	Sunbittern (LC)	
Eurypygiformes	Kagu, sunbittern	2 / 2 (100%)	Pop: 250 - 299	Pop: 500,000-4,999,999	
Falconiformes	Falcons and caracaras	47 / 65 (72%)	Mauritius kestrel (EN)	American kestrel (LC)	
Falconiformes	Falcons and caracaras	47 / 65 (72%)	Pop: 140 - 170	Pop: 9,200,000	
Galliformes	Landfowl: pheasants, guineafowl, quails, curassows, megapodes	153 / 307 (50%)	Edward's pheasant (CR)	Common pheasant (LC)	
Galliformes	Landfowl: pheasants, guineafowl, quails, curassows, megapodes	153 / 307 (50%)	Pop: 0-49	Pop: 75,000,000-150,000,000^{3}	
Gaviiformes	Loons	5 / 5 (100%)	Yellow-billed loon (NT)	Pacific loon (LC)	
Gaviiformes	Loons	5 / 5 (100%)	Pop: 11,000 – 21,000	Pop: 930,000 – 1,600,000	
Gruiformes	Cranes, rails, finfoots, trumpeters, limpkin	137 / 190 (72%)^{4}	Lord Howe woodhen (EN)	American coot (LC)	
Gruiformes	Cranes, rails, finfoots, trumpeters, limpkin	137 / 190 (72%)^{4}	Pop: 200-286	Pop: 7,100,000	
Leptosomiformes	Cuckoo-roller	0 / 1 (0%)			
Mesitornithiformes	Mesites	3 / 3 (100%)	White-breasted mesite (VU)	Subdesert mesite (VU)	
Mesitornithiformes	Mesites	3 / 3 (100%)	Pop: 5,300	Pop: 65,000-110,000	
Musophagiformes	Turacos	3 / 23 (13%)			
Nyctibiiformes	Potoos	3 / 7 (43%)	Northern potoo (LC)	Great potoo (LC)	
Nyctibiiformes	Potoos	3 / 7 (43%)	Pop: 50,000 - 499,999	Pop: 500,000 - 4,999,999	
Opisthocomiformes	Hoatzin	0 / 1 (0%)			
Otidiformes	Bustards, floricans, korhaans	11 / 26 (42%)	Great Indian bustard (CR)	Little bustard (NT)	
Otidiformes	Bustards, floricans, korhaans	11 / 26 (42%)	Pop: 50-249	Pop: 100,000-499,999	
Passeriformes	Passerines: New Zealand wrens, suboscines, songbirds	? / 6533	Banded cotinga (CR)	Barn swallow (LC)	
Passeriformes	Passerines: New Zealand wrens, suboscines, songbirds	? / 6533	Pop: 50-249	Pop: 290,000,000 - 487,000,000	
Pelecaniformes	Ibises, spoonbills, herons, shoebill, hamerkop, pelicans	106 / 118 (90%)	White-bellied heron (CR)	Cocoi heron (LC)	Ardea_cocoi-standing
Pelecaniformes	Ibises, spoonbills, herons, shoebill, hamerkop, pelicans	106 / 118 (90%)	Pop: 50-249	Pop: 5,000,000-49,999,999	Ardea_cocoi-standing
Phaethontiformes	Tropicbirds	3 / 3 (100%)	Red-billed tropicbird (LC)	White-tailed tropicbird (LC)	
Phaethontiformes	Tropicbirds	3 / 3 (100%)	Pop: 16,000-30,000	Pop: 400,000	
Phoenicopteriformes	Flamingos	6 / 6 (100%)	Andean flamingo (VU)	Lesser flamingo (NT)	
Phoenicopteriformes	Flamingos	6 / 6 (100%)	Pop: 38,000	Pop: 2,220,000 – 3,240,000	
Piciformes	Woodpeckers, jacamars, toucans, barbets, honeyguides	133 / 448 (30%)	Ivory-billed woodpecker (CR)	Great spotted woodpecker (LC)	
Piciformes	Woodpeckers, jacamars, toucans, barbets, honeyguides	133 / 448 (30%)	Pop: 1-49	Pop: 49,000,000-78,000,000	
Podargiformes	Frogmouths	2 / 16 (13%)			
Podicipediformes	Grebes	22 / 23 (96%)^{5}	New Zealand grebe (LC)	Black-necked grebe (LC)	
Podicipediformes	Grebes	22 / 23 (96%)^{5}	Pop: 1,000 – 5,000	Pop: 3,900,000 – 4,200,000	
Procellariiformes	Albatrosses, shearwaters, petrels	143 / 149 (96%)	New Zealand storm petrel (CR)	Antarctic prion (LC)	
Procellariiformes	Albatrosses, shearwaters, petrels	143 / 149 (96%)	Pop: 1-49	Pop: 50,000,000	
Psittaciformes	Parrots, cockatoos	185 / 406 (46%)	Orange-bellied parrot (CR)	Blue-headed parrot (LC)	
Psittaciformes	Parrots, cockatoos	185 / 406 (46%)	Pop: 20-25	Pop: 5,000,000-49,999,999	
Pterocliformes	Sandgrouse	2 / 16 (13%)			
Rheiformes	Rheas	0 / 2 (0%)			
Sphenisciformes	Penguins	18 / 19 (95%)	Galapagos penguin (EN)	Macaroni penguin (VU)	
Sphenisciformes	Penguins	18 / 19 (95%)	Pop: 1,200	Pop: 12,600,000	
Steatornithiformes	Oilbird	1 / 1 (100%)			
Strigiformes	Owls	96 / 254 (38%)	Seychelles scops owl (CR)	Ferruginous pygmy owl (LC)	
Strigiformes	Owls	96 / 254 (38%)	Pop: 200-280	Pop: 20,000,000	
Struthioniformes	Ostriches	1 / 2 (50%)	Somali ostrich (VU)	Common ostrich (LC)	
Struthioniformes	Ostriches	1 / 2 (50%)	Pop: unknown	Pop: 300,000-900,000	
Suliformes	Shags, frigatebirds, gannets, cormorants	44 / 60 (73%)	Chatham Islands shag (CR)	Neotropic cormorant (LC)	
Suliformes	Shags, frigatebirds, gannets, cormorants	44 / 60 (73%)	Pop: 710	Pop: 2,000,000	
Tinamiformes	Tinamous	17 / 46 (37%)	Black tinamou (VU)	Great tinamou (LC)	
Tinamiformes	Tinamous	17 / 46 (37%)	Pop: 1,900 – 4,400	Pop: 5,000,000 – 49,999,999	
Trogoniformes	Trogons, quetzals	14 / 43 (33%)	Javan trogon (VU)	Collared trogon (LC)	
Trogoniformes	Trogons, quetzals	14 / 43 (33%)	Pop: 2,500 – 9,999	Pop: 5,000,000 – 49,999,999	

== See also ==
- Lists of mammals by population
- Lists of organisms by population

== Notes ==
1.Denominator (Total Species in Order) from IOC List of Birds (version 15.1).
2.Number of species with population estimates includes estimates for Northern New Zealand dotterel, common white tern, and little white tern, which are considered full species by IUCN/BirdLife International, but subspecies by the IOC.
3.Values include the common pheasant's estimated population across its introduced range.
4.Number of species with population estimates includes estimates for black-winged trumpeter and Junin crake, which are considered full species by IUCN/BirdLife International, but subspecies by the IOC.
5.IOC recognizes tricolored grebe as a full species; IUCN/BirdLife International do not. The latter splits silvery grebe into two species (northern/southern silvery grebe); which the former retains as one species. This results in 23 total species regardless, and 22 species with populations quantified.
