= List of Otidiformes by population =

This is a list of Otidiformes species by global population. While numbers are estimates, they have been made by the experts in their fields. For more information on how these estimates were ascertained, see Wikipedia's articles on population biology and population ecology.

The IOC World Bird List (version 15.1) recognizes 26 species of Otidiformes. IUCN/BirdLife International have assessed all members of this order, with population estimates provided for 11 (42%) species.

This list follows IUCN classifications for species names. Where IUCN classifications differ from other ornithological authorities, alternative names are noted. While not all of these species have had their populations quantified, species without estimates are also listed below in a separate table.

== Species by global population ==
Common name	Binomial name	Population	Status	Trend	Notes	Image
Great Indian bustard	Ardeotis nigriceps	50-249	CR	▼	Total population is estimated to be less than 300 individuals.	
Bengal florican	Houbaropsis bengalensis	250-999	CR	▼	Total population is estimated to be 375-1,499 individuals.	
Lesser florican	Sypheotides indicus	356-1,228	CR	▼	Best estimate for breeding population is 730 mature individuals.	
Australian bustard	Ardeotis australis	6,700-67,000	LC	▼	Total population is estimated to be less than 100,000 individuals.	
Blue bustard (Blue korhaan)	Eupodotis caerulescens	8,000-10,000	NT	▼	Total population is estimated to be 12,000-15,000 individuals.	
African houbara	Chlamydotis undulata	11,000-30,000	VU	▼	Value provided is a rough estimate for total population.	
Kori bustard	Ardeotis kori	20,000-50,000	NT	▼	Values provided are a tentative estimate of total population.	
Great bustard	Otis tarda	29,600-33,000	EN	▼		
Asian houbara	Chlamydotis macqueenii	33,000-67,000	VU	▼	Total population is estimated to be 50,000-99,999 individuals.	
Ludwig's bustard	Neotis ludwigii	70,000-335,000	EN	▼	Total population is estimated to be 100,000-499,999 individuals.	
Little bustard	Tetrax tetrax	100,000-499,999	NT	▼	European subpopulation estimated at 122,000-240,000 mature individuals.	

== Species without population estimates ==
Common name	Binomial name	Population	Status	Trend	Notes	Image
Southern black bustard (Southern black korhaan)	Afrotis afra	unknown	VU	▼		
Nubian bustard	Neotis nubia	unknown	VU	▼		
Arabian bustard	Ardeotis arabs	unknown	NT	▼		
Little brown bustard	Heterotetrax humilis	unknown	NT	▼		
Denham's bustard	Neotis denhami	unknown	NT	▼	Southern African population is estimated to be between 2,500-10,000 mature individuals; populations across the rest of range have not been estimated well enough to provide a global estimate.	
Northern black bustard (Northern black korhaan)	Afrotis afraoides	unknown	LC	Steady		
White-bellied bustard	Eupodotis senegalensis	unknown	LC	▼		
Rüppell's bustard (Rüppell's korhaan)	Heterotetrax rueppelii	unknown	LC	Steady		
Karoo bustard (Karoo korhaan)	Heterotetrax vigorsii	unknown	LC	▲		
Hartlaub's bustard	Lissotis hartlaubii	unknown	LC	Steady		
Black-bellied bustard	Lissotis melanogaster	unknown	LC	▼		
Buff-crested bustard	Lophotis gindiana	unknown	LC	Steady		
Red-crested bustard (Red-crested korhaan)	Lophotis ruficrista	unknown	LC	Steady		
Savile's bustard	Lophotis savilei	unknown	LC	Steady		
Heuglin's bustard	Neotis heuglinii	unknown	LC	Steady		

== See also ==
- Lists of birds by population
- Lists of organisms by population
