= List of Bucerotiformes by population =

Estimated counts and status of hornbills, ground hornbills, hoopoes, and allies

This is a list of Bucerotiformes species by global population. While numbers are estimates, they have been made by the experts in their fields. For more information on how these estimates were ascertained, see Wikipedia's articles on population biology and population ecology.

This list is incomprehensive, as not all Bucerotiformes have had their numbers quantified.

The IOC World Bird List (version 15.1) recognizes 75 species of Bucerotiformes.

This list follows IUCN classifications for species names. Where IUCN classifications differ from other ornithological authorities, alternative names are noted.

Some species listed as members of Bucerotiformes are extinct:

- St. Helena hoopoe (Upupa antaios) - went extinct by end of 17th century.

== Species by global population ==
Common name	Binomial name	Population	Status	Trend	Notes	Image
Sulu hornbill	Anthracoceros montani	1 – 49	CR	▼		
Mindoro hornbill	Penelopides mindorensis	250 - 999	EN	▼		
Narcondam hornbill	Rhyticeros narcondami	300 - 650	VU	Steady		
Sumba hornbill	Rhyticeros everetti	1,000 - 2,000	EN	▼		
Rufous-headed hornbill (Walden's hornbill)	Rhabdotorrhinus waldeni	1,000 - 3,000	EN	▼	Total population is estimated to be 1,500-5,000 individuals.	
Visayan hornbill	Penelopides panini	1,200	EN	▼	Total population is estimated to be at least 1,800 individuals. Note that IOC taxonomy splits an additional species, the Samar hornbill, from this species. IUCN/BirdLife International maintain both species within P. panini.	
Plain-pouched hornbill	Rhyticeros subruficollis	2,500 - 5,000	VU	▼	Total population is estimated to be, at minimum, 4,000 individuals.	
Tickell's brown hornbill	Anorrhinus tickelli	2,500 - 9,999	NT	▼		
Rufous-necked hornbill	Aceros nipalensis	7,000 - 10,000	VU	▼	Total population is estimated to be 12,000-15,000 individuals.	
Malabar pied hornbill	Anthracoceros coronatus	7,200 - 72,000	NT	▼	Best estimate for number of mature individuals is 7,200-25,000.	
Yellow-casqued hornbill	Ceratogymna elata	8,000 - 9,000	VU	▼	Total population has been previously estimated as 12,533 individuals. This may be an underestimate, given the size of remaining suitable habitat.	
Great hornbill	Buceros bicornis	13,000 - 27,000	VU	▼	Total population is estimated (precautionary) to be 23,000 - 71,000 individuals.	
Palawan hornbill	Anthracoceros marchei	20,000 - 49,999	VU	▼		
Common hoopoe (Eurasian hoopoe)	Upupa epops	5,000,000 - 10,000,000	LC	▼	Values given are for total population.	

== See also ==
- Lists of birds by population
- Lists of organisms by population
