= List of Struthioniformes by population =

This is a list of Struthioniformes species by global population. While numbers are estimates, they have been made by the experts in their fields. For more information on how these estimates were ascertained, see Wikipedia's articles on population biology and population ecology.

The IOC World Bird List (version 15.1) recognizes 2 species of Struthioniformes. As of December 2025, IUCN/BirdLife International have assessed 1/2 (50%) members of this order.

== Species by global population ==
| Common name | Binomial name | Population | Status | Trend | Notes | Image |
|---|---|---|---|---|---|---|
| Common ostrich | Struthio camelus | 300,000-900,000 | LC | ▼ | Values are estimate for total population. | |
| Somali ostrich | Struthio molybdophanes | unknown | VU | ▼ | | |

== See also ==
- Lists of birds by population
- Lists of organisms by population
