= List of Falconiformes by population =

This is a list of Falconiformes species by global population. While members of Falconiformes were once classified with the hawks, eagles, vultures, and kites of order Accipitriformes, recent genetic analysis indicates they are not close relatives of these birds. Version 15.1 of the IOC World Bird List describes 65 species within Falconiformes, two of which are extinct. As of December 2025, BirdLife International has assessed 64 of these species (excepting rock kestrel). While not all of these species have had their populations quantified, species without estimates are also listed below in a separate table.

While numbers are estimates, they have been made by the experts in their fields. For more information on how these estimates were ascertained, see Wikipedia's articles on population biology and population ecology.

There are two species listed as members of Falconiformes which are extinct. They are as follows:

- Guadalupe caracara (Caracara lutosa) - last recorded in 1903.
- Réunion kestrel (Falco duboisi) - species is mentioned by early explorers, but went extinct sometime after 1674.

== Species by global population ==
Common name	Binomial name	Population	Status	Trend	Notes	Image
Mauritius kestrel	Falco punctatus	140-170	EN	▼		
Taita falcon	Falco fasciinucha	500-1,000	VU	▼		
Grey falcon	Falco hypoleucos	500-10,000	VU	Steady	Best estimate for population size is 1,000 mature individuals.	Grey_Falcon_(1)_-_Christopher_Watson_(cropped)
Banded kestrel	Falco zoniventris	670-6,700*	LC	▼	*Values provided are from the 2016 IUCN assessment. A more recent assessment from 2025 lists the total population as Unknown.	Falco_zoniventris_54012691
Philippine falconet	Microhierax erythrogenys	670-6,700*	LC	▼	*Values provided are from the 2016 IUCN assessment. A more recent assessment from 2025 lists the total population as Unknown.	
Pied falconet	Microhierax melanoleucos	670-6,700*	LC	▼	*Values provided are from the 2016 IUCN assessment. A more recent assessment from 2025 lists the total population as Unknown.	
White-throated caracara	Phalcoboenus albogularis	670–6,700*	LC	Steady	*The population size has not been quantified. Values provided are from 2016 IUCN assessment. A more recent assessment from 2023 lists the total population as Unknown.	
Black caracara	Daptrius ater	670-6,700*	LC	Steady	*The population size has not been quantified. Values provided are from 2016 IUCN assessment. A more recent assessment from 2023 lists the total population as Unknown.	Black_caracara_(Daptrius_ater)_Rio_Napo
Carunculated caracara	Phalcoboenus carunculatus	670-6,700*	LC	Steady	*The population size has not been quantified. Values provided are from 2016 IUCN assessment. A more recent assessment from 2023 lists the total population as Unknown.	
Black falcon	Falco subniger	670-6,700	LC	Steady		
Seychelles kestrel	Falco araeus	700-900	VU	Steady	Minimum estimate.	
Oriental hobby	Falco severus	1,000-10,000	LC	▼	The current population size is considered unknown; values provided are a preliminary estimate which is likely too low.	
Striated caracara	Phalcoboenus australis	2,500-5,000	NT	▼		
Sooty falcon	Falco concolor	2,800-4,000	VU	▼		
Plumbeous forest falcon	Micrastur plumbeus	3,600-5,000	VU	▼	Population estimation assumes species density across its range is the same as have been observed in Colombia (1 individual/km^{2}).	MicrasturPlumbeusGronvold
New Zealand falcon	Falco novaeseelandiae	5,000-15,000	LC	Steady		
Orange-breasted falcon	Falco deiroleucus	5,000-25,000	NT	▼		
Fox kestrel	Falco alopex	6,700-67,000	LC	Steady		
African hobby	Falco cuvierii	>10,000	LC	▼	IUCN does not estimate a population, but does mention a previous population estimate from 2001 – "larger than 10,000 individuals."	Falco_cuvierii_242928271
White-fronted falconet	Microhierax latifrons	10,000-19,999	NT	▼		
Laggar falcon	Falco jugger	10,000-19,999	NT	▼		
White-rumped pygmy falcon (White-rumped falcon)	Neohierax insignis	10,000-19,999*	NT	▼	*The population size has not been quantified. Values provided are from 2017 IUCN assessment. A more recent assessment from 2024 lists the total population as Unknown.	
Collared falconet	Microhierax caerulescens	10,000-99,999	LC	▼	IUCN assessment does not provide a direct estimate, but says, "population is estimated to number in the tens of thousands."	Collared_Falconet_by_Tisha_Mukherjee_03
Black-thighed falconet	Microhierax fringillarius	10,000-99,999	LC	▼	IUCN assessment does not provide a direct estimate, but says, "population is estimated to number in the tens of thousands."	Microhierax_fringillarius_112598890
Spotted kestrel	Falco moluccensis	10,000-99,999	LC	▲	IUCN assessment does not provide a direct estimate, but says, "population is estimated to number in the tens of thousands."	Spotted_kestrel_flying_(16862666012)
Saker falcon	Falco cherrug	12,200-29,800	EN	▼		
Gyrfalcon	Falco rusticolus	12,600-55,300	LC	Steady		
Eleonora's falcon	Falco eleonorae	32,400-33,300	LC	▲		
Slaty-backed forest falcon	Micrastur mirandollei	50,000-499,999	LC	▼		Micrastur_Mirandollei_(cropped)
Lanner falcon	Falco biarmicus	67,000-670,000	LC	▼		
Lesser kestrel	Falco naumanni	80,000-134,000	LC	Steady		
Peregrine falcon	Falco peregrinus	100,000-499,999	LC	▲		
Prairie falcon	Falco mexicanus	110,000	LC	▲		Falco_mexicanus_-San_Luis_Obispo,_California,_USA-8_(1)
Amur falcon	Falco amurensis	200,000-667,000	LC	Steady		
Merlin	Falco columbarius	250,000-3,200,000	LC	Steady		
Red-footed falcon	Falco vespertinus	287,500-400,000	VU	▼		
Bat falcon	Falco rufigularis	500,000-4,999,999	LC	▼		
Barred forest falcon	Micrastur ruficollis	500,000-4,999,999	LC	▼		
Collared forest falcon	Micrastur semitorquatus	500,000-4,999,999	LC	▼		
Laughing falcon	Herpetotheres cachinnans	500,000-4,999,999	LC	▼		
Red-throated caracara	Ibycter americanus	500,000-4,999,999	LC	▼		Red-throated_Caracara
Eurasian hobby	Falco subbuteo	900,000-1,500,000	LC	▼		
Cryptic forest falcon	Micrastur mintoni	1,000,000-2,499,999	NT	▼		Micrastur_mintoni_-_Cryptic_Forest_Falcon;_Parauapebas,_Pará,_Brazil
Crested caracara	Caracara plancus	2,500,000-4,999,999	LC	Steady		Schopfkarakara
Common kestrel	Falco tinnunculus	4,300,000-6,700,000	LC	▼	Note that the IUCN has not recognized the split of the Rock kestrel from this species.	
Yellow-headed caracara	Milvago chimachima	5,000,000-49,999,999	LC	▲		Gelbkopfkarakara_Milvago_chimachima
American kestrel	Falco sparverius	9,200,000	LC	▼		American_kestrel_(Falco_sparverius_cinnamominus)_male_Leona_Amarga

== Species without population estimates ==
Common name	Binomial name	Population	Status	Trend	Notes	Image
Spot-winged falconet	Spiziapteryx circumcincta	unknown	LC	Steady		Spiziapteryx_circumcincta_106906079
Chimango caracara	Daptrius chimango	unknown	LC	▲	Population is expected to be increasing due to this species' affinity for human settlements, especially feeding from garbage dumps.	Chimango_caracara_(Daptrius_chimango_temucoensis)_male_Chiloe
Mountain caracara	Daptrius megalopterus	unknown	LC	Steady		Phalcoboenus_megalopterus_in_Cordillera_Real,_Bolivia_03_1
Lined forest falcon	Micrastur gilvicollis	unknown	LC	▼		Lined_Forest_Falcon
Buckley's forest falcon	Micrastur buckleyi	unknown	LC	▼		
African pygmy-falcon (Pygmy falcon)	Polihierax semitorquatus	unknown	LC	Steady		Polihierax_semitorquatus_-Buffalo_Springs_National_Park,_Kenya-8
Malagasy kestrel	Falco newtoni	unknown	LC	▲		Madagascar_Kestrel_(Falco_newtoni)_Ambohitantely_Reserve
Nankeen kestrel	Falco cenchroides	unknown	LC	▲		Nankeen_Kestrel_(Falco_cenchroides)_(43980497412)
Greater kestrel	Falco rupicoloides	unknown	LC	Steady		Falco_rupicoloides_440542662
Dickinson's kestrel	Falco dickinsoni	unknown	LC	Steady		Falco_dickinsoni_442975948
Red-necked falcon	Falco ruficollis	unknown	LC	▼		Red-Necked_Falcon
Aplomado falcon	Falco femoralis	unknown	LC	▼		Aplomado_Falcon_portrait
Australian hobby	Falco longipennis	unknown	LC	▼		Australian_Hobby_(Falco_longipennis)_(32559893013)
Brown falcon	Falco berigora	unknown	LC	▼		Brown_Falcon_(Falco_berigora)_(14561166691)

== See also ==
- Lists of birds by population
- Lists of organisms by population
