= List of Gaviiformes by population =

This is a list of Gaviiformes species by global population. While numbers are estimates, they have been made by the experts in their fields. For more information on how these estimates were ascertained, see Wikipedia's articles on population biology and population ecology.

This list follows IUCN classifications for species names. Where IUCN classifications differ from other ornithological authorities, alternative names are noted. The IOC World Bird List (version 15.1) recognizes 5 species of Gaviiformes. IUCN/BirdLife International have assessed the populations of all members of this order.

== Species by global population ==
Common name	Binomial name	Population	Status	Trend	Notes	Image
Yellow-billed loon	Gavia adamsii	11,000-21,000	NT	▼		
Red-throated loon	Gavia stellata	200,000-600,000	LC	▼	Values provided are estimates of the total population.	
Arctic loon (Black-throated loon)	Gavia arctica	275,000-1,500,000	LC	▼	Values provided are estimates of the total population.	
Common loon	Gavia immer	612,000-640,000	LC	Steady	Values provided are estimates of the total population.	
Pacific loon	Gavia pacifica	930,000–1,600,000	LC	▲	Values provided are estimates of the total population.	

== See also ==
- Lists of birds by population
- Lists of organisms by population
