= List of Phoenicopteriformes by population =

Population estimates of Phoenicopteriformes (flamingo) species

This is a list of Phoenicopteriformes species by global population. While numbers are estimates, they have been made by the experts in their fields. For more information on how these estimates were ascertained, see Wikipedia's articles on population biology and population ecology.

This list follows IUCN guidance for species names. Where IUCN classifications differ from other ornithological authorities, alternative names are noted.

== Species by global population ==
Common name	Binomial name	Population	Status	Trend	Notes	Image
Andean flamingo	Phoenicoparrus andinus	38,000	VU	▼	Maximum estimate. The population has been steadily decreasing, and current population is unknown.	
Puna flamingo (James's flamingo)	Phoenicoparrus jamesi	95,000-110,000	NT	Steady		
American flamingo	Phoenicopterus ruber	150,000-205,000	LC	▲		
Chilean flamingo	Phoenicopterus chilensis	300,000	NT	▼	Population is based on census in 2010 which counted 283,000 individuals.	
Greater flamingo	Phoenicopterus roseus	550,000-680,000	LC	▲	Divided into three separate populations: The Palearctic, stretching from West Africa to Kazakhstan (205,000-320,000); The South West and South Asian (240,000); and the sub-Saharan African (100,000-120,000).	
Lesser flamingo	Phoeniconaias minor	2,220,000-3,240,000	NT	▼	Estimate provided is for total population.	

== See also ==
- Lists of birds by population
- Lists of organisms by population
