= List of Ciconiiformes by population =

This is a list of Ciconiiformes species by global population. While numbers are estimates, they have been made by the experts in their fields. For more information on how these estimates were ascertained, see Wikipedia's articles on population biology and population ecology.

The IOC World Bird List (version 15.1) recognizes 20 species of Ciconiiformes. As of December 2025, IUCN/BirdLife International have assessed the populations of all members of this order. This list follows IUCN classifications for species names. Where IUCN classifications differ from other ornithological authorities, alternative names are noted.

== Species by global population ==
| Common name | Binomial name | Population | Status | Trend | Notes | Image |
|---|---|---|---|---|---|---|
| Storm's stork | Ciconia stormi | 300-1,750 | EN | ▼ | | |
| Milky stork | Mycteria cinerea | 600-1,850 | EN | ▼ | Best estimate of breeding population is 1,200-1,850 mature individuals. | |
| Oriental stork | Ciconia boyciana | 1,000-2,499 | EN | ▼ | Estimate for mature individuals. | |
| Greater adjutant | Leptoptilos dubius | 1,360-1,510 | NT | ▲ | Total population is estimated to be 3,180-3,300 individuals. | |
| Lesser adjutant | Leptoptilos javanicus | 5,000-15,000 | NT | ? | | |
| Saddle-billed stork | Ephippiorhynchus senegalensis | 5,200-15,000 | NT | ▼ | | |
| Black-necked stork | Ephippiorhynchus asiaticus | 10,000-30,000 | LC | ▼ | Almost certainly an underestimate, but values provided are cautionary 'best guesses' for total population. | |
| African woollyneck (African woolly-necked stork) | Ciconia microscelis | 20,000-53,000 | LC | ▲ | Total population is estimated to be 30,000-80,000 individuals. | |
| Painted stork | Mycteria leucocephala | 20,000-60,000 | LC | ▲ | | |
| Jabiru | Jabiru mycteria | 20,000-85,000 | LC | ? | Estimate for mature individuals. Another estimate has been made that places the population at fewer than 50,000 mature individuals. | |
| Black stork | Ciconia nigra | 21,400-42,100 | LC | ? | Total population is estimated to be 32,110-63,100 individuals. | |
| Maguari stork | Ciconia maguari | 33,300-66,700 | LC | Steady | Total population is estimated to be 50,000-100,000 individuals. | |
| Yellow-billed stork | Mycteria ibis | 50,000-100,000 | LC | ▼ | Total population is estimated to be 75,000-150,000 individuals. | |
| Asian woollyneck (Asian woolly-necked stork) | Ciconia episcopus | 50,000-249,999 | NT | ▼ | Total population in South Asia alone is estimated to be 120,000-310,000 individuals. | |
| Wood stork | Mycteria americana | 144,000-756,000 | LC | ? | Total population is estimated to be 216,600-1,133,900 individuals. | |
| Abdim's stork | Ciconia abdimii | 200,000-400,000 | LC | ▼ | Total population is estimated to be 300,000-600,000 individuals. | |
| Marabou stork | Leptoptilos crumenifer | 200,000-500,000 | LC | ▼ | Values given are an estimate of total population. | |
| Asian openbill | Anastomus oscitans | 300,000 | LC | ▲ | Current population size is likely larger than reported value. The estimate "dates from 2006 and does not account for the species' great range expansion since." | |
| African openbill | Anastomus lamelligerus | 300,000-500,000 | LC | Steady | Values given are for total population. | |
| White stork | Ciconia ciconia | 526,000-588,000 | LC | ▲ | European subpopulation estimated at 502,000-563,000 mature individuals. | |

== See also ==
- Lists of birds by population
- Lists of organisms by population
