= List of Caprimulgiformes by population =

This is a list of Caprimulgiformes species by global population. While numbers are estimates, they have been made by the experts in their fields. For more information on how these estimates were ascertained, see Wikipedia's articles on population biology and population ecology.

This list is not comprehensive, as not all Caprimulgiformes have had their numbers quantified.

The IOC World Bird List (version 15.1) recognizes 98 species of Caprimulgiformes. This list follows IUCN classifications for species names. Where IUCN classifications differ from other ornithological authorities, alternative names are noted.

== Species by global population ==
Common name	Binomial name	Population	Status	Trend	Notes	Image
New Caledonian nightjar	Eurostopodus exul	0-49	CR	?	May be extinct. Species is known from a single individual, taken in 1939.	
Jamaican poorwill	Siphonorhis americana	1-49	CR	?	May be extinct. No records since 1860.	
White-winged nightjar	Eleothreptus candicans	600-1,700	VU	▼	Total population is estimated to be 1,000-2,499 individuals, but population may be larger, depending on species density in unsurveyed areas of Brazil.	
Solomons nightjar	Eurostopodus nigripennis	800-2,499	VU	▼		
Palau nightjar	Caprimulgus phalaena	1,000-2,499	LC	Steady	Preliminary estimate.	
Sickle-winged nightjar	Eleothreptus anomalus	2,500-52,000	VU	▼	Values are for total population. Large population variation is due to the common observation, but apparent scarcity of the species.	
Puerto Rican nightjar	Caprimulgus noctitherus	2,700-9,900	VU	▼	Total population is estimated to be 4,100-14,900 individuals.	
Least poorwill	Siphonorhis brewsteri	4,140	NT	▼	Total population is estimated to be 6,210 individuals.	
Bonaparte's nightjar	Caprimulgus concretus	10,000-19,999	VU	▼	Preliminary estimate.	
Choco poorwill	Nyctiphrynus rosenbergi	10,000-19,999	LC	▼	Preliminary estimate.	
Eared poorwill	Nyctiphrynus mcleodii	20,000-49,999	LC	▼		
Yucatan poorwill	Nyctiphrynus yucatanicus	20,000-49,999	LC	▼		
Dusky nightjar	Antrostomus saturatus	20,000-49,999	LC	Steady		
Short-tailed nighthawk	Lurocalis semitorquatus	50,000-499,999	LC	▼		
Spot-tailed nightjar	Caprimulgus maculicaudus	50,000-499,999	LC	Steady		
Yucatan nightjar	Caprimulgus badius	50,000-499,999	LC	▼		
Tawny-collared nightjar	Antrostomus salvini	50,000-499,999	LC	▼		
Antillean nighthawk	Chordeiles gundlachii	200,000	LC	Steady		
Mexican whip-poor-will	Antrostomus arizonae	320,000	LC	▼		
White-tailed nightjar	Hydropsalis cayennensis	500,000-4,999,999	LC	▼		
Ocellated poorwill	Nyctiphrynus ocellatus	500,000-4,999,999	LC	▼		
Red-necked nightjar	Caprimulgus ruficollis	575,000-770,000	NT	▼	Consists of two subspecies, so these estimates are very preliminary.	
Common poorwill	Phalaenoptilus nuttallii	1,700,000	LC	Steady		
Eastern whip-poor-will	Antrostomus vociferus	1,800,000	NT	Steady		
Buff-collared nightjar	Antrostomus ridgwayi	2,000,000	LC	▼		
Lesser nighthawk	Chordeiles acutipennis	2,400,000-5,500,000	LC	▼		
European nightjar	Caprimulgus europaeus	2,980,000-5,550,000	LC	?	European population estimated at 11,190,000-2,220,000 mature individuals; estimate is an extrapolation of these values.	
Rufous nightjar	Antrostomus rufus	5,000,000-49,999,999	LC	▼		
Chuck-will's-widow	Antrostomus carolinensis	5,700,000	NT	▼		
Pauraque	Nyctidromus albicollis	20,000,000	LC	Steady		
Common nighthawk	Chordeiles minor	23,000,000	LC	▼		

== Species without population estimates ==
Common name	Binomial name	Population	Status	Trend	Notes	Image
Prigogine's nightjar	Caprimulgus prigoginei	unknown	DD	?	No confirmed records since last recorded specimen was in 1955.	
Salvadori's nightjar	Caprimulgus pulchellus	unknown	LC	▼		
Heinrich's nightjar (Satanic nightjar)	Eurostopodus diabolicus	unknown	LC	▼	No empirical population data, but given large range, population is unlikely to be small.	

== See also ==
- Lists of birds by population
- Lists of organisms by population
