= List of Pelecaniformes by population =

This is a list of Pelecaniformes species by global population. While numbers are estimates, they have been made by the experts in their fields. For more information on how these estimates were ascertained, see Wikipedia's articles on population biology and population ecology.

The IOC World Bird List (version 15.1) recognizes 118 species of Pelecaniformes, seven of which are extinct. As of December 2025, IUCN/BirdLife International have assessed 111 of these species (excepting dimorphic egret, splits from striated heron, the split of cattle egret, and the extinct Ascension night heron). This list follows IUCN classifications for species names and taxonomy. Where IUCN classifications differ from other ornithological authorities, alternative names/taxonomic statuses are noted.

Several species listed as members of Pelecaniformes are extinct:

- Réunion ibis (Threskiornis solitarius) - last seen in 1763.
- New Zealand bittern (Botaurus novaezealandiae) - last seen in 1890. IUCN/BirdLife International place this bird in genus Ixobrychus.
- Bermuda night heron (Nyctanassa carcinocatactes) - last seen in 1610. Likely extinct shortly afterward.
- Ascension night heron (Nycticorax olsoni) - likely went extinct circa 1500. Not listed by IUCN/BirdLife International.
- Réunion night heron (Nycticorax duboisi) - likely went extinct in early 1700s.
- Mauritius night heron (Nycticorax mauritianus) - likely went extinct in early 1700s.
- Rodrigues night heron (Nycticorax megacephalus) - likely extinct circa 1761.

== Species by global population ==
Common name	Binomial name	Population	Status	Trend	Notes	Image
White-bellied heron	Ardea insignis	50-249	CR	▼	Total population is estimated to be 70-400 individuals.	
Dwarf ibis (São Tomé ibis)	Bostrychia bocagei	130-1,700	CR	▼	Estimate calculated from density and area estimates. Total population estimated to be 190-2,500 individuals.	
Giant ibis	Thaumatibis gigantea	194	CR	▼	Minimum estimate. Total population estimated to be 290 individuals.	
Northern bald ibis	Geronticus eremita	200-249	EN	Steady	Estimate for mature individuals only. Species is considered regionally extinct in Europe.	
Asian crested ibis (Crested ibis)	Nipponia nippon	330	EN	▲	Total population estimated to be 550 individuals.	
White-shouldered ibis	Pseudibis davisoni	670	CR	▼	Minimum estimate. Estimate for total population is 1,000 individuals.	
Malagasy pond heron	Ardeola idae	1,000-2,499	EN	▼	Estimate is for mature individuals only.	
Australasian bittern	Botaurus poiciloptilus	1,000-2,499	VU	▼		
Madagascar heron (Humblot's heron)	Ardea humbloti	1,290-1,500	EN	▼	Estimate is for mature individuals only.	
Malayan night heron	Gorsachius melanolophus	1,300-13,000	LC	?	Population on most recent IUCN assessment (2025) Is unknown. Values retained from 2016 assessment.	
Forest bittern	Zonerodius heliosylus	1,500-7,000	NT	▼	Total population is estimated to be 2,500-9,999 individuals.	
White-eared night heron	Oroanassa magnifica	1,500-15,000	NT	▼		
Malagasy sacred ibis	Threskiornis bernieri	1,733-2,166	EN	▼	Total population is estimated to be 2,600-3,250 individuals.	
Slaty egret	Egretta vinaceigula	2,500-3,000	VU	▼	Total population is estimated to be 3,000-5,000 individuals.	
Madagascar crested ibis (Madagascar ibis)	Lophotibis cristata	2,500-9,999	VU	▼	Total population is estimated to be <10,000 individuals.	
Andean ibis	Theristicus branickii	2,500-9,999	NT	▼	Total population is estimate to be 4,250-13,400 individuals.	
Schrenck's bittern (Von Schrenk's bittern)	Botaurus eurhythmus	2,500-25,000	NT	▼	Total population estimated to be 1,000-50,000 individuals. IUCN/BirdLife International still place this bird in genus Ixobrychus.	
Black-faced spoonbill	Platalea minor	3,000-5,100	VU	Steady	Total population estimated to be 6,500-7,500 individuals.	
Shoebill	Balaeniceps rex	3,300-5,300	VU	▼	Total population estimated to be 5,000-8,000 individuals.	
Chinese egret	Egretta eulophotes	4,000-6,000	VU	▼	Estimate is for mature individuals only.	
Japanese night heron	Gorsachius goisagi	5,000-9,999	VU	▼	Total population is estimated to be 7,500-15,000 individuals.	
Reddish egret	Egretta rufescens	5,000-9,999	NT	▼	Estimate for mature individuals only.	
Puna ibis	Plegadis ridgwayi	5,000-20,000	LC	Steady	Population estimate is highly uncertain.	
Yellow-billed spoonbill	Platalea flavipes	6,600-16,600	LC	Steady	Total population is estimated to be 10,000-25,000 individuals.	
White-necked heron	Ardea pacifica	6,700-16,700	LC	Steady	Total population is estimated to be 10,000-25,000 individuals.	
White-faced heron	Egretta novaehollandiae	6,700-66,700	LC	?	Total population is estimated to be 9,999-99,999 individuals.	
Rufous-bellied heron	Ardeola rufiventris	6,700-66,700	LC	▲	Total population is estimated to be 10,000-100,000 individuals.	
Goliath heron	Ardea goliath	6,700-66,700	LC	Steady	Total population is estimated to be 10,070-100,070 individuals.	
Southern bald ibis	Geronticus calvus	7,000-8,000	NT	Steady	Estimate is for mature individuals only.	
Spot-billed pelican	Pelecanus philippensis	8,700-12,000	NT	▼	Total population is estimated to be 13,000-18,000 individuals.	
Australian little bittern (Black-backed bittern)	Botaurus dubius	<10,000	LC	▼	Value given is a tentative guess for number of mature individuals. IUCN/BirdLife International still places species in Ixobrychus.	
Agami heron	Agamia agami	10,000-25,000	NT	▼	Values given are a shaky estimate of number of mature individuals.	
Wattled ibis	Bostrychia carunculata	10,000-25,000	LC	?		
Sharp-tailed ibis	Cercibis oxycerca	10,000-25,000	LC	?	Values given are for total population. This estimate is now considered outdated.	
Dalmatian pelican	Pelecanus crispus	11,400-13,400	NT	▼	Estimate is for mature individuals only.	
Great-billed heron	Ardea sumatrana	11,700-71,700	LC	▼	Total population is estimated to be 17,500-107,500 individuals.	
Olive ibis	Bostrychia olivacea	15,000-45,000	LC	▼	Total population is estimated to be <45,000 individuals.	
Pied heron	Egretta picata	16,700-66,700	LC	?	Total population is estimated to be 25,000-100,000 individuals.	
Black-faced ibis	Theristicus melanopis	16,700-66,700	LC	Steady	Total population is estimated to be 25,000-100,000 individuals.	
Dwarf bittern	Botaurus sturmii	16,700-66,700	LC	?	Total population is estimated to be 25,000-100,000 individuals. IUCN/BirdLife International still place this bird in genus Ixobrychus.	
Black heron	Egretta ardesiaca	16,700-66,700	LC	▲	Total population is estimated to be 25,000-100,000 individuals.	
Yellow-billed egret	Ardea brachyrhyncha	16,700-66,700	LC	▲	Total population is estimated to be 25,000-100,000 individuals.	
Chinese pond heron	Ardeola bacchus	16,700-667,000	LC	Steady	Total population is estimated to be 25,000-1,000,000 individuals.	
Rufescent tiger-heron	Tigrisoma lineatum	18,000-70,000	LC	Steady	Total population is estimated to be 27,700-105,500 individuals. Note: the banner population and population description sections of the cited IUCN assessment disagree. Provided values were chosen to be reported based on agreement between mature and total individual estimates.	
Fasciated tiger-heron	Tigrisoma fasciatum	20,000-49,999	LC	▼	Tentative estimate, which is higher than the Wetlands International estimate for total population (c.14,500-17,000 individuals).	
African spoonbill	Platalea alba	20,700-46,700	LC	▼	Total population is estimated to be 31,000-70,000 individuals.	
Whistling heron	Syrigma sibilatrix	23,300-73,300	LC	Steady	Total population is estimated to be 35,000-110,000 individuals.	
Nankeen night heron	Nycticorax caledonicus	24,700-743,000	LC	Steady	Total population is estimated to be 37,000-1,113,999 individuals.	
White-backed night heron	Calherodius leuconotus	25,000-100,000	LC	▼	Values given are for total population.	
White-crested tiger-heron	Tigriornis leucolopha	25,000-100,000	LC	▼	Values given are for total population.	
Royal spoonbill	Platalea regia	25,000-100,000	LC	Steady	Values given are for total population. May be an underestimate.	
Black bittern	Botaurus flavicollis	30,000-214,000	LC	?	Total population is estimated to be 45,002-320,499 individuals. IUCN/BirdLife International still place this bird in genus Ixobrychus.	
Pink-backed pelican	Pelecanus rufescens	33,300-66,700	LC	Steady	Total population is estimated to be 50,000-100,000 individuals.	
Plumbeous ibis	Theristicus caerulescens	33,300-66,700	LC	Steady	Total population is estimated to be 50,000-100,000 individuals.	
Buff-necked ibis	Theristicus caudatus	33,300-133,000	LC	Steady	Total population is estimate to be 50,000-200,000 individuals.	
Western reef-egret (Western reef heron)	Egretta gularis	36,000-92,700	LC	Steady	Total population is estimated to be 54,000-139,000 individuals. Note that IOC taxonomy splits one additional species, the dimorphic egret, from this species. IUCN/BirdLife International maintain both species under E. gularis.	
Australian pelican	Pelecanus conspicillatus	46,700-200,000	LC	Steady	Total population is estimated to be 70,000-300,000 individuals.	
Hadada ibis	Bostrychia hagedash	46,700-267,000	LC	?	Total population is estimated to be 70,000-400,000 individuals.	
Capped heron	Pilherodius pileatus	50,000-499,999	LC	▼	Values given are for total population.	
Bare-throated tiger-heron	Tigrisoma mexicanum	50,000-499,999	LC	▼	Estimate is for mature individuals only.	
Pinnated bittern	Botaurus pinnatus	50,000-499,999	LC	Steady	Estimate is for mature individuals only.	
Green ibis	Mesembrinibis cayennensis	50,000-499,999	LC	Steady	Estimate is for mature individuals only.	
Eurasian spoonbill	Platelea leucorodia	52,800-63,900	LC	▲	Total population is estimated to be 79,250-95,850 individuals.	
Scarlet ibis	Eudocimus ruber	66,700-100,000	LC	▼	Total population is estimated to be 100,000-150,000 individuals.	
Black-headed heron	Ardea melanocephala	66,700-333,000	LC	▼	Total population is estimated to be 100,000-500,000 individuals.	
Indian pond heron	Ardeola grayii	66,700-667,000	LC	?	Total population is estimated to be 99,998-999,998 individuals.	
Plumed egret	Ardea plumifera	66,700-667,000	LC	?	Total population is estimated to be 100,000-1,000,000 individuals.	
Yellow bittern	Botaurus sinensis	66,700-667,000	LC	?	Total population is estimated to be 100,000-1,000,299 individuals. IUCN/BirdLife International still place this bird in genus Ixobrychus.	
Roseate spoonbill	Platalea ajaja	68,500-171,000	LC	Steady	Total population is estimated to be 102,800-256,800 individuals.	
Stripe-backed bittern	Botaurus involucris	73,300-683,000	LC	Steady	Total population is estimated to be 110,000-1,025,000 individuals. IUCN/BirdLife International still place this bird in genus Ixobrychus.	
Bare-faced ibis	Phimosus infuscatus	83,300-733,000	LC	Steady	Total population is estimated to be 124,999-1,099,999 individuals.	
Cinnamon bittern	Botaurus cinnamomeus	83,300-1,330,000	LC	?	Total population is estimated to be 125,000-2,000,000 individuals. IUCN/BirdLife International still place this bird in genus Ixobrychus.	
Least bittern	Botaurus exilis	93,300-106,000	LC	▲	Total population is estimated to be 139,999-158,999 individuals. IUCN/BirdLife International still place this bird in genus Ixobrychus.	
American white pelican	Pelecanus erythrorhynchos	100,000-499,999	LC	▲	Best estimate for number of mature individuals is 450,000.	
Straw-necked ibis	Threskiornis spinicollis	100,000-1,000,000	LC	▼	Values given are for total population.	
Peruvian pelican	Pelecanus thagus	100,000-1,000,000	NT	▲	Values given are for total population.	
Pacific reef-egret (Pacific reef heron)	Egretta sacra	100,000-1,000,000	LC	Steady	Values given are for total population.	
Hamerkop	Scopus umbretta	113,000-743,000	LC	?	Total population is estimated to be 170,000-1,115,000 individuals.	
Glossy ibis	Plegadis falcinellus	119,000-860,000	LC	Steady	Total population is estimated to be 178,500-1,289,499 individuals.	
Green-backed heron (Striated heron)	Butorides striata	173,000-1,500,000	LC	Steady	Total population is estimated to be 260,000-2,300,000 individuals. Note that IOC taxonomy splits three additional species, green heron, little heron, and lava heron, from this species. IUCN/BirdLife International maintain all four species under B. striata.	
Purple heron	Ardea purpurea	180,000-380,000	LC	▼	Total population is estimated to be 270,000-570,000 individuals.	
Eurasian bittern	Botaurus stellaris	184,000-310,000	LC	Steady	Total population is estimated to be 275,699-465,199 individuals.	
African sacred ibis	Threskiornis aethiopicus	200,000-450,000	LC	Steady	Estimate is for mature individuals only.	
Spot-breasted ibis	Bostrychia rara	200,000-510,000	LC	▼	Values given are for total population.	
Tricolored heron	Egretta tricolor	206,000-219,000	LC	▼	Total population is estimated to be 308,350-328,699 individuals.	
White ibis (American white ibis)	Eudocimus albus	210,000-360,000	LC	Steady	Estimate is for mature individuals only.	
Black-headed ibis	Threskiornis melanocephalus	250,000-500,000	LC	▲	Total population is estimated to be 400,000-600,000.	
Great white pelican	Pelecanus onocrotalus	265,000-295,000	LC	?	Values given are for total population.	
Little blue heron	Egretta caerulea	275,000-392,000	LC	▼	Total population is estimated to be 413,001-587,400 individuals.	
Brown pelican	Pelecanus occidentalis	300,000	LC	▲	Values given are for total population.	
Squacco heron	Ardeola ralloides	370,000-780,000	LC	Steady	Values given are for total population. European subpopulation estimated at 30,000-51,700 mature individuals.	
Yellow-crowned night heron	Nyctanassa violacea	400,000	LC	Steady	IUCN/BirdLife International do not provide a population estimate. Reported value comes from Partners in Flight database.	
Little egret	Egretta garzetta	430,000-2,100,000	LC	Steady	Estimate is for mature individuals only.	
Black-crowned night heron	Nycticorax nycticorax	440,000-1,990,000	LC	?	Total population is estimated to be 663,000-2,985,000 individuals.	
Snowy egret	Egretta thula	476,000-1,620,000	LC	▲	Total population is estimated to be 713,800-2,428,000 individuals.	
Grey heron	Ardea cinerea	500,000-2,500,000	LC	?	Total population is estimated to be 790,000-3,700,000 individuals.	
Great blue heron	Ardea herodias	500,000-4,999,999	LC	▲	Estimate is for mature individuals only.	
Boat-billed heron	Cochlearius cochlearius	500,000-4,999,999	LC	▼	Values given are for total population.	
Common little bittern (Little bittern)	Botaurus minutus	600,000-1,199,999	LC	▼	IUCN/BirdLife International still place this bird in genus Ixobrychus. Very preliminary estimate is for mature individuals only.	
White-faced ibis	Plegadis chihi	1,000,000-9,999,999	LC	▲	Best estimate for number of mature individuals is 7.2 million.	
Great white egret (Great egret)	Ardea alba	1,100,000-1,600,000	LC	Steady	Total population is estimated to be 1.6-2.4 million individuals.	
American bittern	Botaurus lentiginosus	1,500,000-2,500,000	LC	▼	Total population is estimated to be 3.0 million individuals.	
Cattle egret	Bubulcus ibis	2,600,000-12,600,000	LC	Steady	Note than IOC taxonomy splits this species into two species, Eastern and Western cattle egret, both placed in the Ardea genus. IUCN/BirdLife International maintain both species under Bubulcus ibis.	
Cocoi heron	Ardea cocoi	5,000,000-49,999,999	LC	Steady	Estimate is for mature individuals only.	

== Species without population estimates ==
Common name	Binomial name	Population	Status	Trend	Notes	Image
Intermediate egret (Medium egret)	Ardea intermedia	unknown	LC	▼		
Javan pond heron	Adeola speciosa	unknown	LC	?		
Red-naped ibis	Pseudibis papillosa	unknown	LC	?		
Australian ibis (Australian white ibis)	Threskiornis molucca	unknown	LC	Steady	IUCN/BirdLife International give binomial name as T. moluccus.	
Zigzag heron	Zebrilus undulatus	unknown	LC	▼		

== See also ==
- Lists of birds by population
- Lists of organisms by population
