= List of Procellariiformes by population =

This is a list of Procellariiformes species by global population. While numbers are estimates, they have been made by the experts in their fields. For more information on how these estimates were ascertained, see Wikipedia's articles on population biology and population ecology.

The IOC World Bird List (version 15.1) recognizes 149 species of Procellariiformes, two of which are extinct. As of January 2026, IUCN/BirdLife International have assessed 144 members, and provided population estimates for 143 members of the order. While not all Procellariiformes have population estimates, species with unknown populations are listed in a secondary table below.

This list follows IUCN classifications for species names and taxonomy. Where IUCN classifications differ from other ornithological authorities, alternative names and taxonomies are noted.

Two members of Procellariiformes are extinct:

- St. Helena petrel, or large St. Helena petrel (Pterodroma rupinarum) - last seen in 1502.
- Olson's petrel, or small St. Helena petrel (Bulweria bifax) - last seen in 1502.

== Species by global population ==
Common name	Binomial name	Population	Status	Trend	Notes	Image
Fiji petrel	Pseudobulweria macgillivrayi	1-49	CR	▼	Maximum estimate.	
Guadalupe storm petrel	Hydrobates macrodactylus	1-49	CR	?	Maximum estimate; may be extinct.	
Jamaican petrel	Pterodroma caribbaea	1-49	CR	?	Maximum estimate; may be extinct. Last confirmed observation in 1879.	
New Zealand storm petrel	Fregetta maoriana	1-49	CR	?	Still seen in small numbers, as recently as 2013.	
Rapa shearwater	Puffinus myrtae	50-249	CR	▼	Total population is estimated to be 75-375 individuals.	
Bryan's shearwater	Puffinus bryani	50-249	CR	▼	Total population is estimated to be 70-380 individuals.	
Beck's petrel	Pseudobulweria becki	50-249	CR	▼	Rediscovered in 2007. Total population is estimated to be 70-400 individuals.	
Magenta petrel	Pterodroma magentae	80-100	CR	▲	Total population is estimated to be 150-200 individuals.	
Amsterdam albatross	Diomedea amsterdamensis	92	CR	▲	46 total nesting pairs.	
Mascarene petrel	Pseudobulweria aterrima	100-200	CR	▼	Population is most likely near the lower end of this estimate.	
Zino's petrel	Pterodroma madeira	160	EN	Steady	Total population is estimated to be 200 individuals.	
Bermuda petrel	Pterodroma cahow	196	EN	▲	98 total nesting pairs.	
Whenua Hou diving-petrel	Pelecanoides whenuahouensis	200	CR	▲	Value given is estimated total number of adults.	
New Caledonian storm petrel	Fregetta lineata	200-2,000	DD	?	Species is very poorly known. Values are a best guess.	
Townsend's shearwater	Puffinus auricularis	250-999	CR	▼	Total population is estimated to be 375-1,499 individuals.	
Heinroth's shearwater	Puffinus heinrothi	250-999	VU	Steady	Total population is estimated to be 375-1,499 individuals.	
Monteiro's storm petrel	Hydrobates monteiroi	250-999	VU	Steady	Total population is estimated to be 375-1,499 individuals.	
Desertas petrel	Pterodroma deserta	250-999	VU	Steady	Total population is estimated to be 350-1,500 individuals.	
Collared petrel	Pterodroma brevipes	670-6,700	VU	▼	Total population is estimated to be 1,000-10,000 individuals.	
Polynesian storm petrel	Nesofregetta fuliginosa	1,000-1,600	EN	▼	Total population is estimated to be 1,500-2,400 individuals.	
Cape Verde petrel (Fea's petrel)	Pterodroma feae	1,000-2,000	NT	?	Total population is estimated to be 1,500-3,000 individuals.	
Black-capped petrel	Pterodroma hasitata	1,000-2,000	EN	▼	Total population is estimated to be 2,000-4,000 individuals.	
Chatham Islands petrel	Pterodroma axillaris	1,100	VU	▲	Total population is estimated to be 1,400 individuals.	
Short-tailed albatross	Phoebastria albatrus	1,734	VU	▲	Total population is estimated to be 4,200 individuals.	
Pincoya storm petrel	Oceanites pincoyae	2,000	DD	?	Total population is estimated to be 3,000 individuals.	
Trindade petrel	Pterodroma arminjoniana	2,260	VU	Steady		
White-winged petrel (Gould's petrel)	Pterodroma leucoptera	2,000-14,000	VU	▼	Total population is estimated to be 3,000-21,000 individuals.	
Townsend's storm petrel	Hydrobates socorroensis	2,500-9,999	EN	▼		
Ainley's storm petrel	Hydrobates cheimomnestes	2,500-9,999	VU	Steady		
Jouanin's petrel	Bulweria fallax	2,500-9,999	NT	?		
Tristan albatross	Diomedea dabbenena	3,400-4,800	CR	▼	Total population is estimated to be 5,200-7,300 individuals.	
Ashy storm petrel	Hydrobates homochroa	3,500-6,700	EN	▼	Total population is estimated to be 5,200-10,000 individuals.	
Black petrel	Procellaria parkinsoni	5,500	VU	Steady	Total population is estimated to be and 11,000 individuals.	
Masatierra petrel	Pterodroma defilippiana	5,554	VU	Steady	Total population is expected to be less than 10,000 individuals.	
Galápagos petrel	Pterodroma phaeopygia	6,000-15,000	CR	▼	Total population is estimated to be 10,000-19,999 individuals.	
Magellanic diving petrel	Pelecanoides magellani	6,700-330,000	LC	▼	Total population is estimated to "number tens of thousands to hundreds of thousands of individuals."	
Hawaiian petrel	Pterodroma sandwichensis	7,500-16,600	EN	▼		
Westland petrel	Procellaria westlandica	7,900-13,700	EN	?		
Newell's shearwater	Puffinus newelli	10,000-19,999	CR	▼	Total population is estimated to be, at maximum, 27,000 individuals.	
Tahiti petrel	Pseudobulweria rostrata	10,000-19,999	NT	▼	Total population is estimated to be 20,000-30,000 individuals.	
Persian shearwater	Puffinus persicus	>10,000	LC	▼		
Chatham albatross	Thalassarche eremita	11,000	VU	Steady	Total population is estimated to be 16,000 individuals.	
Pycroft's petrel	Pterodroma pycrofti	12,000-22,000	VU	▲	Total population is estimated to be 30,000-40,000 individuals.	
Cape Verde shearwater	Calonectris edwardsii	13,800	NT	▼	Total population is estimated to be 24,000 individuals.	
Cape Verde storm petrel	Hydrobates jabejabe	15,500-67,500	LC	▼		
Northern royal albatross	Diomedea sanfordi	17,000	EN	▼	Total population is estimated to be 25,000-26,000 individuals.	
Balearic shearwater	Puffinus mauretanicus	19,000	CR	▼	Total population is estimated to be 25,000 individuals.	
Spectacled petrel	Procellaria conspicillata	20,000	VU	▲	Total population is estimated to be 31,000-45,000 individuals.	
Tristram's storm petrel	Hydrobates tristrami	20,000	LC	Steady	Maximum estimate. Total population is estimated to be 30,000 individuals.	
Phoenix petrel	Pterodroma alba	20,000-30,000	VU	▼	Preliminary estimate.	
Matsudaira's storm petrel	Hydrobates matsudairae	>20,000	VU	?	Per BirdLife International, species is described as "not especially rare in the Indian Ocean, suggesting that the global population numbers a minimum of 20,000 individuals".	
Snowy albatross (Wandering albatross)	Diomedea exulans	20,100	VU	▼		
Sooty albatross	Phoebetria fusca	21,234-28,656	EN	▼	Estimate comes from a count of 10,617 - 14,328 breeding pairs.	
Northern giant petrel	Macronectes halli	23,600	LC	▲		
Southern royal albatross	Diomedea epomophora	27,200	VU	Steady		
Shy albatross	Thalassarche cauta	29,800-33,400	NT	Steady	Best estimate for number of mature individuals is 31,600.	
Barau's petrel	Pterodroma baraui	30,000-40,000	EN	▼		
Audubon's shearwater (Sargasso shearwater)	Puffinus lherminieri	30,000-59,000	LC	▼	Note that IOC taxonomy splits an additional species, Boyd's shearwater, from this species (IOC splits from Barolo shearwater, which is maintained by IUCN as a subsepcies of little shearwater). IUCN/BirdLife International maintain both species within P. lherminieri.	
White-vented storm petrel (Elliot's storm petrel)	Oceanites gracilis	>30,000	DD	?	Values given are for total population.	
Yelkouan shearwater	Puffinus yelkouan	30,674-60,038	VU	▼	Estimate comes from a reported 15,337-30,519 pairs; estimated total population is 46,000-92,000 individuals. However, this may be an underestimate given counts of 75,000-90,000 individuals during migration through the Bosporus Strait as recently as 2015.	
Waved albatross	Phoebastria irrorata	34,694	CR	▼	Value given is the most recent estimate for total population, from 2001. It is likely the population is now smaller.	
Galápagos shearwater	Puffinus subalaris	35,000	LC	▼		
Atlantic yellow-nosed albatross	Thalassarche chlororhynchos	35,000-73,500	EN	▼		
Henderson petrel	Pterodroma atrata	39,974	EN	▼	Estimate is based on 19,987 pairs.	
Campbell albatross	Thalassarche impavida	43,296	VU	▲		
MacGillivray's prion	Pachyptila macgillivrayi	48,300-2,421,480	CR	▼	Best estimate for number of mature individuals is 350,000, based on an estimated 175,000 pairs. 95% confidence interval is very large.	
Antipodean albatross	Diomedea antipodensis	50,000	EN	▼	Maximum estimate, given steep declines over past two decades.	
Buller's albatross	Thalassarche bulleri	50,000-99,999	NT	Steady		
Light-mantled albatross	Phoebetria palpebrata	58,000	NT	▼	Total population is estimated to be 87,000 individuals.	
Pink-footed shearwater	Ardenna creatopus	59,146	VU	?	Total population may be as high as 150,000 individuals.	
Swinhoe's storm petrel	Hydrobates monorhis	65,000-260,000	NT	Steady		
Providence petrel	Pterodroma solandri	66,500-100,000	LC	Steady	Best estimate for number of mature individuals is 83,000.	
Salvin's albatross	Thalassarche salvini	79,990	VU	?	Total population is estimated to be 110,000 individuals.	
Indian yellow-nosed albatross	Thalassarche carteri	82,000	EN	▼	Total population is estimated to be 160,000 individuals.	
Southern giant petrel	Macronectes giganteus	95,600-108,000	LC	▲	Total population is estimated to be 150,000 individuals.	
White-necked petrel	Pterodroma cervicalis	100,000	VU	▲	Total population is estimated to be 150,000 individuals. Note that IOC taxonomy splits an additional species, the Vanuatu petrel, from this species. IUCN/BirdLife International maintain both species within P. cervicalis.	
Peruvian diving petrel	Pelecanoides garnotii	100,000	NT	▲		
Fluttering shearwater	Puffinus gavia	>100,000	LC	▼	Value is for total population.	
Least storm petrel	Hydrobates microsoma	>100,000	LC	Steady	Total population is estimated "to number hundreds of thousands of individuals, possibly millions."	
Markham's storm petrel	Hydrobates markhami	100,000-120,000	NT	▼	Total population is estimated to be 150,000-180,000 individuals.	
Fulmar prion	Pachyptila crassirostris	100,000-200,000	LC	Steady	Total population is estimated to be 150,000-300,000 individuals.	
Little shearwater	Puffinus assimilis	100,000-499,999	LC	▼	Total population is estimated to be 300,000-750,000 individuals. Note that IOC taxonomy splits an additional species, the Barolo shearwater, from this species. IUCN/BirdLife International maintain both species within P. assimilis.	
Black-footed albatross	Phoebastria nigripes	139,800	NT	▲		
Flesh-footed shearwater	Ardenna carneipes	148,000	NT	▼		
Band-rumped storm petrel	Hydrobates castro	150,000	LC	▼	Value given is for total population.	
Herald petrel	Pterodroma heraldica	150,000	LC	▼	Value given is for total population.	
Christmas shearwater	Puffinus nativitatis	150,000	LC	Steady	Value given is for total population.	
Kermadec petrel	Pterodroma neglecta	150,000-200,000	LC	▼	Values given are for total population.	
Grey petrel	Procellaria cinerea	151,500	NT	▼		
Black-vented shearwater	Puffinus opisthomelas	200,000-299,999	NT	Steady		
Grey-backed storm petrel	Garrodia nereis	>200,000	LC	▼	Value given is for total population.	
Hutton's shearwater	Puffinus huttoni	212,000	EN	Steady	Estimate based on 106,000 breeding pairs. Total population is estimated to be 300,000-350,000 individuals.	
Grey-headed albatross	Thalassarche chrysostoma	250,000	EN	▼	Minimum estimate for mature individuals.	
Stejneger's petrel	Pterodroma longirostris	262,000	VU	▼	Total population is estimated to be 400,000 individuals. Population may now be lower due to increased predation pressure.	
Scopoli's shearwater	Calonectris diomedea	285,000-446,000	LC	▼		
White-bellied storm petrel	Fregetta grallaria	300,000	LC	▼	Value given is for total population.	
Grey-faced petrel	Pterodroma gouldi	400,000-600,000	LC	▼	Total population is estimated to be 600,000-900,000 individuals.	
European storm petrel	Hydrobates pelagicus	430,000-519,999	LC	?	Total population is estimated to be 1,314,000-1,545,000 individuals.	
Black-bellied storm petrel	Fregetta tropica	500,000	LC	▼	Value given is for total population.	
Wedge-rumped storm petrel	Hydrobates tethys	500,000	LC	▼	Value given is a minimum estimate for total population.	
Ringed storm petrel	Hydrobates hornbyi	500,000-800,000	NT	▼	Total population is estimated to be 900,000-1,500,000 individuals.	
Bulwer's petrel	Bulweria bulwerii	500,000-1,000,000	LC	Steady	Values given are for total population.	
Cory's shearwater	Calonectris borealis	504,000-507,000	LC	?		
Black storm petrel	Hydrobates melania	600,000	LC	▼		
White-headed petrel	Pterodroma lessonii	600,000	LC	▼	Value given is for total population.	
Cook's petrel	Pterodroma cookii	670,000	VU	▲		
Manx shearwater	Puffinus puffinus	680,000-790,000	LC	?	Total population is estimated to be 1,026,000-1,177,500 individuals.	
Murphy's petrel	Pterodroma ultima	800,000-1,000,000	LC	?	Values given are for total population.	
Bonin petrel	Pterodroma hypoleuca	1,000,000	LC	▼	Value given is for total population.	
Kerguelen petrel	Aphrodroma brevirostris	1,000,000	LC	▼	Value given is for total population.	
Black-browed albatross	Thalassarche melanophrys	1,400,000	LC	▲		
Mottled petrel	Pterodroma inexpectata	>1,500,000	NT	▼	Value given is for total population.	
Great-winged petrel	Pterodroma macroptera	>1,500,000	LC	▼	Value given is for total population.	
Laysan albatross	Phoebastria immutabilis	1,600,000	NT	Steady		
Atlantic petrel	Pterodroma incerta	1,800,000	EN	▼		
Juan Fernández petrel	Pterodroma externa	2,000,000	VU	Steady	Total population was estimated to be, at minimum, 3.0 million individuals in 1986, but population appears to remain steady.	
Cape petrel (Pintado petrel)	Daption capense	>2,000,000	LC	Steady	Value given is for total population.	
Buller's shearwater	Ardenna bulleri	2,500,000	VU	Steady	Value given is for total population. Estimate is dated; current population is likely lower.	
White-chinned petrel	Procellaria aequinoctialis	3,000,000	VU	▼		
Streaked shearwater	Calonectris leucomelas	3,000,000	NT	▼	Value given is for total population.	
Blue petrel	Halobaena caerulea	>3,000,000	LC	▼	Value given is for total population.	
Southern fulmar	Fulmarus glacialoides	4,000,000	LC	Steady	Value given is for total population.	
Fork-tailed storm petrel	Hydrobates furcatus	4,000,000	LC	▲	Total population is estimated to be 6.0 million individuals.	
White-faced storm petrel	Pelagodroma marina	>4,000,000	LC	▼	Value given is for total population.	
Snow petrel	Pagodroma nivea	>4,000,000	LC	Steady	Value given is for total population.	
Fairy prion	Pachyptila turtur	5,000,000	LC	Steady	Value given is for total population.	
Soft-plumaged petrel	Pterodroma mollis	>5,000,000	LC	Steady	Value given is for total population.	
Wedge-tailed shearwater	Ardenna pacifica	>5,200,000	LC	▼	Value given is for total population.	
Slender-billed prion	Pachyptila belcheri	>7,000,000	LC	Steady	Value given is for total population.	
Black-winged petrel	Pterodroma nigripennis	8,000,000-10,000,000	LC	▼	Values given are for total population.	
Wilson's storm petrel	Oceanites oceanicus	8,000,000-20,000,000	LC	Steady	Total population is estimated to be 12.0-30.0 million individuals.	
Sooty shearwater	Ardenna grisea	8,800,000	NT	▼	Total population is estimated to be 19.0-23.6 million individuals.	
Great shearwater	Ardenna gravis	10,000,000	LC	Steady	Total population is estimated to number more than 15.0 million individuals.	
Antarctic petrel	Thalassoica antarctica	10,000,000-20,000,000	LC	Steady	Values given are for total population.	
South Georgia diving petrel	Pelecanoides georgicus	12,000,000	LC	▼	Total population is estimated to be 15.0 million individuals.	
Salvin's prion	Pachyptila salvini	>12,000,000	LC	Steady	Value given is for total population.	
Leach's storm petrel	Hydrobates leucorhous	13,400,000-16,600,000	VU	▼	Total population is estimated to be more than 20,000,000 individuals.	
Northern fulmar	Fulmarus glacialis	14,000,000	LC	▲	Total population is estimated to be 20,000,000 individuals.	
Broad-billed prion	Pachyptila vittata	>15,000,000	LC	▼	Value given is for total population.	
Common diving petrel	Pelecanoides urinatrix	>16,000,000	LC	▼	Value given is for total population.	
Short-tailed shearwater	Ardenna tenuirostris	>23,000,000	LC	▼	Value given is for total population.	
Antarctic prion	Pachyptila desolata	50,000,000	LC	▼	Value given is for total population.	

== Species without population estimates ==
Common name	Binomial name	Population	Status	Trend	Notes	Image
Bannerman's shearwater	Puffinus bannermani	unknown	EN	▼		
Tropical shearwater	Puffinus bailloni	unknown	LC	Steady	Some wide-ranging estimates indicate there are at least 28,100 total individuals, but many more breeding colonies remain unsurveyed.	
Subantarctic shearwater	Puffinus elegans	unknown	LC	▼	Population has not been formally estimated, though extrapolation from data in 2004 presented an estimate of "several hundred thousand pairs."	

== See also ==
- Lists of birds by population
- Lists of organisms by population
