= List of Podicipediformes by population =

This is a list of Podicipediformes species by global population. While numbers are estimates, they have been made by the experts in their fields. For more information on how these estimates were ascertained, see Wikipedia's articles on population biology and population ecology.

The IOC World Bird List (version 15.1) recognizes 23 species of Podicipediformes, three of which are extinct. IUCN/BirdLife International have assessed and quantified population sizes for 22 of these species, excepting tricolored grebe. Additionally, IUCN/BirdLife International recognize a split in silvery grebe into northern and southern species.

There are three species listed as members of Podicipediformes which are extinct. They are as follows:

- Alaotra grebe (Tachybaptus rufolavatus) - declared extinct in 2010, but last sighted in 1985.
- Atitlán grebe (Podilymbus gigas) - species declared extinct in 1986, following rapid decline.
- Colombian grebe (Podiceps andinus) - last confirmed sighting in 1977.

== Species by global population ==
Common name	Binomial name	Population	Status	Trend	Notes	Image
Junin grebe	Podiceps taczanowskii	140-320	EN	▼	Endemic to Lake Junín, Peru.	
Hooded grebe	Podiceps gallardoi	650-800	CR	Steady	Total population estimated at 3,000 – 5,000 in mid-1980s.	
Madagascar grebe	Tachybaptus pelzelnii	1,000-2,499	EN	▼		
New Zealand grebe	Poliocephalus rufopectus	1,000-5,000	LC	▲	Best estimate for breeding population is 2,000-4,000 individuals.	
Hoary-headed grebe	Poliocephalus poliocephalus	16,600-670,000	LC	Steady	Total population is estimated to be 25,000-1,000,000 individuals.	
Australasian grebe	Tachybaptus novaehollandiae	16,800-687,000	LC	?	Total population is estimated to be 25,203-1,031,000 individuals.	
Least grebe	Tachybaptus dominicus	20,000-500,000	LC	Steady		
Great grebe	Podiceps major	26,700-93,300	LC	Steady	Total population is estimated to be 40,000-140,000 individuals.	
Southern silvery grebe (Silvery grebe)	Podiceps occipitalis	67,700-68,500	LC	Steady	Note that IUCN/BirdLife International list the Northern silvery grebe (P. juninensis) as a separate species. Population has not been quantified, but it is listed as Near Threatened. IOC retains this species as a subspecies within P. occipitalis.	
White-tufted grebe	Rollandia rolland	68,800-70,100	LC	Steady	Total population is estimated to be 103,250-105,200 individuals.	
Western grebe	Aechmophorus occidentalis	80,000-90,000	LC	Steady		
Clark's grebe	Aechmophorus clarkii	81,000	LC	▼		
Red-necked grebe	Podiceps grisegena	190,000-290,000	LC	▼	Values provided are an estimate of the total population.	
Horned grebe	Podiceps auritus	239,000-583,000	VU	▼	Values provided are an estimate of the total population.	
Little grebe	Tachybaptus ruficollis	384,000-2,350,000	LC	?	Total population is estimated to be 575,997-3,525,996 individuals. Note that the IOC has split the tricolored grebe from this species. IUCN/BirdLife International maintain both species within T. ruficollis.	
Pied-billed grebe	Podilymbus podiceps	500,000	LC	▲		
Great crested grebe	Podiceps cristatus	609,999-997,000	LC	?	Total population is estimated to be 915,000-1,400,000 individuals.	
Black-necked grebe	Podiceps nigricollis	3,900,000-4,200,000	LC	?	Values provided are an estimate of the total population.	

== See also ==
- Lists of birds by population
- Lists of organisms by population
