= List of Anseriformes by population =

List of duck, goose, swan, and screamer populations

This is a list of Anseriformes species by global population. Where possible, estimates are given for both the population of mature individuals, and the total global population. This list follows IUCN classifications for species names and taxonomy. Where IUCN classifications differ from other ornithological authorities, alternative names and species classifications are noted.

Anseriformes (Anser being Latin for "goose") is the taxonomic order to which the ducks, geese, swans, and screamers belong. Version 15.1 (2025) of the IOC World Bird List describes 178 species belonging to Anseriformes, six of which are extinct. As of December 2025, BirdLife International has assessed 176 species (excepting Mexican Duck and the split of Taiga/Tundra bean goose); 168 (95% of assessed species) have had total or breeding population estimated. A variety of methods are used for counting waterfowl. For example, in North America, national and sub-national agencies use planes and helicopters to make aerial transects of breeding populations, and extrapolate these counts over the species' known ranges. Methodologies are continuously being refined; thus estimates can be expected to become more accurate over time. Forecasts can be made by studying habitat condition trends and by interviewing local experts. For more information on how these estimates were ascertained, see Wikipedia's articles on population biology and population ecology.

The first two birds in this list, the pink-headed duck and crested shelduck, retain a status of Critically Endangered on the IUCN Red List but may be extinct. The last sighting of the former occurred in 1948-1949, but some dispute this date and argue the species was last reliably documented in the 1930s, 1923, or 1910. The last pink-headed ducks in captivity died in the 1940s. Unconfirmed reports from Myanmar provide some hope this species is still extant.

The last confirmed reporting of the crested shelduck was in 1964 near Vladivostok. A disputed record from North Korea was claimed in March 1971. Unconfirmed reports from Northeast China are the best chance this species is still extant. To be assessed as Critically Endangered, a species must have experienced a decline of at least 80% in the past ten years or three generations, or be projected to decline that much in the future ten years or three generations. Some species included in this list are rapidly approaching their minimum viable population (MVP), at which point the species would become functionally extinct.

== Extinct species ==
- Réunion shelduck or Réunion sheldgoose; Alopochen kervazoi: known only from fossils; extinct by 1710.
- Mauritius shelduck or Mauritius sheldgoose; Alopochen mauritania: described by Johannes Pretorius (as sheldgoose) in 1669; extinct by 1698.
- Amsterdam duck or Amsterdam wigeon; Mareca marecula: known from fossils, extinct by 1793 due to hunting and introduced rats.
- Mauritius duck or Mascarene teal; Anas theodori: early explorers described "a great number of grey teal" on Mauritius in 1681, which may have referred to this bird. Last reported in 1696.
- Mariana mallard; Anas oustaleti: considered by some taxonomists to be a subspecies of the mallard or American black duck. Last known individual died in captivity in 1981.
- Finsch's duck; Chenonetta finschi: once very abundant, went extinct between 1250-1860.
- Labrador duck; Camptorhynchus labradorius: hunted to extinction; last seen in 1875.
- New Zealand merganser or Auckland Island merganser; Mergus australis: hunted to extinction; last recorded in 1902.

== Species by global population ==
Common name	Binomial name	Population	Status	Trend	Notes	Image
Pink-headed duck	Rhodonessa caryophyllacea	0-49	CR	?	May be extinct. No documented sightings have occurred since the early 20th century.	Rhodonessa Caryophyllacea Pink headed duck India
Crested shelduck	Tadorna cristata	1-49	CR	?	May be extinct. Last reliable sighting occurred in 1964.	
Madagascar pochard	Aythya innotata	30-50	CR	Steady	Rediscovered in 2006. Best estimate of current mature individuals is 45.	
Brazilian merganser	Mergus octosetaceus	50-249	CR	▼	This is a precautionary estimate. Actual population may exceed this estimate.	
White-winged duck	Asarcornis scutulata	150-450	CR	▼		
Baer's pochard	Aythya baeri	150-700	CR	▼		
Laysan duck	Anas laysanensis	500-680	CR	▲	The U.S. Fish & Wildlife Service estimated in 2022 that total population contains 1413 individuals between populations on Laysan, Midway, and Kure.	Laysan Duck pair on Eastern Island on Midway Atoll (14997442439)
Campbell teal	Anas nesiotis	> c. 500	VU	Steady	No formal count has been conducted. This is an opportunistic estimate.	
Madagascar teal (Bernier's teal)	Anas bernieri	630-1,900	EN	▼	Total population is not given. This estimate for mature individuals is based on multiple counts.	
Hawaiian duck	Anas wyvilliana	700-999	VU	▲	Total population estimated at 751-1,185 individuals.	
Auckland teal	Anas aucklandica	330-1,700 1,000-1,700	NT	Steady	First given estimate is obtained from considering multiple counts over the years. The second is purely the 2021 estimate.	
Andaman teal	Anas albogularis	1,000-2,500	NT	Steady	Estimate is for mature individuals only; numbers may be higher.	
Meller's duck	Anas melleri	1,300-3,300	EN	▼	Total population estimated at 2,000-5,000 individuals.	
Blue duck	Hymenolaimus malacorhynchos	1,500-2,499	EN	▼		
Brown teal	Anas chlorotis	1,600-2,200	NT	▲	Total population estimated at 2,400-3,400 individuals.	
Hawaiian goose (Nēnē)	Branta sandvicensis	1,700-2,200	NT	▲		
Scaly-sided merganser	Mergus squamatus	2,000-3,500	EN	▼		
Spectacled duck (Bronze-winged teal)	Speculanas specularis	2,500-9,999	NT	▼	Population size has not been directly estimated. Number of mature individuals likely toward lower end of estimate.	
Blue-winged goose	Cyanochen cyanoptera	3,000-7,000	NT	▼		
White-headed steamerduck (Chubut steamer duck)	Tachyeres leucocephalus	3,400-3,700	VU	▼	Total population estimated at 5,300-5,600 individuals from a count in 2011.	
Maccoa duck	Oxyura maccoa	4,800-5,700	EN	▼	Estimate from observations in East and South Africa.	
White-headed duck	Oxyura leucocephala	5,300-8,700	EN	▼	Total population estimated at 7,900-20,000 individuals based on separate metrics. A large portion of the population (central Asia) is likely not recorded.	
West Indian whistling-duck	Dendrocygna arborea	6,000-15,000	NT	▼	Total population conservatively estimated at 10,000-19,999 individuals.	
Spotted whistling-duck	Dendrocygna guttata	6,700-17,000	LC	Steady	Total population estimated at 10,000-25,000 individuals.	
Magellanic steamerduck (Flightless steamer duck; Fuegian steamer duck)	Tachyeres pteneres	6,700-67,000	LC	Steady	There is little to no evidence of any declines in population, so assumed to be stable. There is no total population estimate.	Tachyeres pteneres (Fuegian Steamer Duck - Magellan-Dampfschiffente) - Weltvogelpark Walsrode 2012-10
Coscoroba swan	Coscoroba coscoroba	7,000-19,999	LC	Steady	Total population estimated at 10,000-25,000 individuals.	
Freckled duck	Stictonetta naevosa	7,300-17,000	LC	Steady	Total population estimated at 11,000-26,000 individuals.	
Flying steamerduck	Tachyeres patachonicus	7,300-18,000	LC	▼	Global population is estimated at 11,000-26,000 individuals. Falkland Islands population is estimated at 600–1,200 total birds.	
White-backed duck	Thalassornis leuconotus	8,500-20,000	LC	▼	Total population estimated at 13,000-30,000 individuals.	
Salvadori's teal	Salvadorina waigiuensis	>10,000	LC	?	Population size has not been quantified. Estimate given is based on extremely rough estimates for LC classification.	
Black-headed duck	Heteronetta atricapilla	10,000-25,000*	LC	?	*This population estimate is an outdated best guess, and likely a large underestimate. It has not been censused over most of its range.	Heteronetta atricapilla 250319165
Marbled duck	Marmaronetta angustirostris	10,000-42,000	NT	▼	Total population is estimated at 15,000-61,250 individuals. Species counts come from four discrete flyways, some of which are outdated.	
Sunda teal	Anas gibberifrons	10,000-100,000	LC	?	Total population is unknown.	
Cape Barren goose	Cereopsis novaehollandiae	11,000-12,000	LC	Steady	Total population estimated at 16,000-18,000 individuals.	
Blue-billed duck	Oxyura australis	11,000-19,000	LC	Steady	Best estimate for number of mature individuals is 15,000.	
Torrent duck	Merganetta armata	13,300-23,500	LC	▼	Total population estimated to be 20,000-35,200 individuals.	
Cape shoveler	Spatula smithii	13,300-33,300	LC	▲	Total population estimated to be 20,000-50,000 individuals.	
Radjah shelduck	Radjah radjah	13,300-133,000	LC	▼	Total population is estimated to be 20,000-200,000 individuals.	Radjah radjah 583099046
Philippine duck	Anas luzonica	15,000-30,000	LC	Steady	Total population is estimated to fall between 20,000 and 40,000 from post-2020 censuses.	
Orinoco goose	Neochen jubata	15,000-40,000	LC	▼		
Lesser white-fronted goose	Anser erythropus	16,000-27,000	VU	▼	Global population estimated to be 24,000-40,000 individuals. Current European breeding population estimated ~420 birds.	
Masked duck	Nomonyx dominicus	16,000-200,000	LC	Steady	These are extreme estimates due to uncertainty on population.	
Comb duck	Sarkidiornis sylvicola	16,700-66,700	LC	▼	Total population estimated to be 25,000-100,000 individuals.	
Horned screamer	Anhima cornuta	16,700-66,700	LC	Steady	Total population estimated to be 25,000-100,000 individuals.	Anhima cornuta (Vincent Vos)
Ashy-headed goose	Chloephaga poliocephala	16,700-66,700	LC	▼	Total population estimated to be 25,000-100,000 individuals.	Chloephaga poliocephala -Patagonia-8
Andean goose	Chloephaga melanoptera	16,700-66,700	LC	Steady	Total population estimated to be 25,000-100,000 individuals.	Andengans Chloephaga melanoptera 050805
Hartlaub's duck	Pteronetta hartlaubii	16,700-73,300	LC	▼	Total population estimated to be 25,001-110,000 individuals.	
Red shoveler	Spatula platalea	16,700-667,000	LC	Steady	Total population is estimated to be 25,000-1,000,000 individuals.	Spatula platalea 295509101
Cape teal	Anas capensis	17,200-55,000	LC	▼	Total population is estimated to be 25,751-82,500 individuals.	Cape Teal (Anas capensis) (2)
Black-necked swan	Cygnus melancoryphus	17,300-67,900	LC	Steady	Total population is estimated to be 25,900-101,800 individuals.	Black-necked swan (Cygnus melancoryphus) Santiago
Red-breasted goose	Branta ruficollis	19,000-48,000	VU	▼	Best estimate for breeding population is 33,000. Total population estimated to be 28,100-72,600.	
African black duck	Anas sparsa	19,400-46,700	LC	▼	Total population is estimated to be 29,100-70,100 individuals.	African Black Duck, Anas sparsa at Rietvlei Nature Reserve - 49151862582
South African shelduck	Tadorna cana	20,000	LC	▼	Total population is estimated to be 30,000 individuals.	Tadorna cana, Etosha NP, Namibia 311071331
Andean teal	Anas andium	20,000-30,000	LC	▼	Total population estimated to be <40,000 individuals.	Anas andium Garceta barcina Andean Teal (8277653772)
Musk duck	Biziura lobata	20,000-49,999	LC	▼	Total population estimated to be 10,000-60,000 individuals.	
Southern pochard	Netta erythrophthalma	20,000-65,000	LC	Steady	Total population estimated to be 30,002-97,500 individuals.	Netta erythrophthalma 241803896
New Zealand scaup	Aythya novaeseelandiae	20,000-100,000	LC	▲		
Andean duck	Oxyura ferruginea	23,300-73,300	LC	▼	Total population is estimated to be 35,000-110,000 individuals.	
Lake duck	Oxyura vittata	25,000-100,000	LC	Steady	Values given are total estimated population size.	
Ringed teal	Callonetta leucophrys	25,000-100,000	LC	▼	Values given are total estimated population size.	
Falkland steamerduck	Tachyeres brachypterus	27,000-48,000	LC	Steady	IUCN does not provide a population estimate. Values are likely outdated, with the last survey of this species concluding in 1993.	Tachyeres brachypterus 181347302
Crested duck	Lophonetta specularioides	27,300-107,000	LC	Steady	Total population is estimated to be 41,000-161,000 individuals.	Lophonetta specularioides -Puerto Natales, Patagonia, Chile-8 (1)
Ruddy-headed goose	Chloephaga rubidiceps	28,500-54,700	LC	Steady	Total population is estimated to be 42,744-82,000 individuals.	
Southern pintail (Eaton's pintail)	Anas eatoni	30,000-40,000	LC	▼	Total population is estimated at 45,000-60,000 in Kergeulen Islands; additional 1,800-2,100 in Crozet Islands.	
Bar-headed goose	Anser indicus	32,300-36,400	LC	▼	IUCN does not report a population estimate. Values are likely outdated, with the most recent surveys coming from the late 1990s.	Streifengans - Indische Gans - Anser indicus - 03
Green pygmy-goose	Nettapus pulchellus	33,300-133,000	LC	?	Total population is estimated to be 50,000-200,000 individuals.	Green Pygmy Goose 3009
Silver teal	Spatula versicolor	34,900-136,000	LC	Steady	Total population is estimated to be 52,400-204,500 individuals.	Spatula versicolor versicolor - David F. Belmonte - 442618495
Swan goose	Anser cygnoides	36,000-43,500	EN	▼	Total population is estimated to be 54,400 individuals.	
Blue-billed teal	Spatula hottentota	36,700-141,000	LC	▼	Total population is estimated to be 55,100-211,000 individuals.	Blue-billed Teal (Spatula hottentota) at Marievale Nature Reserve, Gauteng, South Africa (20971147368)
African pygmy-goose	Nettapus auritus	38,300-213,000	LC	Steady	Total population is estimated to be 57,500-320,000 individuals.	African Pygmy-Goose (Nettapus auritus) male ... (51901666640)
Kelp goose	Chloephaga hybrida	40,000-116,000	LC	Steady	Total population is estimated to be 50,000-140,000 individuals, with two major populations split between continental South America and the Falkland Islands.	Kelp Goose SOARA
Trumpeter swan	Cygnus buccinator	50,000	LC	▲	Total population is estimated at 76,000 individuals.	Trumpeter swan (91399)
Muscovy duck	Cairina moschata	50,000-499,999	LC	▼	Values given are total estimated population size.	
Smew	Mergellus albellus	58,700-144,000	LC	?	Total population is estimated to be 88,000-216,000 individuals.	
Northern screamer	Chauna chavaria	60,000-130,000	LC	Steady	Total population estimated at 100,000-200,000 individuals.	Chauna chavaria
Knob-billed duck	Sarkidiornis melanotos	60,000-227,000	LC	▼	Total population is estimated at 90,000-340,000 individuals.	Knob-billed duck (Sarkidiornis melanotos) male
Mandarin duck	Aix galericulata	65,000-66,000	LC	▼	Values given are total estimated population size. Estimate is collated from four national populations.	
Pink-eared duck	Malacorhynchus membranaceus	66,000-670,000	LC	Steady	Total population is estimated to be 100,000-1,000,000 individuals.	Malacorhynchus membranaceus CAF - Bushell's Lagoon
Maned duck (Australian wood duck)	Chenonetta jubata	66,000-670,000	LC	Steady	Total population is estimated to be 100,000-1,000,000 individuals.	Chenonetta jubata male - Lake Parramatta Reserve
Southern screamer	Chauna torquata	66,700-667,000	LC	Steady	Total population estimated to be 100,000-1,000,000 individuals.	Chauna torquata (Vincent Vos)
Puna teal	Spatula puna	66,700-667,000	LC	Steady	Total population estimated to be 100,000-1,000,000 individuals.	Puna Teal (Anas puna) RWD
Plumed whistling-duck	Dendrocygna eytoni	66,700-667,000	LC	Steady	Total population estimated to be 100,000-1,000,000 individuals.	Plumed Whistling-Duck swimming
Hardhead	Aythya australis	66,700-667,000	LC	Steady	Total population estimated to be 100,001-1,001,000 individuals.	Hardhead male
Chiloe wigeon	Mareca sibilatrix	67,700-668,000	LC	Steady	Total population is estimated to be 101,500-1,002,700 individuals.	Chiloe wigeon (Mareca sibilatrix) male Tricao 3
Yellow-billed pintail	Anas georgica	67,900-675,000	LC	Steady	Total population is estimated to be 101,801-1,013,000 individuals.	Anas georgica -Puerto Natales, Patagonia, Chile-8 (1)
Chestnut teal	Anas castanea	70,000	LC	?	Total population is estimated to be 105,000 individuals.	Anas castanea
Indian spot-billed duck	Anas poecilorhyncha	73,300-133,000	LC	?	Total population is estimated to be 110,000-200,000 individuals.	Indian Spot-billed Duck Karanji Mysore Dec23 A7C 08345
Cotton pygmy-goose	Nettapus coromandelianus	83,300-741,000	LC	?	Total population is estimated to be 125,002-1,111,000 individuals.	
Australasian shoveler	Spatula rhynchotis	86,700-163,000	LC	?	Total population is estimated to be 130,001-245,000 individuals.	Australasian shoveler swimming in the Mawaihakona Stream in Silverstream Upper Hutt
Falcated duck	Mareca falcata	87,000-100,000	LC	Steady	Total population is estimated to be 132,500-150,000 individuals.	
Emperor goose	Anser canagicus	90,000-120,000	LC	▲	Total population is estimated to be 158,000 individuals.	
Yellow-billed duck	Anas undulata	93,300-243,000	LC	Steady	Total population is estimated to be 140,001-365,000 individuals.	Anas undulata with grass
Paradise shelduck	Tadorna variegata	100,000-120,000	LC	Steady	Total population is estimated to be 150,000-180,000 individuals.	Paradise-Shelduck-pair
Whooper swan	Cygnus cygnus	100,000-499,999	LC	▲	Best estimate for number of mature individuals is 176,000. Total population is estimated to be 264,600 individuals.	
Pink-footed goose	Anser brachyrhynchus	100,000-499,999	LC	▲	Best estimate for number of mature individuals is 387,000. Total population is estimated to be 580,000 individuals.	2019-03-25 Anser brachyrhynchus, Killingworth Lake, Northumberland 1
Wandering whistling-duck	Dendrocygna arcuata	100,000-1,000,000	LC	▼	IUCN does not report a population estimate. Values are likely outdated, with the most recent surveys coming from the late 1990s.	Wandering Whistling Duck, Nusa Dua, Bali, Indonesia 1
Black swan	Cygnus atratus	100,000-1,000,000	LC	Steady	Values given are total estimated population size.	
Australian shelduck	Tadorna tadornoides	101,000-827,000	LC	▲	Total population is estimated to be 151,600-1,240,000 individuals.	Tadorna tadornoides female 1 - Perth
Brazilian teal	Amazonetta brasiliensis	110,000-1,100,000	LC	▼	IUCN does not report a population estimate. Values are likely outdated, with the most recent surveys coming from 1990.	Amazonetta brasiliensis
White-cheeked pintail	Anas bahamensis	118,000-720,000	LC	▼	Total population is estimated to be 177,000-1,080,000 individuals.	White-cheeked Pintail RWD
Pacific black duck	Anas superciliosa	120,000-783,000	LC	▼	Total population is estimated to be 180,001-1,175,000 individuals.	
Upland goose	Chloephaga picta	125,000-270,000	LC	▼	Total population is estimated to be 188,000-405,000 individuals.	Upland goose tierra del fuego np 1.12.25 DSC 2014-topaz-rawdenoise
Steller's eider	Polysticta stelleri	130,000-150,000	VU	▼	Values given are total estimated population size.	
Lesser whistling-duck	Dendrocygna javanica	133,000-1,330,000	LC	▼	Total population is estimated to be 200,000-2,000,000 individuals.	
Ruddy shelduck	Tadorna ferruginea	134,000-198,000	LC	▲	Total population is estimated to be 201,030-297,080 individuals.	
Velvet scoter	Melanitta fusca	141,000-268,000	VU	▼	Total population is estimated to be 210,000-400,000 individuals.	Melanitta fusca (cropped)
Grey teal	Anas gracilis	147,000-747,000	LC	▼	Total population estimated to be 220,000-1,120,001 individuals.	
Barrow's goldeneye	Bucephala islandica	175,000-200,000	LC	Steady	Total population is estimated to be 260,000-300,000 individuals, though this is a rough estimate due to counting methods for populations in Alaska. European population (1600-1800 mature individuals) is Near Threatened.	
Ferruginous duck	Aythya nyroca	180,000-240,000	NT	▼	Values given are total estimated population size.	
Harlequin duck	Histrionicus histrionicus	190,000-380,000	LC	▲	Values given are total estimated population size.	
Spur-winged Goose	Plectropterus gambensis	200,000-333,000	LC	Steady	Total population is estimated to be 300,000-500,000 individuals.	Spur-winged goose, South Luangwa National Park (51866466429)
Black-bellied whistling-duck	Dendrocygna autumnalis	200,000-2,000,000	LC	▲	IUCN does not provide a total population estimate. Partners in Flight estimates breeding population at 1,000,000 individuals.	
Tundra swan	Cygnus columbianus	221,000-234,000	LC	Steady	Total population is estimated to be 332,000-352,000 individuals. European population classified as Vulnerable.	
Spectacled eider	Somateria fischeri	250,000	NT	▼	Total population is estimated to be 360,000-400,000 individuals.	
Surf scoter	Melanitta perspicillata	250,000-1,300,000	LC	▼	Values given are total estimated population size.	
Red-crested pochard	Netta rufina	300,000-440,000	LC	Steady	Total population is estimated to be 450,000-660,000.	
Mute swan	Cygnus olor	308,000-348,000	LC	▲	Total population (including introduced range) is estimated to be 461,300-522,400 individuals.	
Baikal teal	Sibirionetta formosa	333,000-467,000	LC	Steady	Total population is estimated to be 500,000-700,000 individuals.	Sibirionetta formosa 01
Black scoter	Melanitta americana	350,000-560,000	NT	▼	Total population is estimated to be 350,000-560,000 individuals.	Black scoter barnegat lighthouse sp 2.18.23 DSC 3079-topaz-denoiseraw-sharpen
Cinnamon teal	Spatula cyanoptera	380,000	LC	▼	IUCN does not provide a total population estimate.	A Pair of Cinnamon Teal (8600075301)
White-winged scoter	Melanitta deglandi	400,000	LC	▼	IUCN does not provide population estimates for this bird. Values given come from Partners in Flight estimate.	
Siberian scoter (Stejneger's scoter)	Melanitta stenjnegeri	400,000-700,000	LC	▼	Total population is estimated to be 600,000-1,000,000 individuals.	Melanitta stejnegeri 110567157
Red-billed teal	Anas erythrorhyncha	410,000-790,000	LC	▼	Total population is estimated to be 615,000-1,185,000 individuals.	Red-billed Pintail (Anas erythrorhyncha) RWD1
Common shelduck	Tadorna tadorna	415,000-500,000	LC	▲	Total population is estimated to be 625,000-750,000 individuals.	
Mottled duck	Anas fulvigata	464,000	LC	▼	Total population is estimated to be 695,000 individuals. Note that IUCN/BirdLife International currently consider the Mexican duck (Anas diazi) to be a subspecies of mottled duck.	MottledDuck Gam
Brent goose (Brant)	Branta bernicla	490,000	LC	?	IUCN does not provide a total population estimate. European population is 3,000-3,600 mature individuals.	
Red-breasted merganser	Mergus serrator	495,000-605,000	LC	Steady	Values given are total estimated population size. European breeding populations are classified as Near Threatened.	
Egyptian goose	Alopochen aegyptiaca	>500,000	LC	▼	IUCN does not report a population estimate. Value given is a rough estimate ca. 2008. This species is invasive on several continents, with increasing populations in at least North America and Europe.	Egyptian Goose (Alopochen aegyptiaca), Lake Ziway, Ethiopia
Magpie goose	Anseranas semipalmata	667,000	LC	Steady	Total population estimated to be 1,000,000 individuals.	
Rosy-billed pochard	Netta peposaca	667,000	LC	▲	Total population estimated to be 1,000,000 individuals.	
Bean goose	Anser fabalis	680,000-800,000	LC	▼	Values given are estimated total population size. Note that the IOU split this species into the separate Taiga bean goose and Tundra bean goose. This split has not been recognized by the IUCN.	
Canvasback	Aythya valisineria	690,000	LC	▲	No total population estimate given.	
Yellow-billed teal	Anas flavirostris	695,000-755,000	LC	Steady	Total population estimated to be 1.04-1.13 million individuals.	Pato Jergón Chico Anas Flavirostris (188076575)
American black duck	Anas rubripes	700,000	LC	▼	No total population estimate given.	
Common pochard	Aythya ferina	760,000-790,000	VU	▼	Total population estimated to be 1.14-1.18 million individuals.	
King eider	Somateria spectabilis	800,000-900,000	LC	▼	Values given are estimated total population size.	
Eastern spot-billed duck	Anas zonorhyncha	800,000-1,600,000	LC	▼	Values given are estimated total population size.	
Fulvous whistling-duck	Dendrocygna bicolor	820,000-980,000	LC	▼	Total population estimated to be 1.23-1.47 million individuals.	
Barnacle goose	Branta leucopsis	880,000	LC	▲	Values given are estimated total population size.	
Greylag goose	Anser anser	1,000,000-1,100,000	LC	▲	Values given are estimated total population size.	
Garganey	Spatula querquedula	1,030,000-1,700,000	LC	▼	Total population estimated to be 1.55-2.55 million individuals.	
Common scoter	Melanitta nigra	1,070,000	LC	?	Total population estimated to be 1.6 million individuals.	Melanitta nigra (cropped)
Hooded merganser	Lophodytes cucullatus	1,100,000	LC	▲	Values given are estimated total population size.	
Redhead	Aythya americana	1,200,000	LC	▲	No total population estimate given.	
Bufflehead	Bucephala albeola	1,300,000	LC	▲	No total population estimate given.	
Tufted duck	Aythya fuligula	1,330,000-1,730,000	LC	▼	Total population estimated to be 2.0-2.6 million individuals.	
White-faced whistling-duck	Dendrocygna viduata	1,410,000-1,700,000	LC	▲	Total population estimated to be 2.12-2.55 million individuals.	
Common eider	Somateria mollissima	1,580,000-1,910,000	NT	?	Total population estimated to be 3.3-4.0 million individuals.	
Ruddy duck	Oxyura jamaicensis	1,700,000	LC	▼	IUCN does not provide population estimates for this bird. Values given come from Partners in Flight estimate of global breeding population.	Ruddy Duck (Oxyura jamaicensis) RWD2
Goosander (Common merganser)	Mergus merganser	1,700,000-2,400,000	LC	?	Values given are estimated total population size.	
Eurasian wigeon	Mareca penelope	1,770,000-2,390,000	LC	▲	Total population estimated to be 2.65-3.59 million individuals.	
Ring-necked duck	Aythya collaris	2,000,000	LC	▲	No total population estimate given.	
Ross's goose	Anser rossii	2,100,000	LC	▲	No total population estimate given.	
American wigeon	Mareca americana	2,700,000	LC	▼	No total population estimate given.	
Common goldeneye	Bucephala clangula	2,700,000-4,700,000	LC	Steady	Values given are estimated total population size.	
Common teal (Eurasian teal)	Anas crecca	2,800,000	LC	?	No total population estimate given.	
Long-tailed duck	Clangula hyemalis	3,200-000-3,750,000	VU	▼	Values given are estimated total population size.	
Lesser scaup	Aythya affinis	3,700,000	LC	Steady	No total population estimate given.	
Green-winged teal	Anas carolinensis	3,900,000	LC	▲	No total population estimate given.	
Gadwall	Mareca strepera	4,050,000-4,860,000	LC	Steady	No total population estimate given.	
Northern shoveler	Spatula clypeata	4,300,000-4,700,000	LC	▼	Total population estimated to be 6.5-7.0 million individuals.	
Cackling goose	Branta hutchinsii	4,500,000	LC	▲	No total population estimate given.	
Wood duck	Aix sponsa	4,600,000	LC	▲	No total population estimate given.	
Northern pintail	Anas acuta	4,700,000-4,800,000	LC	▼	Total population estimated to be 7.1-7.2 million individuals.	
Greater scaup	Aythya marila	4,920,000-5,130,000	LC	▼	Values given are estimated total population size.	
Greater white-fronted goose	Anser albifrons	5,000,000-5,999,999	LC	?	No total population estimate given.	
Canada goose	Branta canadensis	5,000,000-6,200,000	LC	▲	Values given are estimated total population size. Note that current data from Partners in Flight estimate 7.1 million mature individuals alone.	
Blue-winged teal	Spatula discors	7,800,000	LC	▲	No total population estimate given.	
Snow goose	Anser caerulescens	15,000,000	LC	▲	No total population estimate given.	
Mallard	Anas platyrhynchos	17,260,000-19,300,000	LC	▼	Total population estimated to be 26.15-29.24 million individuals.	

== See also ==
- Lists of birds by population
- Lists of organisms by population
- List of duck breeds
