= List of Sphenisciformes by population =

This is a list of Sphenisciformes species by global population. While numbers are estimates, they have been made by experts in their fields.

Sphenisciformes (from the Latin for "wedge-shaped") is the taxonomic order to which penguins belong. The IOC World Bird List recognizes 19 species of Sphenisciformes. BirdLife International has assessed 18 species (95% of total species), all of which have had their population estimated. This list follows IUCN classifications for species names and taxonomy. Where IUCN classifications differ from other ornithological authorities, alternative names and taxonomies are noted.

A variety of methods are used for counting penguins, including the first census from space in April 2012, when imagery from Ikonos, QuickBird-2, and WorldView-2 satellites were used to count emperor penguins in Antarctica. Most maritime surveys use strip transect and distance sampling to measure penguin species density; this is then extrapolated over the animal's range. The Galapagos penguin has been counted annually since 1961 by the Galápagos National Park Service. For more information on how these estimates were ascertained, see Wikipedia's articles on population biology and population ecology.

Extinct species from this order include the Waitaha penguin, which went extinct between 1300–1500 (soon after the Polynesian arrival to New Zealand), and the Chatham penguin, which is only known through subfossils; however, an extant individual may have been kept in captivity by researchers sometime between 1867 and 1872.

== Species by global population ==
Common name	Binomial name	Population	Status	Trend	Notes	Image
Galapagos penguin	Spheniscus mendiculus	1,200	EN	▼		
Yellow-eyed penguin	Megadyptes antipodes	2,600-3,000	EN	▼		
Fiordland penguin	Eudyptes pachyrhynchus	12,500-50,000	VU	▼		
African penguin	Spheniscus demersus	19,800	CR	▼	Number of total adult birds is estimated to be 31,680.	
Humboldt penguin	Spheniscus humboldti	23,800	VU	▼	Values is considered the maximum estimate for breeding population.	
Snares penguin	Eudyptes robustus	63,000	VU	Steady		
Erect-crested penguin	Eudyptes sclateri	150,000	EN	▼	Population breeds in two locations: the Bounty Islands (26,000 pairs), & the Antipodes Islands (34,226 pairs).	
Northern rockhopper penguin	Eudyptes moseleyi	413,700	EN	▼		
Little penguin	Eudyptula minor	469,760	LC	Steady		
Emperor penguin	Aptenodytes forsteri	513,000	NT	Steady	Estimate based on an approximate 256,500 breeding pairs counted from satellite images.	
Gentoo penguin	Pygoscelis papua	774,000	LC	▼		
Royal penguin	Eudyptes schlegeli	1,340,000-1,660,000	LC	?	Best estimate for mature individuals is 1.5 million individuals.	
King penguin	Aptenodytes patagonicus	2,168,640-2,456,640	LC	▲	Values are an estimate for mature individuals; IUCN reports an estimated "1.1 million annual breeding pairs (range 1,084,320-1,228,320)."	
Magellanic penguin	Spheniscus magellanicus	2,200,000-3,200,000	LC	▼		
Southern rockhopper penguin (Western rockhopper penguin)	Eudyptes chrysocome	2,500,000	VU	▼	IOC taxonomic guidance splits Eastern rockhopper penguin into its own species from this species. IUCN/BirdLife International currently retain both species within E. chrysocome.	
Chinstrap penguin	Pygoscelis antarcticus	8,000,000	LC	▼		
Adélie penguin	Pygoscelis adeliae	10,000,000	LC	▲		
Macaroni penguin	Eudyptes chrysolophus	12,600,000	VU	▼	Population is estimated at 6.3 million breeding pairs; main population centres at Isles Crozet (2.2 million pairs, with 1 million on Île des Pingouins), Heard Island (1 million pairs), Kerguelen (1.8 million pairs), & South Georgia (1 million pairs).	

== See also ==
- Lists of birds by population
- Lists of organisms by population
