= List of Passeriformes by population =

This is a list of Passeriforme species by global population. While numbers are estimates, they have been made by the experts in their fields.

Passeriformes is the taxonomic order to which the perching birds belong.

== Species by global population ==
Common name	Binomial name	Population	Status	Trend	Notes	Image
Banded cotinga	Cotinga maculata	50 - 249	CR	▼		
Chestnut-capped piha	Lipaugus weberi	50 - 249	CR	▼	Total population may range anywhere from 250 -2,500 individuals. Mature individuals placed in lower band out of caution.	
Hawaiian Crow	Corvus hawaiiensis	111	EW	N/A	Last known wild individuals seen in 2002. 64 males, 40 females, 7 unsexed individuals are currently held in captivity.	
'Akikiki	Oreomystis bairdi	150 - 610	CR	▼	Total population is estimated to be 231-916 individuals.	
Araripe manakin	Antilophia bokermanni	150 - 700	CR	▼	Total population is estimated to be 779 individuals.	
Socorro mockingbird	Mimus graysoni	190 - 280	CR	Steady	Total population is estimated to be 287-419 individuals.	
Raso lark	Alauda razae	250 - 999	CR	Steady	Total population was estimated to be 855 individuals in 2015.	
Superb pitta	Pitta superba	250 - 999	EN	▼		
Grey-winged cotinga	Lipaugus conditus	250 - 999	VU	Steady	Total population is estimated to be 1,000 individuals.	
Atlantic royal flycatcher	Onychorhynchus swainsoni	600 - 1,700	VU	▼	Total population is estimated to be 1,000-2,499 individuals.	
Gurney's pitta	Hydrornis gurneyi	1,000 - 2,500	CR	▼		
Turquoise cotinga	Cotinga ridgwayi	1,250 - 2,820	VU	▼	Total population is estimated to be 1,880-4,230 individuals, assuming 10% of range is occupied.	
New Zealand rock wren	Xenicus gilviventris	1,250 - 6,000	EN	▼	Best estimate for number of mature individuals is 5,000.	
Bare-necked umbrellabird	Cephalopterus glabricollis	1,900 - 7,100	EN	▼	Values given are estimated population of mature individuals, assuming extrapolating from Panamanian population.	
Grauer's broadbill	Pseudocalyptomena graueri	2,500 - 9,999	VU	▼		
Mindanao wattled broadbill (Wattled broadbill)	Sarcophanops steerii	2,500 - 9,999	VU	▼		
Black-headed berryeater	Carpornis melanocephala	2,500 - 9,999	NT	▼		
White-cheeked cotinga	Zaratornis stresemanni	2,500 - 9,999	NT	▼		
Black-faced pitta	Pitta anerythra	2,500 - 10,000	VU	▼	Best estimate for number of mature individuals in 6,500.	
North Island kōkako	Callaeas wilsoni	3,000 - 6,000	LC	▲	Best estimate for number of mature individuals is 5,000.	
Three-wattled bellbird	Procnias tricarunculatus	3,600 - 14,000	VU	▼	Total population is estimated to be 5,400-21,000 individuals.	
Banda Sea pitta	Pitta vigorsii	5,000 - 9,999	LC	▼	Total population is estimated to be 8,300-14,500 individuals.	
Long-wattled umbrellabird	Cephalopterus penduliger	7,500-15,000	VU	▼	Total population is estimated to be 11,200-22,400 individuals.	
Graceful pitta	Erythropitta venusta	>10,000	LC	▼	No data on population size exist; however, "it is considered highly unlikely that the number of mature individuals is fewer than 10,000."	
Schneider's pitta	Hydrornis schneideri	>10,000	LC	▼	No data on population size exist; however, "it is considered highly unlikely that the number of mature individuals is fewer than 10,000."	
Yellow-bellied sunbird-asity	Neodrepanis hypoxantha	10,000 - 19,999	VU	▼	Total population is estimated to be 15,000-30,000 individuals.	
Blue-rumped manakin	Lepidothrix isidorei	10,000 - 19,999	LC	▼		
Elegant pitta	Pitta elegans	15,000 - 25,000	LC	▼	Total population is estimated to be 20,000-35,000 individuals.	
Golden-crowned manakin	Lepidothrix vilasboasi	15,000 - 137,000	LC	▼	Total population is estimated to be 23,000 - 205,000 individuals.	
Ornate pitta	Pitta concinna	20,000 - 40,000	LC	▼	Total population is estimated to be 32,000-64,000 individuals.	
Lovely cotinga	Cotinga amabilis	20,000 - 49,999	LC	▼		
Black-and-gold cotinga	Lipaugus ater	20,000 - 49,999	LC	▼	Best estimate for number of mature individuals is 44,591.	
Swallow-tailed cotinga	Phibalura flavirostris	20,000 - 49,999	LC	▼		
Cinnamon-vented piha	Lipaugus lanioides	50,000 - 99,999	LC	▼		
Blue cotinga	Cotinga nattererii	50,000 - 499,999	LC	▼		
Rufous piha	Lipaugus unirufus	50,000 - 499,999	LC	▼		
Orange-collared manakin	Manacus aurantiacus	50,000 - 499,999	LC	▼		
White-collared manakin	Manacus candei	50,000 - 499,999	LC	▼		
Bare-throated bellbird	Procnias nudicollis	80,000 - 130,000	NT	▼	Total population is estimated to be 123,165-193,545 individuals.	
Opal-crowned manakin	Lepidothrix iris	250,000-1,500,000	VU	▼	Total population is estimated to be 433,000-2,466,000 individuals.	
Lance-tailed manakin	Chiroxiphia lanceolata	500,000-4,999,999	LC	▼		
Golden-collared manakin	Manacus vitellinus	500,000-4,999,999	LC	▼		
Amazonian royal flycatcher	Onychorhynchus coronatus	500,000-4,999,999	LC	▼		
Purple-throated fruitcrow	Querula purpurata	5,000,000 - 49,999,999	LC	▼		
Common raven	Corvus corax	21,000,000-26,400,000	LC	▲		
Canada jay	Perisoreus canadensis	26,000,000	LC	▼		
American robin	Turdus migratorius	370,000,000	LC	Steady		
Barn swallow	Hirundo rustica	290,000,000 - 487,000,000	LC	▼		

== Species without population estimates ==
Common name	Binomial name	Population	Status	Trend	Notes	Image
Blue-headed pitta	Hydrornis baudii	unknown	VU	▼		
Fairy pitta	Pitta nympha	unknown	VU	▼		
Azure-breasted pitta	Pitta steerii	unknown	VU	▼		
Whiskered pitta	Erythropitta kochi	unknown	LC	▼		
Pompadour cotinga	Xipholena punicea	unknown	LC	▼		

== See also ==
- Lists of birds by population
- Lists of organisms by population
