= List of Mesitornithiformes by population =

This is a list of Mesitornithiformes species by global population. While numbers are estimates, they have been made by the experts in their fields. For more information on how these estimates were ascertained, see Wikipedia's articles on population biology and population ecology.

The IOC World Bird List (version 15.1) recognizes 3 species of Mesitornithiformes. As of December 2025, IUCN/BirdLife International have assessed the populations of all members of this order.

== Species by global population ==
Common name	Binomial name	Population	Status	Trend	Notes	Image
Brown mesite	Mesitornis unicolor	2,500-9,999	VU	▼	Total population is estimated to be 3,750-14,999 individuals.	
White-breasted mesite	Mesitornis variegatus	5,300	VU	▼	Total population is estimated to be, at minimum, 8,000 individuals.	
Subdesert mesite	Monias benschi	65,000-110,000	VU	▼	Total population is estimated to be 98,000-152,000 individuals.	
