= Lists of organisms by population =

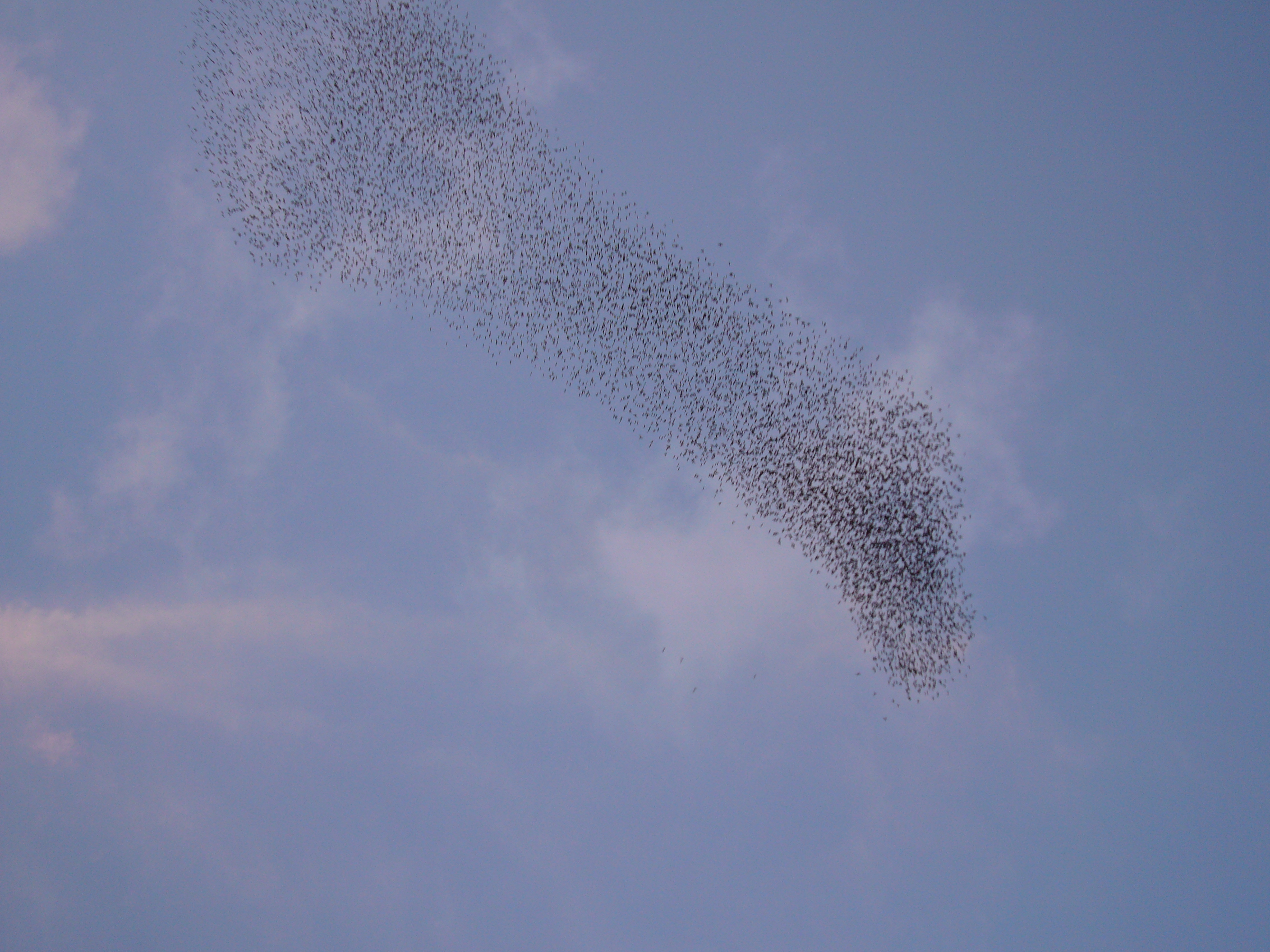
A swarm of common starlings. This species numbers over 310 million: at least as many individuals as the United States has humans.

This is a collection of lists of organisms by their population. While most of the numbers are estimates, they have been made by the experts in their fields. Wildlife population measurement is a science falling under the purview of population ecology and biogeography. Individuals are counted by census, as carried out for the piping plover; using the transect method, as done for the mountain plover; and beginning in 2012 by satellite, with the emperor penguin being the first subject counted in this manner.

== Number of species ==
More than 99 percent of all species, amounting to over five billion species, that ever lived on Earth are estimated to be extinct. Estimates on the number of Earth's current species range from 10 million to 14 million, of which about 1.2 million have been documented and more than 86 percent have not yet been described. According to another study, the number of described species has been estimated at 1,899,587. 2000–2009 saw approximately 17,000 species described per year. The total number of undescribed organisms is unknown, but marine microbial species alone could number 20,000,000. For this reason, the number of quantified species will always lag behind the number of described species, and species contained in these lists tend to be on the K side of the r/K selection continuum. More recently, in May 2016, scientists reported that 1 trillion species are estimated to be on Earth currently with only one-thousandth of one percent described. The total number of related DNA base pairs on Earth is estimated at 5.0 × 10^{37} and weighs 50 billion tonnes. In comparison, the total mass of the biosphere has been estimated to be as much as 4 TtC (trillion [million million] tonnes of carbon). In July 2016, scientists reported identifying a set of 355 genes from the Last universal common ancestor (LUCA) of all organisms living on Earth.

== By domain ==
The domain of eukaryotes represent a small minority of the number of organisms; however, due to their generally much larger size, their collective global biomass is estimated to be about equal to that of prokaryotes. Prokaryotes number about 4–6 × 10^{30} cells and 350–550 Pg of C.

== Microbes ==
It is estimated that the most numerous bacteria are of a species of the Pelagibacterales (or SAR11) clade, perhaps Pelagibacter ubique, and the most numerous viruses are bacteriophages infecting these species. It is estimated that the oceans contain about 2.4 × 10^{28} (24 octillion) SAR11 cells. The Deep Carbon Observatory has been exploring living forms in the interior of the Earth. "Life in deep Earth totals 15 to 23 billion tons of carbon".

== Animalia ==
Relative terrestrial biomasses of vertebrates versus arthropods

=== Vertebrates ===
==== Mammals (Mammalia) ====
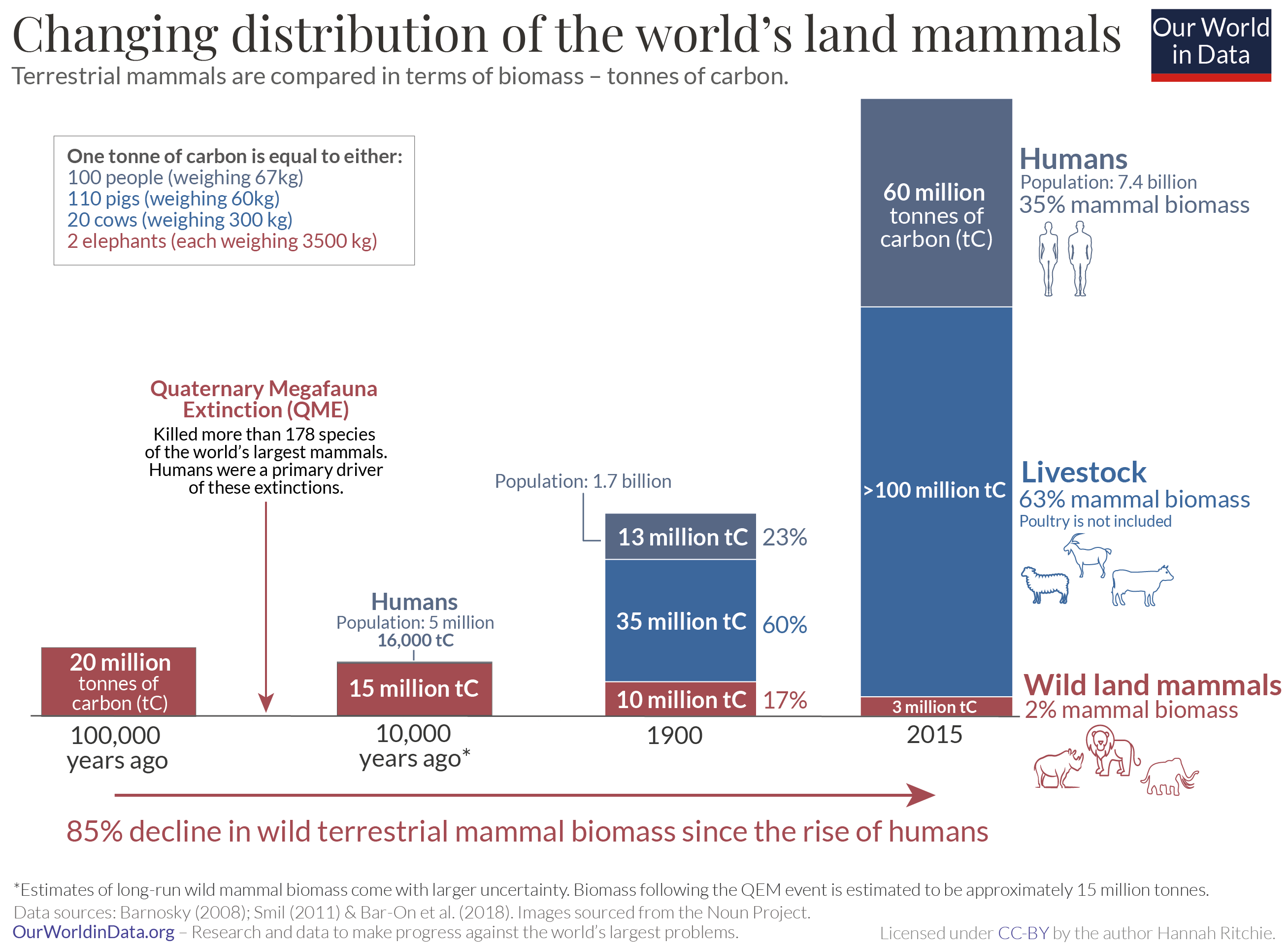
The development of the world's landbased fauna over the millennia measured in biomass

- Mammals by population
  - Artiodactyla (even-toed ungulates)
  - Carnivora (carnivorans)
  - Cetacea (cetaceans)
  - Chiroptera (bats)
  - Perissodactyla (odd-toed ungulates)
  - Primates (primates)
  - Proboscidea (elephants)
  - Marsupialia (marsupials)

==== Birds (Aves) ====
- Birds by population
  - Anseriformes (waterfowl)
  - Apodiformes (swifts and hummingbirds)
  - Caprimulgiformes (nightjars and relatives)
  - Charadriiformes (gulls and relatives)
  - Ciconiiformes (storks and relatives)
  - Columbiformes (doves and pigeons)
  - Coraciiformes (kingfishers and relatives)
  - Cuculiformes (cuckoos and relatives)
  - Falconiformes (falcons and relatives)
  - Galliformes (gamebirds)
    - The domesticated chicken (Gallus gallus domesticus), a Galliform, has an estimated population of 23.7 billion, which is higher than any other bird.
  - Gaviiformes (loons or divers)
  - Gruiformes (cranes and relatives)
  - Passeriformes (perching birds)
  - Pelecaniformes (pelicans and relatives)
  - Phoenicopteriformes (flamingos)
  - Piciformes (woodpeckers and relatives)
  - Podicipediformes (grebes)
  - Procellariiformes (albatrosses and petrels)
  - Psittaciformes (parrots)
  - Sphenisciformes (penguins)
  - Strigiformes (owls)
  - Struthioniformes (ratites)
  - Tinamiformes (tinamous)
  - Trogoniformes (trogons and quetzals)

==== Reptiles (Reptilia) ====
Animal	Population	Notes
Chinese alligator	100–200	Only in the wild. Chinese alligators are quite prolific in captivity, with estimates of the total captive population at over 10,000 animals, mostly in the Anhui Research Centre of Chinese Alligator Reproduction and the Madras Crocodile Bank.
Komodo dragon	4,000–5,000	Their populations are restricted to the islands of Gili Motang (100), Gili Dasami (100), Rinca (1,300), Komodo (1,700), and Flores (perhaps 2,000). However, there are concerns that there may presently be only 350 breeding females.

=== Hexapoda ===
==== Insects (Insecta) ====
Recent figures indicate that there could be more than 1.4 billion insects for each human on the planet, while others estimate roughly 10^{19} (10 quintillion) individual living insects on the earth at any given time. An article in The New York Times claimed that the world holds 300 pounds of insects for every pound of humans. Ants have colonised almost every landmass on Earth. Their population is estimated as between 10^{16}–10^{17} (10-100 quadrillion). With an estimated 20 quadrillion ants their biomass comes to 12 megatons of dry carbon, which is more than all wild birds and non-human mammals combined.

== Plantae ==
=== Trees ===
According to NASA in 2005, there were over 400 billion trees on Earth. However, more recently, in 2015, using better methods, the global tree count has been estimated at 3 trillion. Other studies show that the Amazonian forest alone yields approximately 430 billion trees. Extrapolations from data compiled over a period of 10 years suggest that greater Amazonia, which includes the Amazon Basin and the Guiana Shield, harbors around 390 billion individual trees.

== See also ==
- Biomass (ecology)
- Largest organisms
- List of longest-living organisms
- List of organisms by chromosome count
- Lists of animals
- Lists of extinct animals
- Lists of mammals by population
  - World population (humans)
- List of birds by population
- Primary production
- Smallest organisms
- The world's 100 most threatened species
- Latitudinal gradients in species diversity
