= Population biology =

Biological study of animal populations

The term population biology has been used with different meanings.

In 1971, Edward O. Wilson et al. used the term in the sense of applying mathematical models to population genetics, community ecology, and population dynamics. Alan Hastings used the term in 1997 as the title of his book on the mathematics used in population dynamics. The name was also used for a course given at UC Davis in the late 2010s, which describes it as an interdisciplinary field combining the areas of ecology and evolutionary biology. The course includes mathematics, statistics, ecology, genetics, and systematics. Numerous types of organisms are studied.

The journal Theoretical Population Biology is published.

== See also ==
- Ecological genetics
- Population ecology
