= Population ecology =

Field of ecology

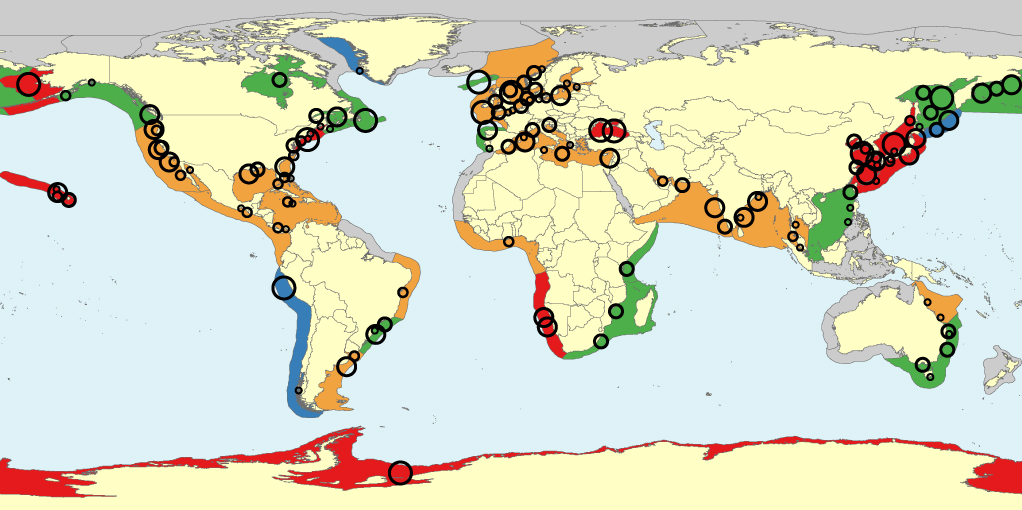
Map of population trends of native and invasive species of jellyfish in 2012 Increase (high certainty) Increase (low certainty) Stable/variable Decrease No data

Population ecology is a field of ecology that deals with the dynamics of species populations and how these populations interact with the environment, such as birth and death rates, and by immigration and emigration.

The discipline is important in conservation biology, especially in the development of population viability analysis which makes it possible to predict the long-term probability of a species persisting in a given patch of habitat. Although population ecology is a subfield of biology, it provides interesting problems for mathematicians and statisticians who work in population dynamics.

== History ==
In the 1940s, ecology was divided into autecology, the study of individual species in relation to the environment; and synecology, the study of groups of species in relation to the environment. The term autecology (from Ancient Greek: αὐτο, aúto, "self"; οίκος, oíkos, "household"; and λόγος, lógos, "knowledge"), refers to roughly the same field of study as concepts such as life cycles and behaviour as adaptations to the environment by individual organisms. In 1946 Thomas Park credited four individuals with establishing the modern view of population ecology: Carl Semper for noting how the organs of organisms are specialized to their environments; Karl Möbius for developing the biocoenosis concept; Stephen Alfred Forbes for the ideas in his essay, "The Lake as a Microcosm"; and C.G. Johannes Petersen for effectively applying quantitative methods to the study of ocean life. Eugene Odum, writing in 1953, considered that synecology should be divided into population ecology, community ecology and ecosystem ecology, renaming autecology as 'species ecology' (Odum regarded "autecology" as an archaic term), thus that there were four subdivisions of ecology.

== Terminology ==
A population is defined as a group of interacting organisms of the same species. A demographic structure of a population is how populations are often quantified. The total number of individuals in a population is defined as a population size, and how dense these individuals are is defined as population density. There is also a population's geographic range, which has limits that a species can tolerate (such as temperature).

Population size can be influenced by the per capita population growth rate (rate at which the population size changes per individual in the population.) Births, deaths, emigration, and immigration rates all play a significant role in growth rate. The maximum per capita growth rate for a population is known as the intrinsic rate of increase.

In a population, carrying capacity is known as the maximum population size of the species that the environment can sustain, which is determined by resources available. In many classic population models, r is represented as the intrinsic growth rate, where K is the carrying capacity, and N0 is the initial population size.

Terms used to describe natural groups of individuals in ecological studies
Term	Definition
Species population	All individuals of a species.
Metapopulation	A set of spatially disjunct populations, among which there is some migration.
Population	A group of conspecific individuals that is demographically, genetically, or spatially disjunct from other groups of individuals.
Aggregation	A spatially clustered group of individuals.
Deme	A group of individuals more genetically similar to each other than to other individuals, usually with some degree of spatial isolation as well.
Local population	A group of individuals within an investigator-delimited area smaller than the geographic range of the species and often within a population (as defined above). A local population could be a disjunct population as well.
Subpopulation	An arbitrary spatially delimited subset of individuals from within a population (as defined above).
Immigration	The number of individuals that join a population over time.
Emigration	The number of individuals that leave a population over time.

== Population dynamics ==
The development of population ecology owes much to the mathematical models known as population dynamics, which were originally formulae derived from demography at the end of the 18th and beginning of 19th century.

The beginning of population dynamics is widely regarded as the work of Malthus, formulated as the Malthusian growth model. According to Malthus, assuming that the conditions (the environment) remain constant (ceteris paribus), a population will grow (or decline) exponentially. This principle provided the basis for the subsequent predictive theories, such as the demographic studies such as the work of Benjamin Gompertz and Pierre François Verhulst in the early 19th century, who refined and adjusted the Malthusian demographic model.

A more general model formulation was proposed by F. J. Richards in 1959, further expanded by Simon Hopkins, in which the models of Gompertz, Verhulst and also Ludwig von Bertalanffy are covered as special cases of the general formulation. The Lotka–Volterra predator-prey equations are another famous example, as well as the alternative Arditi–Ginzburg equations.

=== Exponential vs. logistic growth ===
When describing growth models, there are two main types of models that are most commonly used: exponential and logistic growth.

When the per capita rate of increase takes the same positive value regardless of population size, the graph shows exponential growth. Exponential growth takes on the assumption that there is unlimited resources and no predation. An example of exponential population growth is that of the Monk Parakeets in the United States. Originally from South America, Monk Parakeets were either released or escaped from people who owned them. These birds experienced exponential growth from the years 1975-1994 and grew about 55 times their population size from 1975. This growth is likely due to reproduction within their population, as opposed to the addition of more birds from South America (Van Bael & Prudet-Jones 1996).

When the per capita rate of increase decreases as the population increases towards the maximum limit, or carrying capacity, the graph shows logistic growth. Environmental and social variables, along with many others, impact the carrying capacity of a population, meaning that it has the ability to change (Schacht 1980).

== Fisheries and wildlife management ==
In fisheries and wildlife management, population is affected by three dynamic rate functions.

- Natality or birth rate, often recruitment, which means reaching a certain size or reproductive stage. Usually refers to the age a fish can be caught and counted in nets.
- Population growth rate, which measures the growth of individuals in size and length. More important in fisheries, where population is often measured in biomass.
- Mortality, which includes harvest mortality and natural mortality. Natural mortality includes non-human predation, disease and old age.

If N_{1} is the number of individuals at time 1 then
$$N_1 = N_0 + B - D + I - E$$
where N_{0} is the number of individuals at time 0, B is the number of individuals born, D the number that died, I the number that immigrated, and E the number that emigrated between time 0 and time 1.

If we measure these rates over many time intervals, we can determine how a population's density changes over time. Immigration and emigration are present, but are usually not measured.

All of these are measured to determine the harvestable surplus, which is the number of individuals that can be harvested from a population without affecting long-term population stability or average population size. The harvest within the harvestable surplus is termed "compensatory" mortality, where the harvest deaths are substituted for the deaths that would have occurred naturally. Harvest above that level is termed "additive" mortality, because it adds to the number of deaths that would have occurred naturally. These terms are not necessarily judged as "good" and "bad," respectively, in population management. For example, a fish & game agency might aim to reduce the size of a deer population through additive mortality. Bucks might be targeted to increase buck competition, or does might be targeted to reduce reproduction and thus overall population size.

For the management of many fish and other wildlife populations, the goal is often to achieve the largest possible long-run sustainable harvest, also known as maximum sustainable yield (or MSY). Given a population dynamic model, such as any of the ones above, it is possible to calculate the population size that produces the largest harvestable surplus at equilibrium. While the use of population dynamic models along with statistics and optimization to set harvest limits for fish and game is controversial among some scientists, it has been shown to be more effective than the use of human judgment in computer experiments where both incorrect models and natural resource management students competed to maximize yield in two hypothetical fisheries. To give an example of a non-intuitive result, fisheries produce more fish when there is a nearby refuge from human predation in the form of a nature reserve, resulting in higher catches than if the whole area was open to fishing.

== r/K selection ==
At its most elementary level, interspecific competition involves two species utilizing a similar resource. It rapidly gets more complicated, but stripping the phenomenon of all its complications, this is the basic principle: two consumers consuming the same resource.

An important concept in population ecology is the r/K selection theory. For example, if an animal has the choice of producing one or a few offspring, or to put a lot of effort or little effort in offspring—these are all examples of trade-offs. In order for species to thrive, they must choose what is best for them, leading to a clear distinction between r and K selected species.

The first variable is r (the intrinsic rate of natural increase in population size, density independent) and the second variable is K (the carrying capacity of a population, density dependent). It is important to understand the difference between density-independent factors when selecting the intrinsic rate and density-dependent for the selection of the carrying capacity. Carrying capacity is only found during a density-dependent population. Density-dependent factors influence the carrying capacity are predation, harvest, and genetics, so when selecting the carrying capacity it is important to understand to look at the predation or harvest rates that influence the population (Stewart 2004). An r-selected species (e.g., many kinds of insects, such as aphids) is one that has high rates of fecundity, low levels of parental investment in the young, and high rates of mortality before individuals reach maturity. Evolution favors productivity in r-selected species.

In contrast, a K-selected species (such as humans) has low rates of fecundity, high levels of parental investment in the young, and low rates of mortality as individuals mature. Evolution in K-selected species favors efficiency in the conversion of more resources into fewer offspring. K-selected species generally experience stronger competition, where populations generally live near carrying capacity. These species have heavy investment in offspring, resulting in longer lived organisms, and longer period of maturation. Offspring of K-selected species generally have a higher probability of survival, due to heavy parental care and nurturing.

== Offspring Quality ==
The offspring fitness is mainly affected by the size and quality of that specific offspring [depending on the species]. Factors that contribute to the relative fitness of offspring size is either the resources the parents provide to their young or morphological traits that come from the parents. The overall success of the offspring after the initial birth or hatching is the survival of the young, the growth rate, and the birthing success of the offspring. There is found to be no effect of the young being raised by the natural parents or foster parents, the offspring need the proper resources to survive (Kristi 2010).

A study that was conducted on the egg size and offspring quality in birds found that, in summary, that the egg size contributes to the overall fitness of the offspring. This study shows the direct relationship to the survivorship curve Type I in that if the offspring is cared for during its early stages of life by a parent, it will die off later in life. However, if the offspring is not cared for by the parents due to an increase in egg quantity, then the survivorship curve will be similar to Type III, in that the offspring will die off early and will survive later in life.

== Top-down and bottom-up controls ==
=== Top-down controls ===
In some populations, organisms in lower trophic levels are controlled by organisms at the top. This is known as top-down control.

For example, the presence of top carnivores keep herbivore populations in check. If there were no top carnivores in the ecosystem, then herbivore populations would rapidly increase, leading to all plants being eaten. This ecosystem would eventually collapse.

=== Bottom-up controls ===
Bottom-up controls, on the other hand, are driven by producers in the ecosystem. If plant populations change, then the population of all species would be impacted.

For example, if plant populations decreased significantly, the herbivore populations would decrease, which would lead to a carnivore population decreasing too. Therefore, if all of the plants disappeared, then the ecosystem would collapse. Another example would be if there were too many plants available, then two herbivore populations may compete for the same food. The competition would lead to an eventual removal of one population.

=== Do all ecosystems have to be either top-down or bottom-up? ===
An ecosystem does not have to be either top-down or bottom-up. There are occasions where an ecosystem could be bottom-up sometimes, such as a marine ecosystem, but then have periods of top-down control due to fishing.

== Survivorship curves ==
Survivorship curves are graphs that show the distribution of survivors in a population according to age. Survivorship curves play an important role in comparing generations, populations, or even different species.

A Type I survivorship curve is characterized by the fact that death occurs in the later years of an organism's life (mostly mammals). In other words, most organisms reach the maximum expected lifespan and the life expectancy and the age of death go hand-in-hand (Demetrius 1978). Typically, Type I survivorship curves characterize K-selected species.

Type II survivorship shows that death at any age is equally probable. This means that the chances of death are not dependent on or affected by the age of that organism.

Type III curves indicate few surviving the younger years, but after a certain age, individuals are much more likely to survive. Type III survivorship typically characterizes r-selected species.

== Metapopulation ==
Populations are also studied and conceptualized through the "metapopulation" concept. The metapopulation concept was introduced in 1969:

"as a population of populations which go extinct locally and recolonize."

Metapopulation ecology is a simplified model of the landscape into patches of varying levels of quality. Patches are either occupied or they are not. Migrants moving among the patches are structured into metapopulations either as sources or sinks. Source patches are productive sites that generate a seasonal supply of migrants to other patch locations. Sink patches are unproductive sites that only receive migrants. In metapopulation terminology there are emigrants (individuals that leave a patch) and immigrants (individuals that move into a patch). Metapopulation models examine patch dynamics over time to answer questions about spatial and demographic ecology. An important concept in metapopulation ecology is the rescue effect, where small patches of lower quality (i.e., sinks) are maintained by a seasonal influx of new immigrants. Metapopulation structure evolves from year to year, where some patches are sinks, such as dry years, and become sources when conditions are more favorable. Ecologists utilize a mixture of computer models and field studies to explain metapopulation structure.

Metapopulation ecology allows for ecologists to take in a wide range of factors when examining a metapopulation like genetics, the bottle-neck effect, and many more. Metapopulation data is extremely useful in understanding population dynamics as most species are not numerous and require specific resources from their habitats. In addition, metapopulation ecology allows for a deeper understanding of the effects of habitat loss, and can help to predict the future of a habitat. To elaborate, metapopulation ecology assumes that, before a habitat becomes uninhabitable, the species in it will emigrate out, or die off. This information is helpful to ecologists in determining what, if anything, can be done to aid a declining habitat. Overall, the information that metapopulation ecology provides is useful to ecologists in many ways (Hanski 1998).

== Journals ==
The first journal publication of the Society of Population Ecology, titled Population Ecology (originally called Researches on Population Ecology) was released in 1952.

Scientific articles on population ecology can also be found in the Journal of Animal Ecology, Oikos and other journals.

== See also ==
- Density-dependent inhibition
- Ecological overshoot
- Irruptive growth
- Lists of organisms by population
- Overpopulation
- Population density
- Population distribution
- Population dynamics
- Population dynamics of fisheries
- Population genetics
- Population growth
- Theoretical ecology

== Bibliography ==
- Kareiva, Peter (1989). "Renewing the Dialogue between Theory and Experiments in Population Ecology". Perspectives in Ecological Theory. pp. 68–88. doi:10.1515/9781400860180.68. ISBN 978-1-4008-6018-0.
- Schacht, Robert M. (December 1980). "Two Models of Population Growth". American Anthropologist. 82 (4): 782–798. doi:10.1525/aa.1980.82.4.02a00040.
- Demetrius, Lloyd (September 1978). "Adaptive value, entropy and survivorship curves". Nature. 275 (5677): 213–214. Bibcode:1978Natur.275..213D. doi:10.1038/275213a0. PMID 692692.
- Hanski, Ilkka (November 1998). "Metapopulation dynamics". Nature. 396 (6706): 41–49. Bibcode:1998Natur.396...41H. doi:10.1038/23876.
- Bael, Sunshine Van; Pruett-Jones, Stephen (1996). "Exponential Population Growth of Monk Parakeets in the United States". The Wilson Bulletin. 108 (3): 584–588. JSTOR 4163726.
- Hubbell, Stephen P. (30 March 1979). "Tree Dispersion, Abundance, and Diversity in a Tropical Dry Forest: That tropical trees are clumped, not spaced, alters conceptions of the organization and dynamics". Science. 203 (4387): 1299–1309. doi:10.1126/science.203.4387.1299. PMID 17780463.
- Krist, Miloš (August 2011). "Egg size and offspring quality: a meta-analysis in birds". Biological Reviews. 86 (3): 692–716. doi:10.1111/j.1469-185x.2010.00166.x. PMID 21070586.
- Stewart, Kelley M.; Bowyer, R. Terry.; Dick, Brian L.; Johnson, Bruce K.; Kie, John G. (March 2005). "Density-dependent effects on physical condition and reproduction in North American elk: an experimental test". Oecologia. 143 (1): 85–93. Bibcode:2005Oecol.143...85S. doi:10.1007/s00442-004-1785-y. PMID 15586292.
