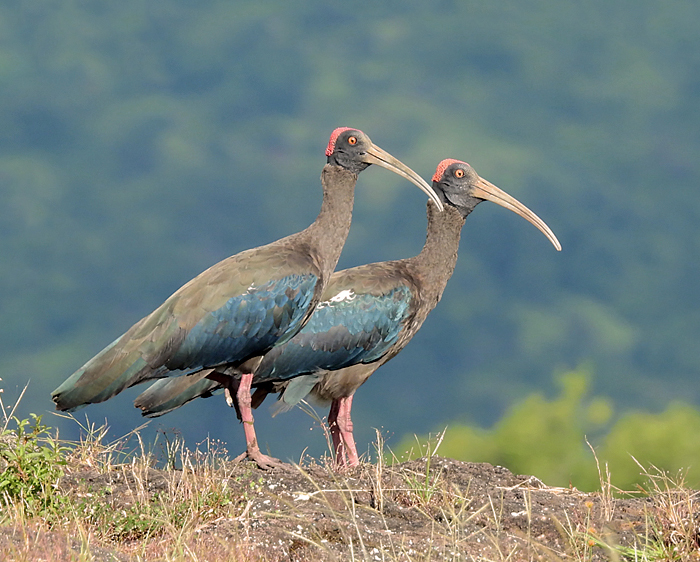
- A pair

Conservation status
- Least Concern (IUCN 3.1)

Scientific classification
- Kingdom: Animalia
- Phylum: Chordata
- Class: Aves
- Order: Pelecaniformes
- Family: Threskiornithidae
- Genus: Pseudibis
- Species: P. papillosa

Binomial name
- Pseudibis papillosa (Temminck, 1824)
- Approximate distribution range

Synonyms
- Inocotis papillosus

= Red-naped ibis =

Species of bird

The red-naped ibis (Pseudibis papillosa), also known as the Indian black ibis or black ibis, is a species of ibis found in the plains, agriculture fields and cities of the Indian subcontinent. Unlike other ibises in the region it is not found very often in waterbodies and is often found in dry fields, but are attracted more to areas that have more wetlands. It is usually seen in pairs or loose groups and can be identified by the nearly all dark body with a white patch on the shoulder and a bare dark head with a patch of crimson red warty skin on the crown and nape. It has a loud call and is noisy when breeding. It builds its nest most often on the top of a large tree or palm, and an increasing number of pairs are building on cell phone towers and electricity pillion towers.

== Description ==
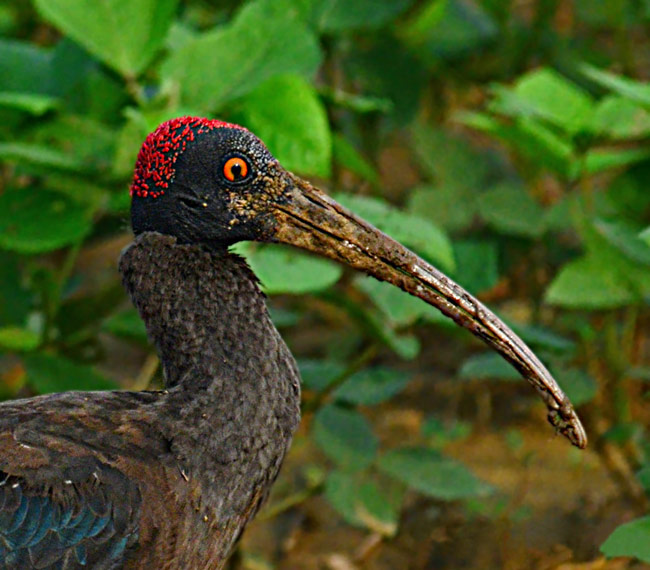
Close up of the head of a sub-adult showing the red papillae that give the species name

The red-naped ibis is a large black bird with long legs and a long downcurved bill. The wing feathers and tail are black with blue-green gloss while the neck and body are brown and without gloss. A white patch on the shoulders stands out and the top of the featherless head is a patch of bright red warty skin. The warty patch, technically a caruncle, is a triangular patch with the apex at the crown and the base of the triangle behind the nape that develops in adult birds. The iris is orange red. Both sexes are identical and young birds are browner and initially lack the bare head and crown. The bills and legs are grey but turn reddish during the breeding season. The toes have a fringing membrane and are slightly webbed at the base.

They are usually silent but call at dawn and dusk and more often when nesting. The calls are a series of loud braying, squealing screams that descend in loudness. Nocturnal calling is rare and has been observed in urban settings.

This species can be confused with the glossy ibis when seen at a distance but the glossy ibis is smaller, more gregarious, associated with wetlands and lacks the white on the wing and has a fully feathered head.

== Taxonomy ==
- - - Platalea
    - - Threskiornis molucca
      - Threskiornis aethiopicus
    - - Plegadis falcinellus
      - Plegadis chihi
    - Geronticus
    - Nipponia
    - Bostrychia
    - Pseudibis papillosa
  - New World clade
    - - - Phimosus infuscatus
        - Theristicus caerulescens
        - - Theristicus caudatus
          - Theristicus melanopis
    - - Eudocimus ruber
      - Eudocimus albus

Position within the Threskiornithidae based on Ramirez et al. 2013

The species was first given its scientific name by Temminck in 1824. He placed it in the genus Ibis but it was separated into the genus Inocotis created by Reichenbach and this was followed by several major works including the Fauna of British India although the genus Pseudibis in which Hodgson had placed the species had precedence based on the principle of priority. The species included the white-shouldered ibis as a subspecies P. papillosa davisoni from 1970s but that is now treated as a full, although closely related species. The main morphological difference between the two species is seen in the crown and the upper neck. While P. papillosa has a patch of red tubercles on the back of the crown, P. davisoni lacks it. Also, adult P. papillosa have a narrow, bright red mid-crown that becomes broader on the hindcrown, whereas, adult P. davisoni has a bare pale blue middle hindcrown that extends to the upper hindneck and forms a complete collar around the upper neck. Using nuclear and mitochondrial DNA, the species has been placed within the subfamily Threskiornithinae in a clade that includes both New and Old World members.

Measurements

India
Culmen		138–158 mm (5.4–6.2 in)
Wing		365–400 mm (14.4–15.7 in)
Tail		165–194 mm (6.5–7.6 in)
Tarsus		75–85 mm (3.0–3.3 in)

== Distribution and habitat ==
The red-naped ibis is widely distributed in the plains of the Indian subcontinent. In Rajasthan, it is common along the Aravalli mountains but entirely avoids using the trees on the mountains. The red-naped ibis uses lakes, marshes, riverbeds, irrigated farmlands, dry fallow fields, villages, towns and cities. More wetlands on the landscape attract a greater number of red-naped ibises, but birds forage largely in dry fields increasing use of wetlands for foraging during summer. In semi-arid areas, it is commonly seen in small flocks of 2–4, which could be family groups, with larger groups being relatively rare. Fewer ibises were counted in wetter locations and seasons.

It is a common breeding resident in Haryana, Punjab, Rajasthan and the Gangetic plains. It extends into southern India but is not found in the forested regions or the arid zone of the extreme southeast of the peninsula or Sri Lanka. In lowland Nepal, most foraging red-naped ibis were seen in agricultural fields, but most nests were seen in forests. Red-naped ibis commonly use villages, towns and mega-cities seeking food, nesting and roosting.

The red-naped ibis is largely diurnal in its foraging and other activities, at night roosting communally on trees or on islands. Nocturnal activities such as loud calling is rare. In semi-arid areas, they avoid potential competitive interactions with other sympatric ibis species by foraging largely in upland habitats.

== Food and foraging ==
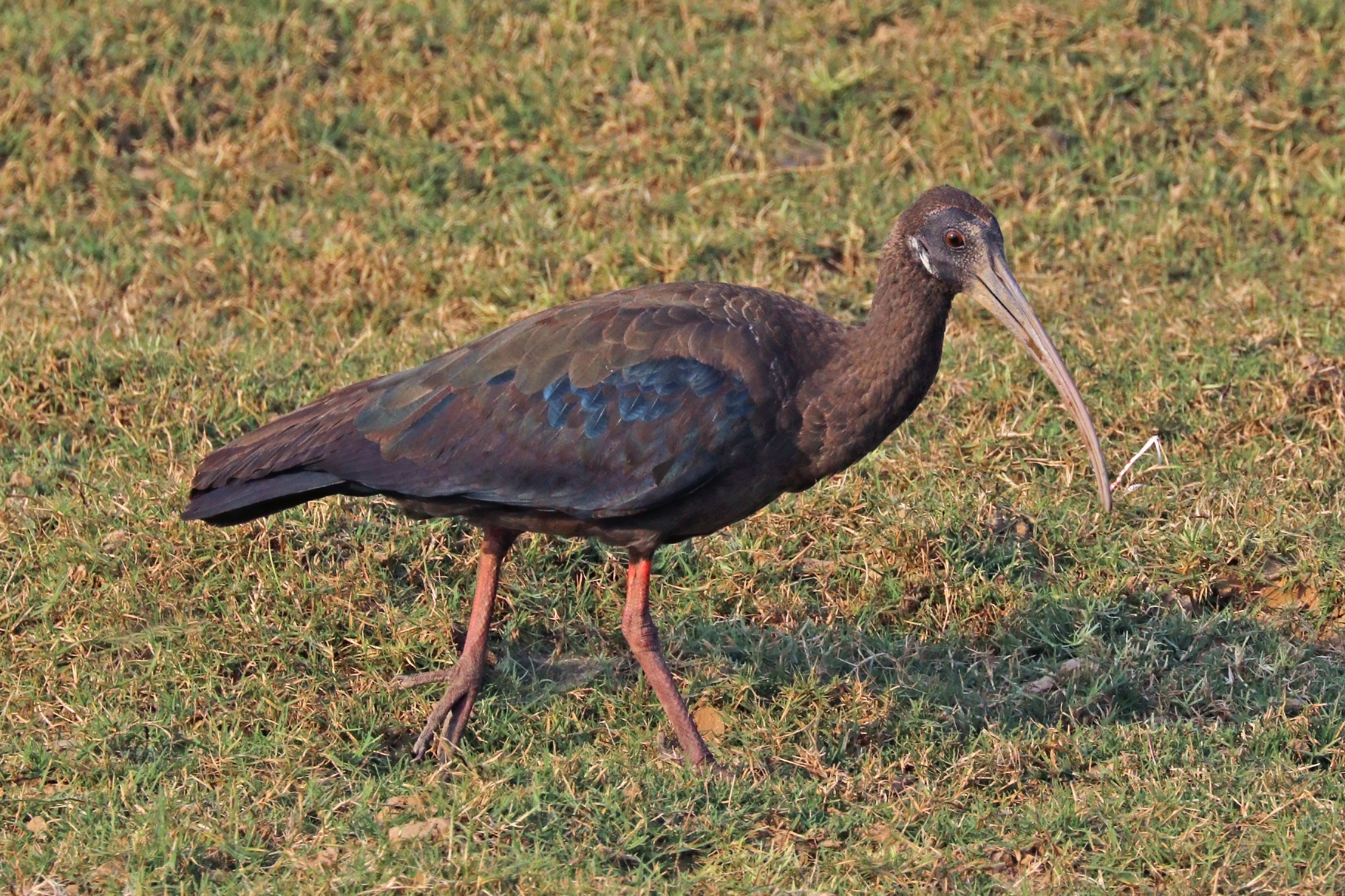
A juvenile

Early observers and investigations of stomach contents showed their diet to include crustaceans (prawns, crabs), insects (beetles, grasshoppers, crickets), scorpions, carrion and frogs. Subsequent additional observations have shown the red-naped ibis to be more omnivorous, feeding on carrion, insects, frogs, other small vertebrates, and grain. They forage mainly in dry open land and stubbly fields, sometimes joining egrets and other birds on land being tilled to feed on exposed earthworms, disturbed insects and dig for beetle grubs. They walk and like other tactile-feeding ibises, probe in the soft ground. The rarely wade in water but have been observed seeking out frogs hiding in crab holes. They feed commonly at garbage dumps eating mammal and bird carcasses. In small towns, red-naped ibis hunt adult Rock Pigeons and predate their eggs from nests on buildings. Near towns, ibises ate road kills and pulled out marrow of bones of cattle dead from collisions with traffic. During droughts they were seen feeding on carrion and insect larvae that were feeding on meat. They also feed on groundnut and other crops. In British India, indigo planters considered them useful as they appeared to consume a large number of crickets in the fields earning them the moniker "planter's friend". Adult and juveniles birds in Delhi dig into flowers of Bombax ceiba seemingly drinking nectar. Fishing by red-naped ibis is rare and has been observed in reservoirs.

Ibises roost in groups and fly to and from the regularly used roost site in "V" formation.

== Breeding ==
Red-naped ibises usually nest individually and not in mixed species heronries. There are a few observations of colonial breeding by red-naped ibis. A small colony of 3-5 nests was reported from Sind, Pakistan. Two nests on a single tree was observed in Nepal. Two pairs were seen nesting on Palmyra palms (Borassus flabellifer) in an institutional campus in Andhra Pradesh. A small but expanding colony of 20 nests spread over two large trees in a village is being monitored in Gujarat. In some towns, cities and agricultural areas with few trees, red-naped ibis built most nests on artificial structures such as electricity pillion towers, cell phone towers, and light poles. The habit of using artificial structures for nesting was not observed in studies conducted in the 1990s and seems to be recently learnt, but has been observed widely in Gujarat, Telangana and Rajasthan.

The breeding season is variable but most often between March and October and tending to precede the monsoons. When pair-bonding, females beg for food from the males at foraging grounds. Males also trumpet from the nest site. The nests are mainly large stick platforms that are 35-60 cm in diameter and about 10-15 cm deep. Old nests are reused as are those of kites and vultures. The nests are loosely lined with straw and fresh material to the nest is added even when the eggs are being incubated. The nests are usually at a height of 6–12 metres above ground, on banyan (Ficus benghalensis) or peepal (Ficus religiosa) trees, often close to human habitation. Ibis pairs copulate mainly when perched on trees. The eggs are 2–4 in number and pale bluish green in colour. They are sparsely flecked and have pale reddish blotches. Both male and female red-naped ibis incubate the eggs which hatch after 33 days. Several pairs nested within city limits in Udaipur preferring to nest on Azadirachta indica (a tree species native to India, but introduced to Udaipur city), Eucalyptus sp. (an introduced tree species to India) and Ficus religiosa (a native tree protected by religious beliefs in India). After successful fledging of chicks, Red-naped ibis nests were taken over by pairs of Red-necked Falcons (Falco chicquera) in Surendranagar district, Gujarat. In Telangana, an old nest of red-naped ibis was used by Red-necked Falcon above which was an active nest of red-naped ibis, both located on electricity pillion tower.

== Parasites ==
The nematode Belanisakis ibidis has been identified from the small intestines of the species while the feathers of ibises are host to specific species of bird lice in the genus Ibidoecus. The species found in the red-naped ibis is Ibdidoecus dennelli. Patagifer chandrapuri, a species of Digenea flatworm has been found in the intestines of specimens from Allahabad. In captivity, a trematode Diplostomum ardeiformium has been described from a red-naped ibis host. Protist parasites include Eimeria-like organisms.

== In culture ==
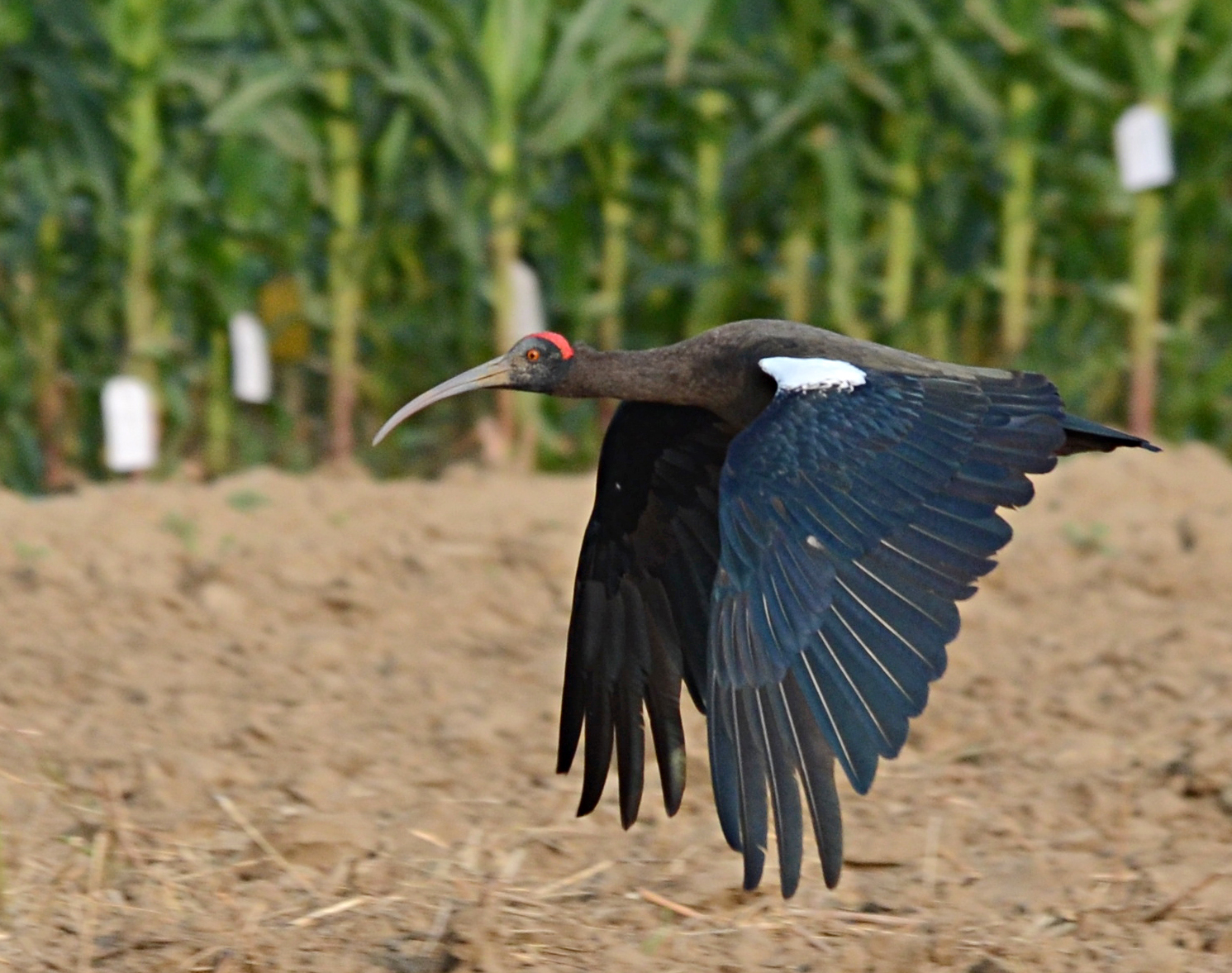
An adult in flight

The Tamil Sangam literature mentions a bird called the "anril" which was described as having a curved bill and calling from atop palmyra palms (Borassus flabellifer). Madhaviah Krishnan identified the bird positively as the black ibis and ruled out contemporary suggestions that this was a sarus crane. He based his identification on a line that mentions the arrival of anrils at dusk and calling from atop palmyra palms. He also pointed out ibises to locals and asked them for the name and noted that a few did refer to it as anrils. Sangam poetry also mentions that the birds mated for life and always walked about in pairs, one of the leading reasons for others to assume that this was the sarus crane, a species that is not found in southern India.

A number of names in Sanskrit literature including "kālakaṇṭak" have been identified as referring to this species. Jerdon noted the local names of "karankal" and "nella kankanam" in Telugu and "buza" or "kālā buza" in Hindi.

In British India, sportsmen referred to the species as the "king curlew", "king ibis" or "black curlew" and it was considered good eating as well as sport for falconers (using the Shaheen falcon). They would race and soar to escape falcons. Cultivators referred to the species as "planter's friend" based on the large number of crickets the ibises consumed on indigo plantations.

== Status and conservation ==
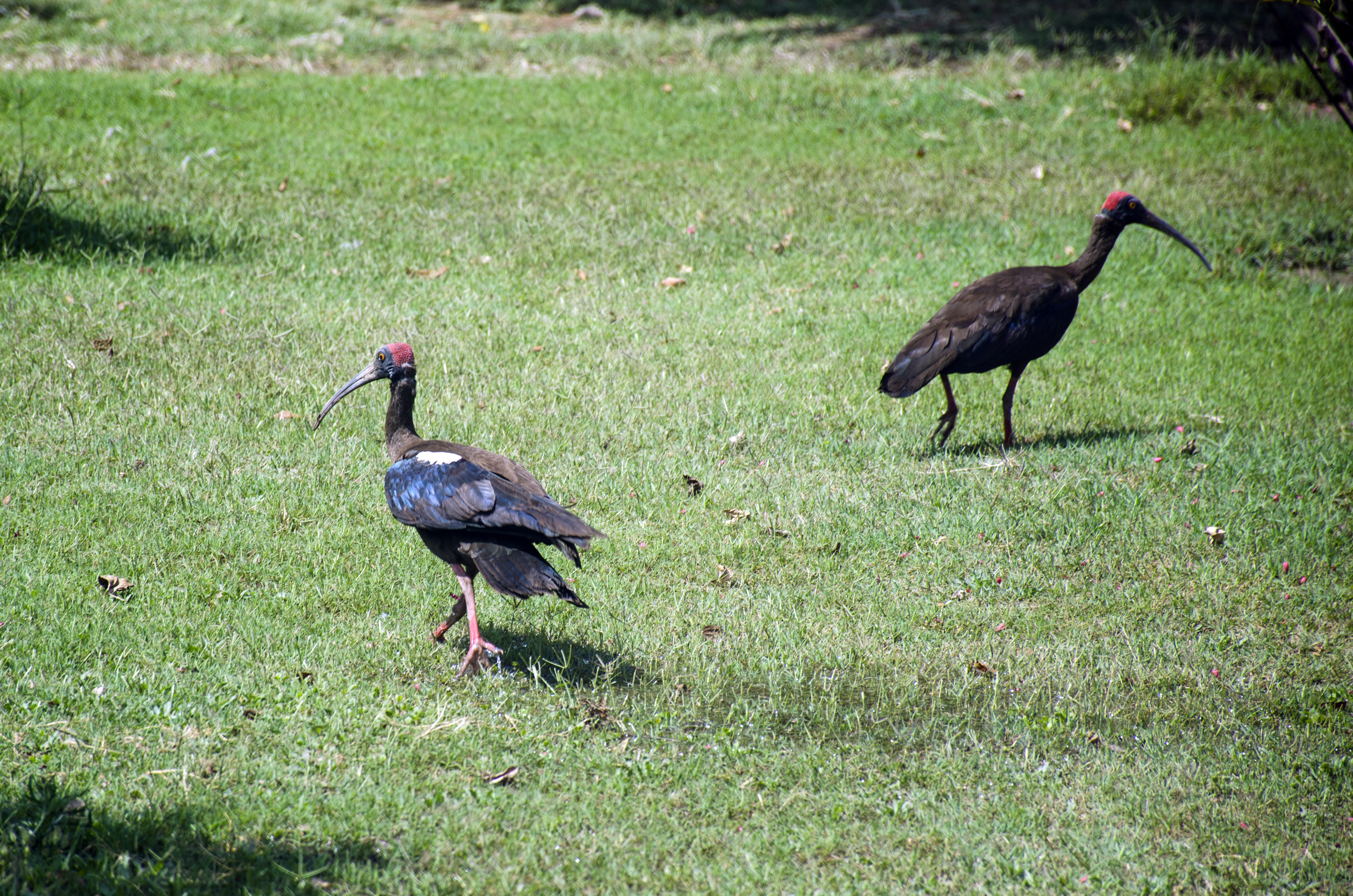
A pair of Red Naped Ibises at Mehtab Bagh, Agra

The species has declined greatly in Pakistan due to hunting and habitat loss. The species has been largely unaffected in India and they are traditionally tolerated by farmers and people in cities. DDT levels in blood plasma was 19 ng/mL in red-naped ibis - the lowest among 13 bird species sampled in a project in India.

Estimates of population density of red-naped are mostly derived from volunteer counts at wetlands. These estimates are not useful since the majority of red-naped ibis populations use upland and more dry habitats. The only robust field-based monitoring exercise for the species conservatively provides the population estimate at 20,81,800 (95% CI: 17,45,340 - 25,41,460), and this makes the red-naped ibis among the most populous endemic waterbird species anywhere. The widely varying seasonal numbers of the species makes it a challenging species to monitor. Though most ibises forage in upland and other dry habitats, more of them occur in places with more wetlands on the landscape. Red-naped ibis do not appear to have preferences for particular sized wetlands, thought having a few large wetlands on the landscape benefits populations in semi-arid areas where all the smaller wetlands dry up in the summer.

Studies in urban areas are showing the ability of Red-naped ibis to exploit city-based foods, and nest on artificial structures such as lighting poles even if these are located in busy marketplaces. Red-naped ibises may be benefitting from expanding urban areas as long as urban greening continues to provide them with nesting trees, especially in arid and semi-arid areas where tall trees for nesting are sparse on the countryside, and people continue not to persecute the birds. Expanding cereal agriculture has led to decline of trees across large areas, but red-naped ibis continue to proliferate in such areas using artificial nesting substrates such as electricity powerline towers and cell phone towers. The studies collectively suggest that the red-naped ibis may be increasing in numbers due to their behavioural plasticity, especially their ability to use a range of human-modified habitats and areas.

A few zoos including the ones at Frankfurt, Singapore (Jurong park) have successfully bred the species in captivity. An individual lived in captivity at Berlin zoo for 30 years.
