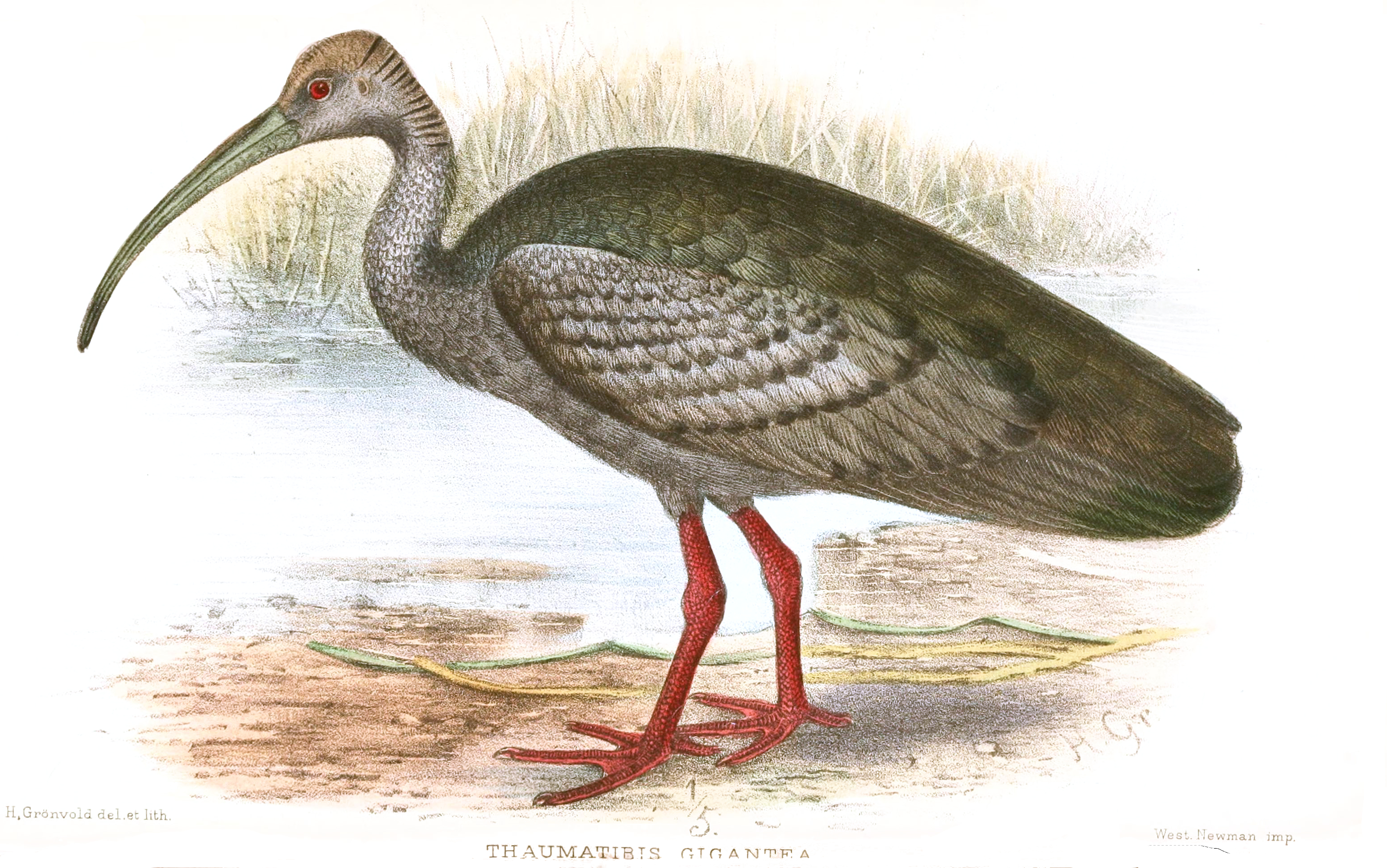

Conservation status
- Critically Endangered (IUCN 3.1)

Scientific classification
- Kingdom: Animalia
- Phylum: Chordata
- Class: Aves
- Order: Pelecaniformes
- Family: Threskiornithidae
- Genus: Pseudibis
- Species: P. gigantea

Binomial name
- Pseudibis gigantea (Oustalet, 1877)

Synonyms
- Thaumatibis gigantea (Oustalet, 1877)

= Giant ibis =

Species of bird

The giant ibis (Pseudibis gigantea) is a wading bird of the ibis family, Threskiornithidae. It is confined to northern Cambodia, with a few birds surviving in extreme southern Laos and a recent sighting in Yok Đôn National Park, Vietnam. It is sometimes placed in the genus Thaumatibis.

== Description ==
True to its name, it is the largest extant ibis species. Adults are 102–106 cm (40–41.5 in) long and weigh about 4.2 kg (9.3 lb). Among standard measurements, the wing chord is 52.3–57 cm (20.6–22.4 in), the tail is 30 cm (12 in), the tarsus is 11 cm (4.3 in) and the culmen is 20.8–23.4 cm (8.2–9.2 in). The adults have overall dark grayish-brown plumage with a naked, greyish head and upper neck. There are dark bands across the back of the head and shoulder area and the pale silvery-grey wing tips also have black crossbars. The beak is yellowish-brown, the legs are orange, and the eyes are dark red. Juveniles have short black feathers on the back of the head down to the neck, shorter bills and brown eyes.

It has a loud, ringing call, frequently repeated around dawn or dusk, a-leurk a-leurk.

== Distribution and habitat ==
The giant ibis is a lowland bird that occurs in marshes, swamps, lakes, wide rivers, flooded plains and semi-open forests as well as pools, ponds and seasonal water-meadows in denser deciduous forest. It generally is found in lowlands. One bird was collected in a Malay paddyfield. Formerly the giant ibis was believed to breed in eastern Thailand, central and northern Cambodia, southern Laos and southern Vietnam. It was still fairly common in the Mekong Delta until the 1920s but is now almost depleted, with a small remnant population breeding in Cambodia, southern Laos and possibly in Vietnam.

== Behaviour and ecology ==
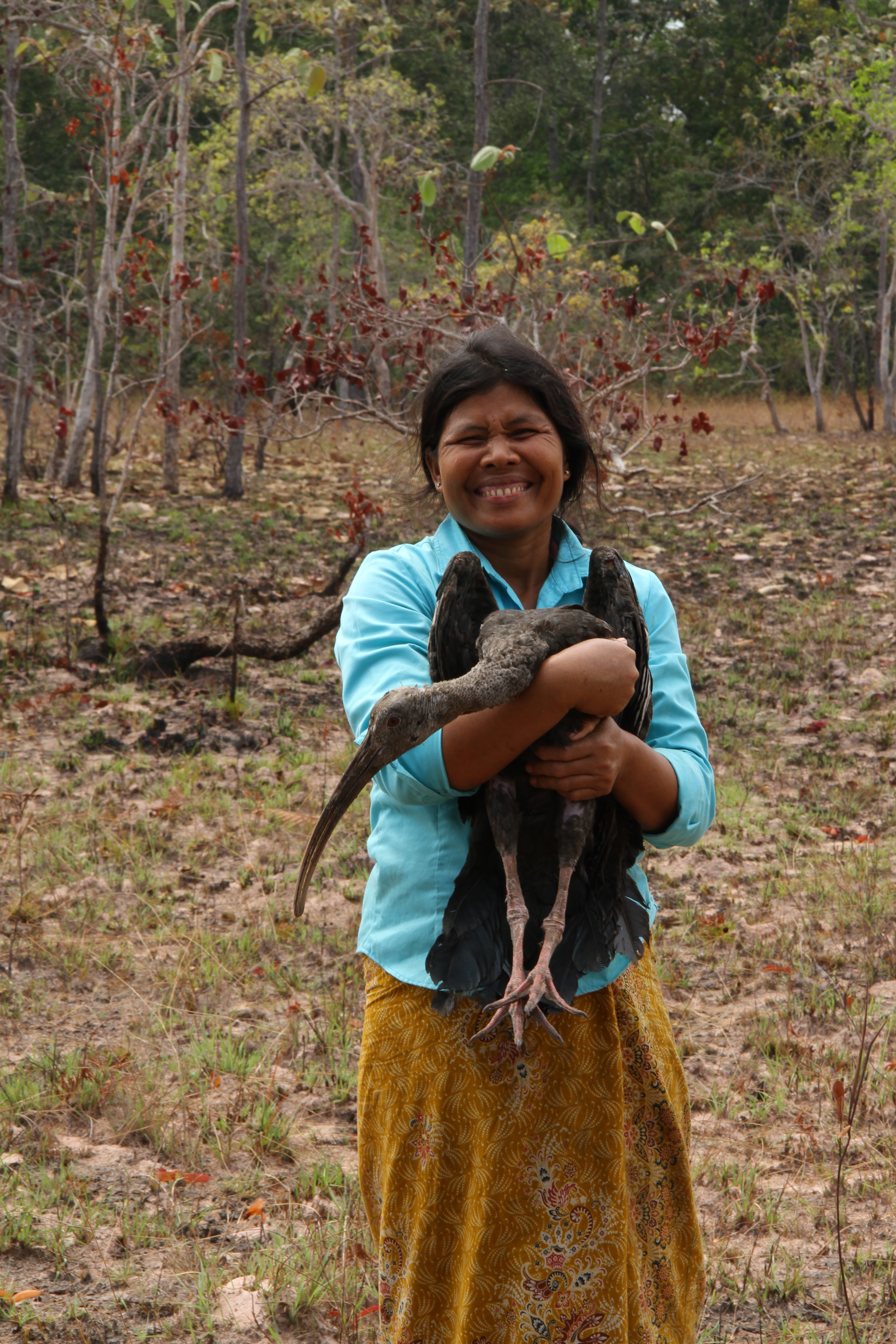
Cambodian woman preparing to release a rescued giant ibis

=== Food and feeding ===
The giant ibis eats aquatic invertebrates, eels, crustaceans and small amphibians and reptiles. Insects such as locusts and cicadas are eaten regularly when abundant and seeds occasionally supplement the diet. Outside of the breeding season, frogs and mole-crickets appear to be perhaps the most significant prey types for giant ibises. They mainly forage in muddy substrate in shallow waters, though can feed at all depths in seasonal forest pools. Feeding flocks may consist of a breeding pair or small family group and have been observed mixing with black ibises.

=== Breeding ===
Next to nothing is known of its breeding behaviour, but it nests in trees, with a possible preference for Dipterocarpus trees. Usually, nests are located at least 4 km (2.5 mi) from human habitations, although the species is not especially shy around or fearful of humans unless persistently harassed or hunted. Females lay two eggs at the start of the rainy season, around June to September. Earthworms taken from their mounds in wet grasslands appears to be an important food source for nesting ibises of this species. In general, the species is residential but can wander widely for food or in response to disturbances. The giant ibis is generally territorial and may remain with a family group throughout the year. However, in the dry season, when they are not nesting, groups of up to seven individuals, sometimes likely unrelated, have been observed feeding together.

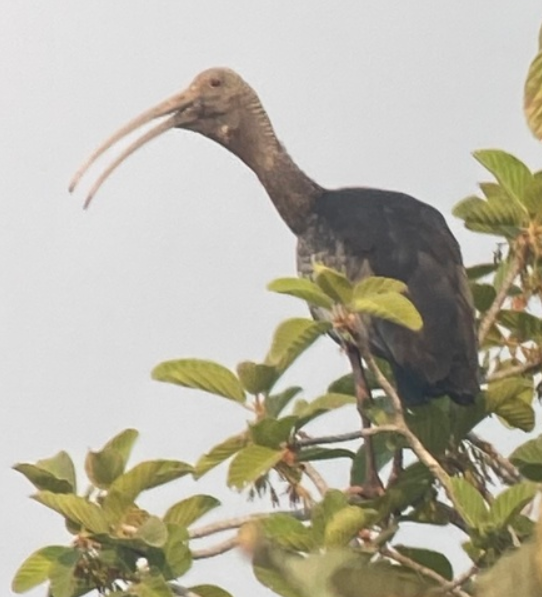
Perching in tree

== Status ==
The giant ibis is considered to be Critically Endangered on the IUCN Red List. The primary causes seem to be drainage of wetlands for cultivation and the epidemic clear-cutting of forest for rubber, cassava, wood pulp and teak plantations in south-east Asia. Habitats may also face ravaging due to local human warfare. Increasing human populations in Cambodia have in turn lead to disturbance and further lowland deforestation. The ibis may be hunted for meat by people and eggs may be predated by the Asian palm civet and the yellow-throated marten, with the species certainly unable to withstand sustained predation. A reduction in seasonal pools in forest, previously made by now depleted populations of megafauna (especially wild Asian water buffalo), may also negatively effect them. Local droughts, possibly related to global climate change, have appeared to have further compromised the breeding habitat and behaviour of the species. Some conservation efforts have been undertaken, including protecting nests by the installation of metal belts that prevent predators from accessing them, but the protection of ideal habitat and the increasing human populations in Cambodia continues to be a vexing challenge. Increasing ecotourism in the region and education to local people is clearly required for the species to successfully recover from the brink of extinction. The current population is estimated at 100 pairs, with a total population (including young and juveniles) of fewer than 500 individuals. However, even these figures may be optimistic. In 2018 the IUCN stated there were less than 200 mature individuals in the population.
