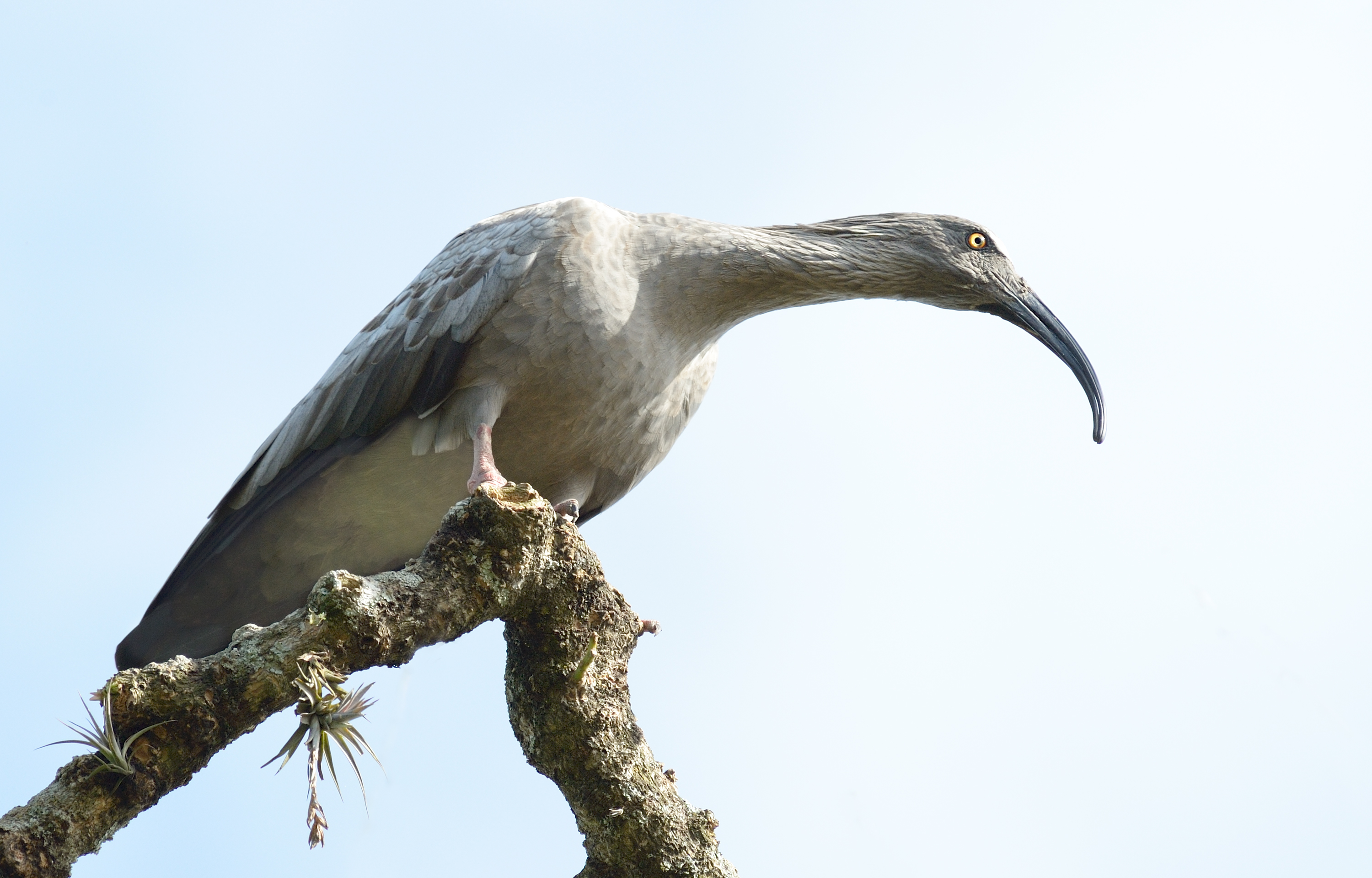

Conservation status
- Least Concern (IUCN 3.1)

Scientific classification
- Kingdom: Animalia
- Phylum: Chordata
- Class: Aves
- Order: Pelecaniformes
- Family: Threskiornithidae
- Genus: Theristicus
- Species: T. caerulescens

Binomial name
- Theristicus caerulescens (Vieillot, 1817)
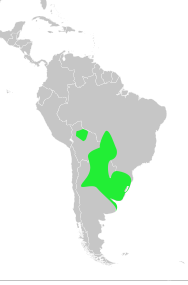
- Current resident extant range according to the IUCN 2012

= Plumbeous ibis =

Species of bird

Theristicus caerulescens

The plumbeous ibis (Theristicus caerulescens), also formerly called the blue ibis, is a large distinctive ibis species endemic to parts of central South America.

== Taxonomy and systematics ==
The plumbeous ibis has historically undergone frequent reclassification and been placed in various genera such as Molydophanes, Geronticus, Theresticus and Harpiprion. It has also been referred to as Ibis caerulescens and Theresticus (Harpiprion) caerulescens. Nevertheless, this ibis has traditionally been assigned to the monotypic genus Harpiprion, carrying the binomial name Harpiprion caerulescens; on the basis that this species was previously believed to have no close relatives. However, phylogenetic analyses based on both nuclear and mitochondrial DNA markers have suggested that the plumbeous ibis is closely related to other ibis species in the genus Theresticus such as the buff-necked ibis; given the markedly low genetic distances between the plumbeous ibis and other Theresticus species. Hence, the current placement of the plumbeous ibis in the genus Theresticus appears justified.

== Description ==
=== Appearance ===
This large ibis measures 71–77 cm in length, with a wing length of 397-450mm in males and 360-406mm in females. The culmen length is 145-167mm in males, and 126-147mm in females. The sexes are similar in appearance, but the female is slightly smaller. The plumbeous ibis is easily recognisable through a distinctive shaggy crest comprising long grey plumes that extend from the back of head 10 cm down the nape. A prominent, narrow, white feathered band also extends around the forehead, which has earned this species the German common name Stirnbandibis (headband ibis). Overall, it is readily distinguishable in the field from other ibises by its solid colouration and thick neck. The plumbeous ibis is the most morphologically similar to the sympatric buff-necked ibis Theresticus caudatus, but differs in colouration and neck structure.

The adult plumage is usually grey; but can be bluish grey, greenish grey or brownish grey. The dorsal feathers are mottled greyish-brown, so that the plumage appears lighter below than above. The flight and tail feathers are dark brown or black, superimposed with a glossy greenish bronze. It has also been reported as having various other subtle tinges on the body depending on the light. When the bird is seen in the correct light, Hudson has described the plumage as appearing silvery grey, the top of the head as dark brown with a greenish tinge, the primary feathers as dark blue, the tail as dark green, and the feathers of the throat and neck as light brown with an occasional pinkish tinge.

The black, downward-curved bill is serrated between the mandibles. The bare skin of the lores and throat is black or dark grey. The legs are a pinkish orange, darkening in the breeding season in preparation for courtship. The iris is deep orange, but has been noted to be slightly paler around the pupil. In some individuals, the iris has also been reported to be brownish yellow.

The chicks have light grey downy plumage that lacks the more sophisticated tinges in adults. Fledged young are also distinguishable from adults by a dark iris, grey legs, a less developed nuchal crest, a more extensive white band on the forehead and red bare skin patches. The white band on the forehead begins to develop in the young after 18 days of age and up close appears a brighter white than that of adults.

Through its powerful musculature, this ibis is sturdy and direct in flight; stretching out its neck and wings and steadily beating its wings with intermittent gliding.

=== Vocalisations ===
The loud vocalisations uttered by this species are diverse. The basic call is a high-pitched, rapid pi-pi-pi-pi which has a somewhat metallic timbre and can be uttered when the bird stands on the ground during daytime. This call has been said to resemble the sound of a banjo with brass strings so big that it could be heard a mile and a half away.

This ibis also makes a slow but energetic trumpeting flight call that has been transcribed as kree kreee kree or k k kuh kuh KEE KEE KEE KEE KEE KEE KEE keh kuh kuh. While making flight calls, it glides through the air with motionless downward curved wings. It also utters a nasal, high-pitched, rapid series of cackles when perched on branches or at the nest site transcribed as tututututu; sometimes interspersed with elements of ti-ti and often in duet between mates large distances apart. Another contact call is made between foraging mates and has been transcribed as a cackling kuk-kuk…kuk-kuk…kuk kuk. Overall, the broad range of loud distinctive calls of this species indicates the importance of long-range communication between individuals, especially mates.

== Distribution and habitat ==
The plumbeous ibis has a relatively narrow range that extends through parts of central South America. It occurs in south-western Brazil, especially in southern Mato Grosso and Rio Grande do Sul; Paraguay, especially in the Chaco and in the Paraguayan section of the Parana Basin; Uruguay; north-eastern Argentina and northern and eastern Bolivia. The northern Bolivian population is geographically isolated from the larger continuous population spanning the remaining part of this ibis's range. The westernmost part of its range extends into the Andean foothills in central Bolivia and Tucuman. In Argentina, it has been occasionally sighted as far south as the Cordoba and Buenos Aires provinces; but is non-native in these regions.

Although this species appears to be relatively common, it is patchily distributed throughout its global range; being relatively abundant in some regions but less so in others. For example, it is endemic but actually uncommon in Rio Grande do Sul, but frequently occurs in the northern Lagoa dos Patos. It is relatively common in the Chaco of Paraguay, especially in the northern Chaco where large numbers of individuals occur throughout the expanses of freshwater, so that this species is considered emblematic of the wetland avifauna of this region. Conversely, it has rarely been recorded in the pampas of northern Argentina in the southernmost part of its distribution; with an occasional handful of individuals at a time having been sighted during surveys throughout the 1990s in the Laguna Melincue Ramsar Site in the southern Santa Fe Province.

Its habitat largely comprises the lowland grassy wetlands of the Pantanal and the Chaco. It is found here foraging at marshes, swamps, lagoons, shallow lakes, flooded pastures, ponds and other moist ground; but also perches in tree branches near or above the water to roost. It has also been sighted in upland marshes, usually up to 600m in elevation; and at small remnant pools in desiccated lagoons and on dry grasslands. Further, this ibis commonly occurs near human habitation and other manmade features; including dams and seasonally-flooded rice fields. It is also a relatively common sight along the Transpantaneira Highway in the Pantanal of Mato Grosso. Finally, it has been recorded close to the east Brazilian coast in wet areas in the Lagoa do Peixe National Park on the peninsula separating Lagoa dos Patos from the Atlantic (Pereira & Poerschke, 2009); but probably avoids the saline and brackish waters.

Individuals are usually sedentary and can remain in a specific area all year round. They have however been reported to migrate on a local scale. Circumstantial evidence from the novel presence of individuals at Incachaca Lake in the Chapare Province of Bolivia suggests that this species may migrate between the geographically separated northern Bolivian and other South American populations, and may use Incachaca as a resting place en route. Since no subspecies have been noted for this species, the world population is probably kept genetically homogenous by short migrations of individuals between the two geographically separated subpopulations. However, it remains unknown whether this species has regular migration patterns. Incidentally, the species' discovery at Lake Incachaca was its first recorded occurrence in the cloud forest ecoregion and was also a new altitudinal record.

Unlike other ibis species, the plumbeous ibis does not form large intraspecific flocks. It is most often seen singly or in pairs, but is also more rarely seen in groups of up to six individuals. The larger groups appear to consist of two mates accompanied by their fledged juveniles.

== Ecology and behaviour ==
=== Feeding ===
This ibis's diet comprises aquatic invertebrates; snails, especially apple snails of the genus Pomacea; mussels; crabs; frogs; fish and eels. It has also been reported to eat snakes, lizards, skinks and terrestrial invertebrates; which is plausible given its occasional occurrence in dry grasslands. Despite this ibis's apparently generalist diet, it is found to specialise on molluscs in the Paraguay-Parana basin.

The plumbeous ibis often feeds solitarily or in pairs, but may assemble in loose flocks to forage in winter when food is scarcer. Individuals have also been found foraging together with white-faced ibises and jacanas. The plumbeous ibis's typical foraging strategy consists in walking slowly through shallow mud and water, probing fast and repeatedly with its bill in the water in search of prey. Its bill is sometimes completely submerged in the water and its aquatic foraging habits ecologically distinguishes it from the related, sympatric buff-necked ibis which preferentially forages in adjacent dry grassland; although the breeding biology of these two species is regarded to be similar.

Both parents feed the young by regurgitation. Chicks induce the parent to feed them by prodding their bills into the gap between the upper and lower mandibles of the parent's bill. Thereupon, the parent regurgitates food for the nestlings with head movements during which the young hang onto the parent with their bills and sway passively with such movements. With age, the juveniles become more independent in food acquisition as they begin to leave the nest, and are fed less frequently.

=== Breeding ===
Unlike many other ibises, the plumbeous ibis is a non-colonial breeder. Breeding occurs in sparsely wooded areas from March until mid-October. Nest building by both partners begins in March and takes about a month to complete. Nests are commonly constructed above or near to water on horizontal limbs of massive fig trees of Ficus species. or in the species Luehea paniculata. Some nests in Mato Grosso in Brazil have been found situated in trees above or near to farmsteads, which may further reflect this species' association with humans. The nest typically measures 25 cm in height and 50 cm in width and consists of a loose, disorderly constructed platform of dry branches or sticks, with a hollow about 20 cm deep lined with dry grass and leaves; therefore resembling that of the wood stork. Both partners contribute to building the nest, which takes about a month to complete and is situated 10-12m above the ground; although some nests built in large fig trees in forested areas in the Pantanal may lie up to 20m above the ground. The same nest may also be used by a pair over consecutive years.

Copulation between mates takes place in April, which is shortly preceded by a relatively simple courtship. During courtship, one individual (male or female) stands on the branch of a dead tree and utters its distinctive metallic-sounding call to summon its mate, which flies onto the branch to join its partner. Thereupon, both mates prod their bills into the tree bark before the male buries his bill in the female's plumage. The male subsequently steps onto the female's back to copulate.

A typical clutch consists of 2-3 eggs, which are pale greenish-grey and weigh 70-74g. Average egg dimensions have been reported as 68.6 x 44.9mm. Some nests have also been found to contain eggs together with young in various developmental stages; which suggests that this ibis may sometimes lay two consecutive clutches per year. The incubation period is 28 days and the young usually hatch in early September. In the chicks' first 10 days, they are constantly guarded by one of the parents. The two parents alternately guard the nest at night, and the bird returning to the nest signals the change of nest guarding duty with a short sequence of calls and an occasional display whereby both partners prod their bills into each other's neck feathers.

As the chicks age, parents attend the nest less regularly; and gradually leave the young alone for longer periods. Breeding pairs usually produce two surviving young, which fledge after 40–43 days of hatching, coinciding with the end of the dry season in the Pantanal. At fledging, the young may leave the nest and begin to venture further away with age, usually feeding in marshes near the nest. Parents have been noted to fly onto meadows adjacent to the tree containing the nest and utter monosyllabic calls that appear to function as an invitation for the young to follow the parent to adult feeding grounds. The young thenceforth feed with adults away from the nest and continue to use the nest-site tree for sleeping several weeks after fledging.

=== Threats and survival ===
The plumbeous ibis is prey for multiple nest predators. Although brooding parent birds are strongly aggressive toward intruders and can successfully deter small predators such as opossums, jays and vultures; they apparently lose to larger predators such as capuchin monkeys and great black hawks. For example, large groups of capuchins have been observed to attack plumbeous ibis nests, whereby some assailants violently force the parent bird out of the nest while others steal the eggs. Brooding adults of this species also show marked aggression toward human intruders. If approached by a human, this ibis screams loudly; whereby it lowers its body, bristles its feathers and jabs its bill at the intruder. Further, juveniles have been noted to defend themselves with forward lunges of the bill. These defensive behaviours in this ibis reflect the bird's high predation risk and hence the adaptive value of such behaviours for survival.

Like many other sympatric wading birds, it is likely threatened by habitat loss through burning and logging of nesting trees, construction and operation of hydroelectric dams in the Pantanal, and expansion of mining and agriculture. This bird is however not persecuted directly.

The plumbeous ibis's apparent association with humans may render it particularly vulnerable to the effects of pesticides from agriculture, especially in the Taquari Basin. Additionally, pesticides together with physical disturbance to soil through agricultural machinery may reduce local availability of macroinvertebrate prey to this species (Stenert et al. 2009). One study in south Brazil has shown the plumbeous ibis to be more abundant in flooded rice fields during the post-harvest season compared to pre-harvest. This may be due to the cessation of use of agrochemicals and machinery after harvest, leading to greater macroinvertebrate richness and density; so that there is greater abundance of macroinvertebrate prey for the ibis to feed on. Nevertheless, this bird together with many other species still appears to be more abundant in natural wetlands than in flooded farmland. Therefore, a proposed conservation strategy for this species in the face of agricultural expansion that may also benefit other sympatric wading birds has been to retain expanses of natural wetland within the rice cultivation ecosystem.

== Relationship with humans ==
This species is not typically hunted because it is difficult to kill and skin owing to resistance it puts up in response to being captured, and also emits an unpleasantly musty odour if caught. Nevertheless, it has been kept in captivity several times. For example, Berlin Zoo received three plumbeous ibises from San Carlos Zoo, Uruguay, in 1987. More recently, the plumbeous ibis has been kept in many Brazilian zoos; with one chick having successfully hatched at Brasilia Zoo in 1992.

== Status ==
The plumbeous ibis has been evaluated by the IUCN as Least Concern since 2004 because this species does not reach the thresholds for Vulnerable under the range size and population trend criteria. The world population has been estimated at 50,000 – 100,000 individuals. However, further information on the plumbeous ibis's biology is required for more successful conservation of the species, and hence safeguard it against large potential future population declines.
