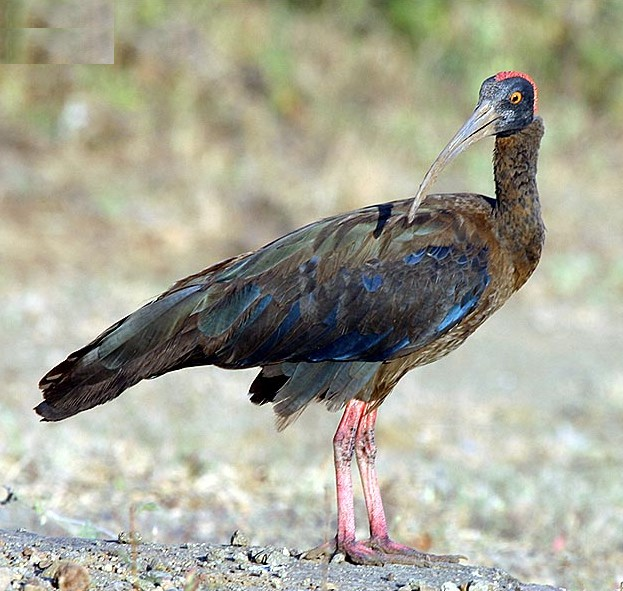
- Pseudibis papillosa

Scientific classification
- Kingdom: Animalia
- Phylum: Chordata
- Class: Aves
- Order: Pelecaniformes
- Family: Threskiornithidae
- Subfamily: Threskiornithinae
- Genus: Pseudibis; Hodgson, 1844

Type species
- Ibis papillosa Temminck, 1824

Species
- Pseudibis papillosa; Pseudibis davisoni; Pseudibis gigantea

= Pseudibis =

Genus of birds

The bird genus Pseudibis consists of three South-East Asian species in the ibis subfamily, Threskiornithinae.

Genus Pseudibis

Image	Scientific name	Common name	Distribution
	Pseudibis papillosa	Red-naped ibis	Indian Subcontinent
	Pseudibis davisoni	White-shouldered ibis	Southeast Asia from Myanmar to Thailand, Malaysia, Cambodia, Laos, Vietnam and north into Yunnan in China
	Pseudibis gigantea	Giant Ibis	Northern Cambodia, with a few birds surviving in extreme southern Laos

The white-shouldered ibis is critically endangered.
