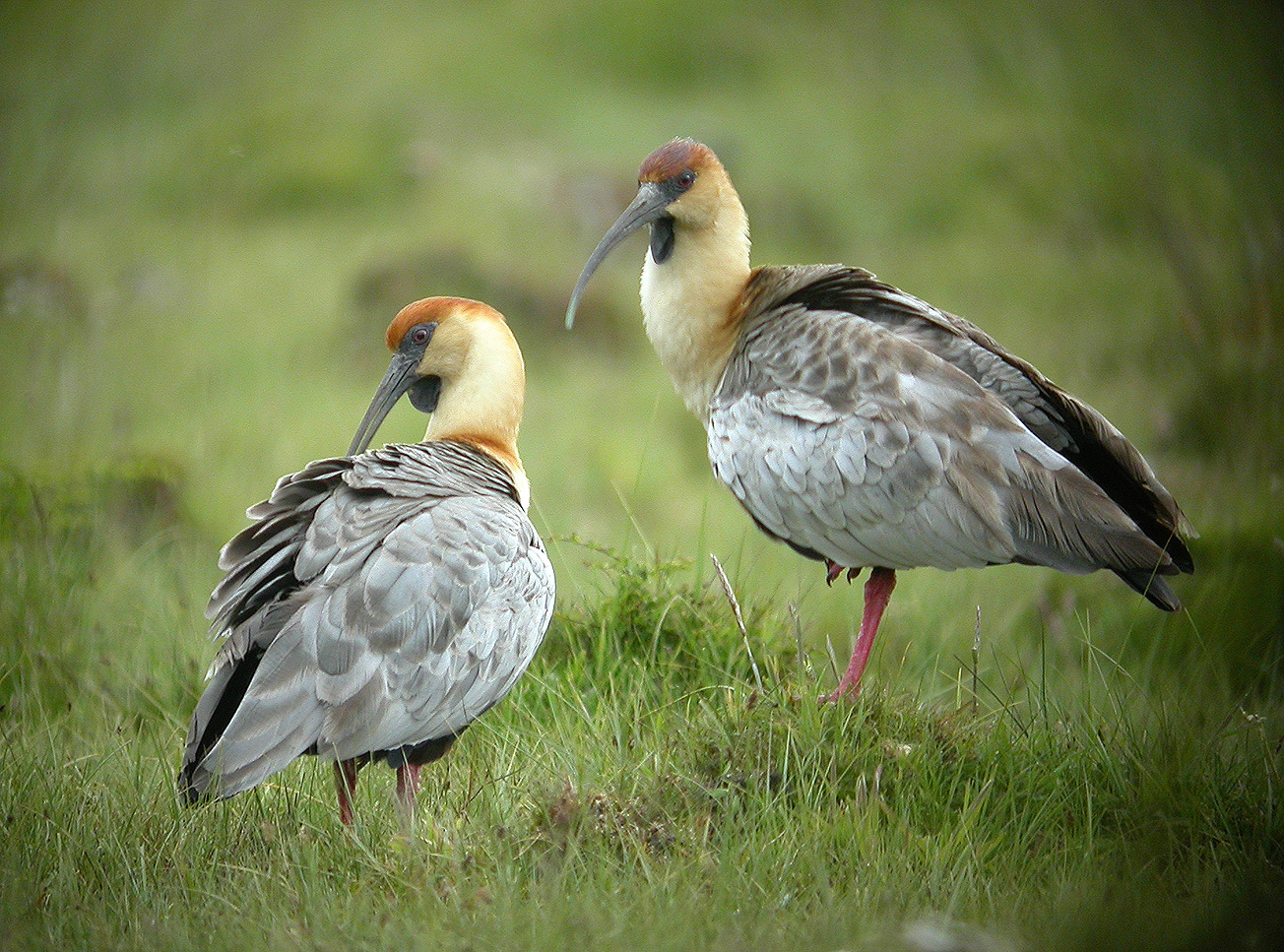
- Black-faced ibis.

Scientific classification
- Kingdom: Animalia
- Phylum: Chordata
- Class: Aves
- Order: Pelecaniformes
- Family: Threskiornithidae
- Subfamily: Threskiornithinae
- Genus: Theristicus; Wagler, 1832

Type species
- Tantalus melanopis Gmelin, 1789

= Theristicus =

Genus of birds

Theristicus is a genus of birds in the family Threskiornithidae. They are found in open, grassy habitats in South America. All have a long, decurved dark bill, relatively short reddish legs that do not extend beyond the tail in flight (unlike e.g. Eudocimus and Plegadis), and the back is grey.

== Taxonomy ==
The genus Theristicus was erected by the German naturalist Johann Georg Wagler in 1832 with the black-faced ibis as the type species. The name is from the Ancient Greek theristikos meaning "of reaping". The genus contains four species.

Genus Theristicus – Wagler, 1832 – four species
Common name	Scientific name and subspecies	Range	Size and ecology	IUCN status and estimated population
Plumbeous ibis	Theristicus caerulescens (Vieillot, 1817)	south-western Brazil, especially in southern Mato Grosso and Rio Grande do Sul; Paraguay, especially in the Chaco and in the Paraguayan section of the Parana Basin; Uruguay; north-eastern Argentina and northern and eastern Bolivia	Size: Habitat: Diet:	LC
Buff-necked ibis	Theristicus caudatus (Boddaert, 1783) Two subspecies: T. c. caudatus (Boddaert, 1783); T. c. hyperorius Todd, 1948	northern and central South America in Colombia, Venezuela, the Guianas and Brazil	Size: Habitat: Diet:	LC
Black-faced ibis	Theristicus melanopis von Berlepsch & Stolzmann, 1894	central Argentina and Chile	Size: Habitat: Diet:	LC
Andean ibis	Theristicus branickii (Gmelin, 1789)	western South America	Size: Habitat: Diet:	NT
