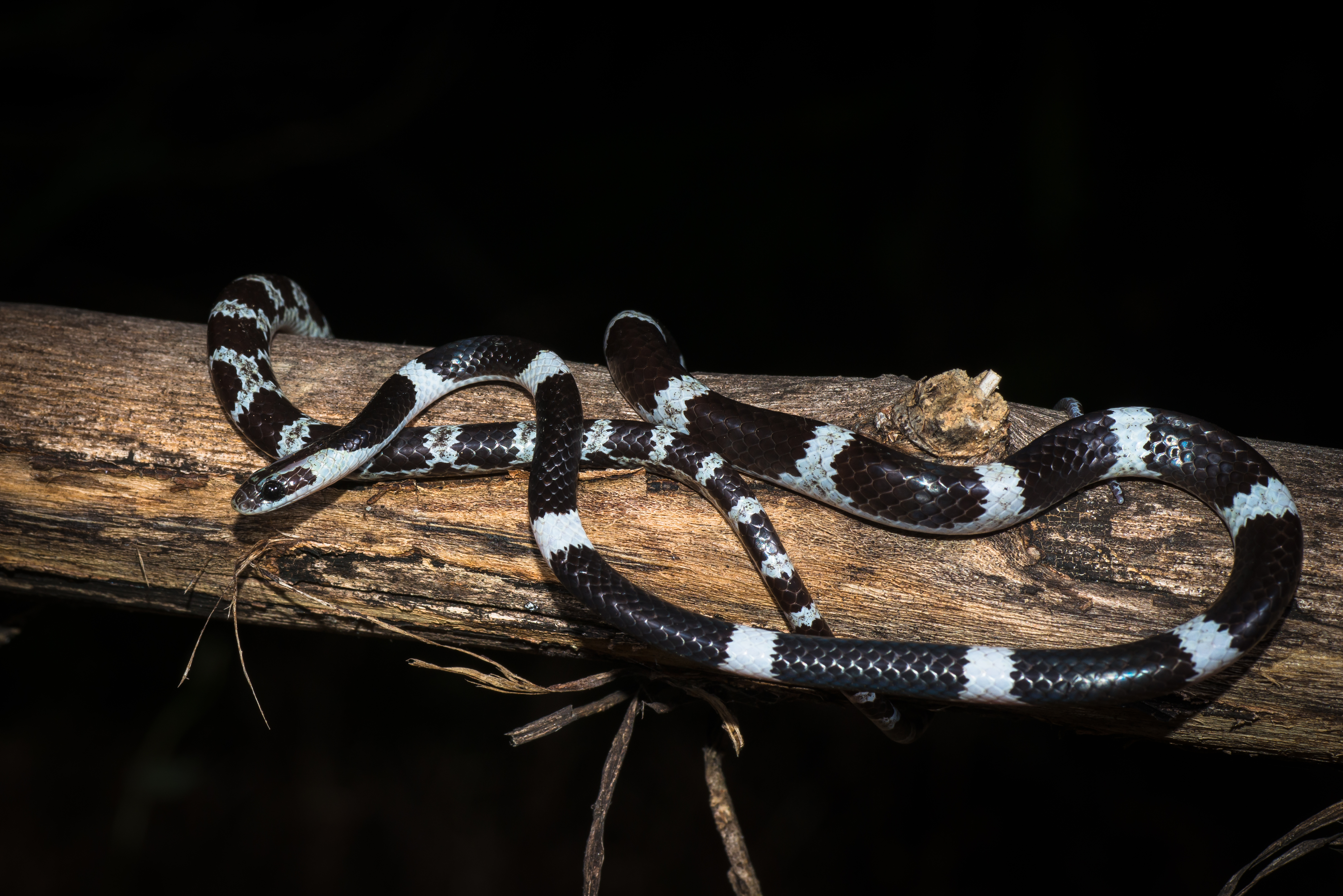
- from Kaeng Krachan National Park

Conservation status
- Least Concern (IUCN 3.1)

Scientific classification
- Kingdom: Animalia
- Phylum: Chordata
- Class: Reptilia
- Order: Squamata
- Suborder: Serpentes
- Family: Colubridae
- Genus: Lycodon
- Species: L. davisonii

Binomial name
- Lycodon davisonii (Blanford, 1878)

Synonyms
- Ulupe davisoni Blanford, 1878; Hydrophobus davisonii — Boulenger, 1890; Dryocalamus davisonii — Boulenger, 1893; Dryocalamus davisoni — M.A. Smith, 1943; Dryocalamus davisonii — Cox et al., 1998; Dryocalamus davisoni — Chan-ard et al., 1999; Dryocalamus davisonii — V.S. Nguyen et al., 2009; Lycodon davisonii — Figueroa et al., 2016

= Blanford's bridle snake =

Species of snake

Blanford's bridle snake (Lycodon davisonii), also known commonly as Blanford's bridal snake, is a species of harmless snake in the family Colubridae. The species is endemic to Asia. Blanford's bridle snake is so named because its slim body resembles the bridle used to control horses. It is named Blanford's bridle snake after William Thomas Blanford, the English naturalist who originally described the snake in 1878.

== Geographic range ==
L. davisonii is found in Cambodia, southern China, Laos, Myanmar, Thailand, and Vietnam.

== Etymology ==
The specific name, davisonii, is in honor of British ornithologist William Ruxton Davison.

== Habitat ==
The preferred natural habitat of L. davisonii is forest, at altitudes from sea level to 600 m (2,000 ft).

== Behavior ==
L. davisonii is terrestrial, semiarboreal, and nocturnal.

== Diet ==
L. davisonii preys upon geckos and other small vertebrates.

== Reproduction ==
L. davisonii is oviparous.
