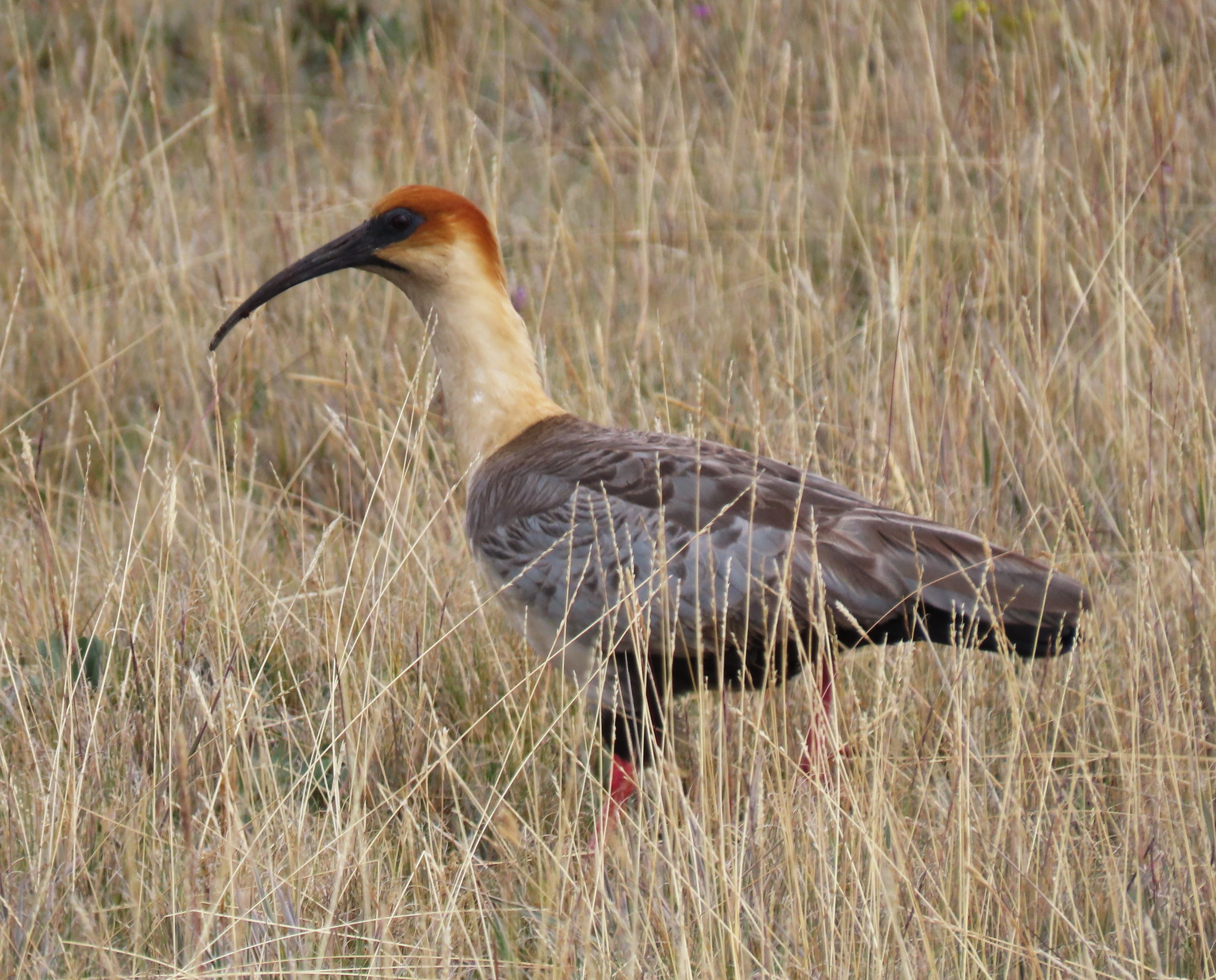

Conservation status
- Near Threatened (IUCN 3.1)

Scientific classification
- Kingdom: Animalia
- Phylum: Chordata
- Class: Aves
- Order: Pelecaniformes
- Family: Threskiornithidae
- Genus: Theristicus
- Species: T. branickii

Binomial name
- Theristicus branickii von Berlepsch & Stolzmann, 1894

Synonyms
- Theristicus melanopis branickii

= Andean ibis =

Species of bird

The Andean ibis (Theristicus branickii) is a species of bird in the family Threskiornithidae. It is found in grassland and fields in western South America. This species was considered a subspecies of the black-faced ibis, and some taxonomic authorities (including the American Ornithological Society) still consider it so.

== Description ==
It has a total length of approximately 75 centimetres (30 in). The head, neck and lower chest are buffish, the crown and nape are cinnamon, the upperparts and (often incomplete) chest-band are grey, the belly and flight feathers are black, and the wing-coverts are whitish (though not contrasting strongly with the grey upperparts). The bill, throat-wattle and bare skin around the eyes are blackish and the legs are red. The throat-wattle is smaller, the bill is shorter, the wing-coverts are greyer, the lower chest is paler and the cinnamon on the crown and nape is brighter and more extensive when compared to the black-faced ibis.

== Distribution and status ==
The Andean ibis is restricted to altitudes of 3,000 to 5,000 metres (9,800 to 16,400 ft) in the Andean highlands of Bolivia, Peru and Ecuador. It is generally uncommon, and formerly also occurred in Lauca in far northern Chile.
