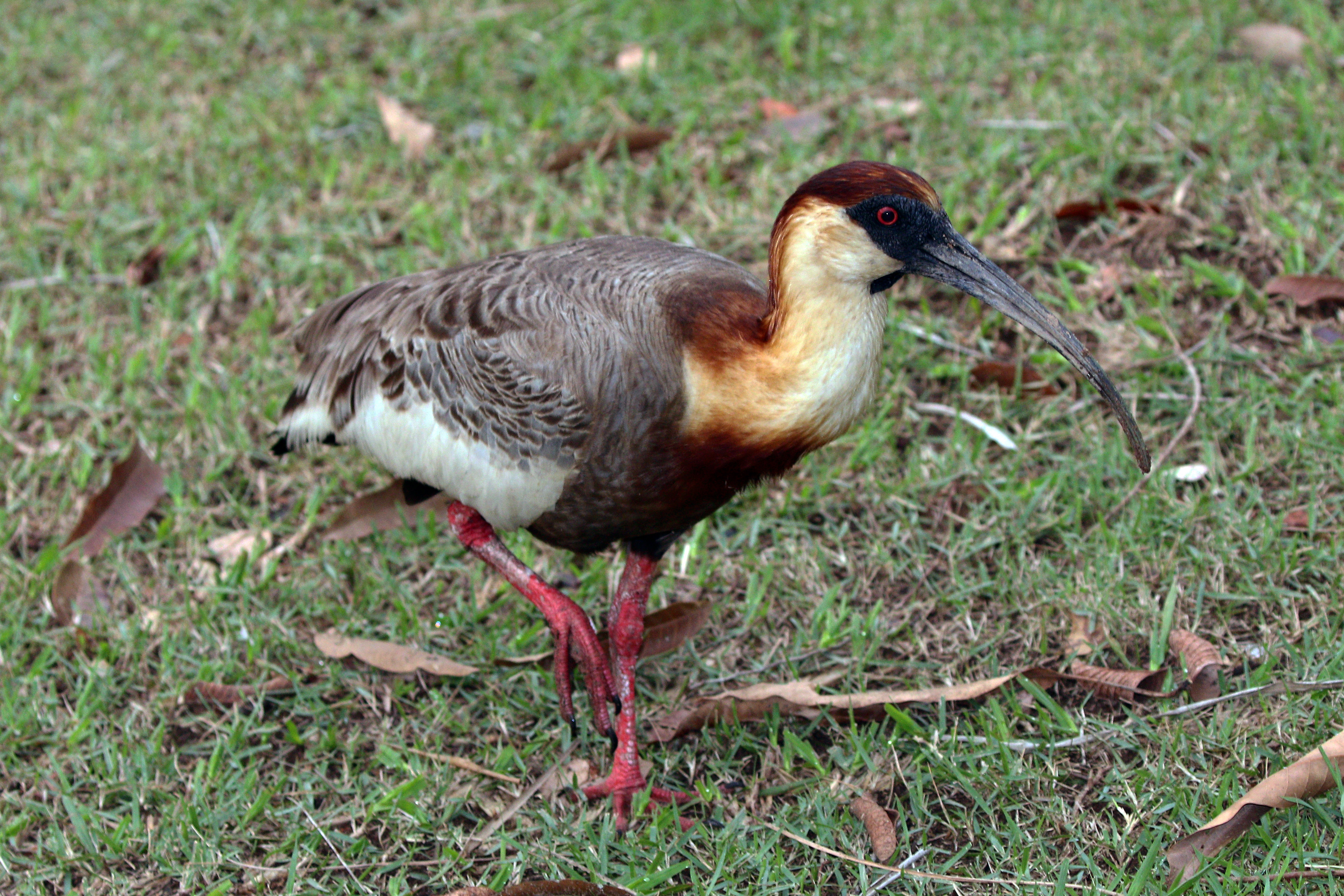
- in Pantanal, Brazil

Conservation status
- Least Concern (IUCN 3.1)

Scientific classification
- Kingdom: Animalia
- Phylum: Chordata
- Class: Aves
- Order: Pelecaniformes
- Family: Threskiornithidae
- Genus: Theristicus
- Species: T. caudatus

Binomial name
- Theristicus caudatus (Boddaert, 1783)

= Buff-necked ibis =

Species of bird

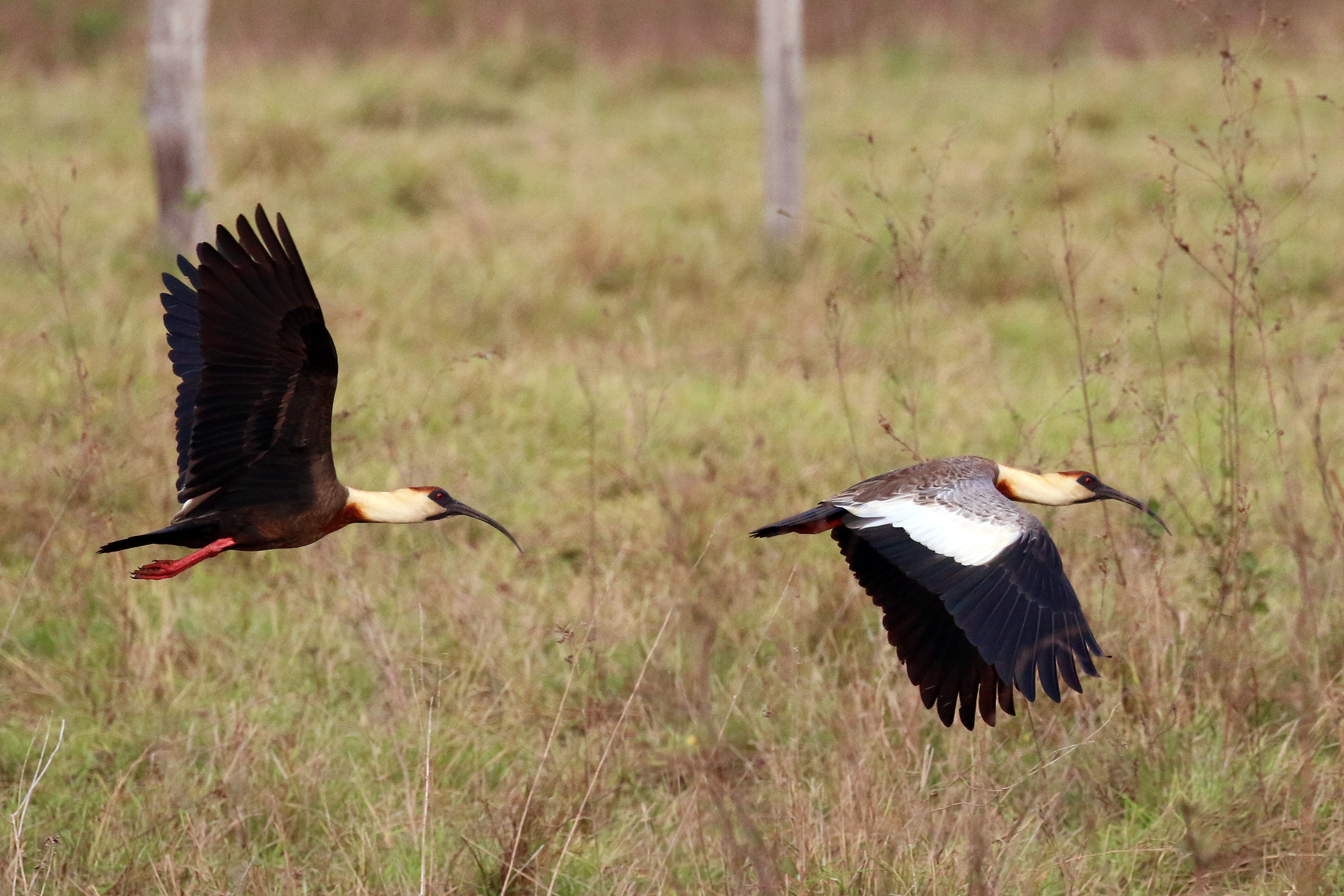
In flight, Pantanal, Brazil (composite image)

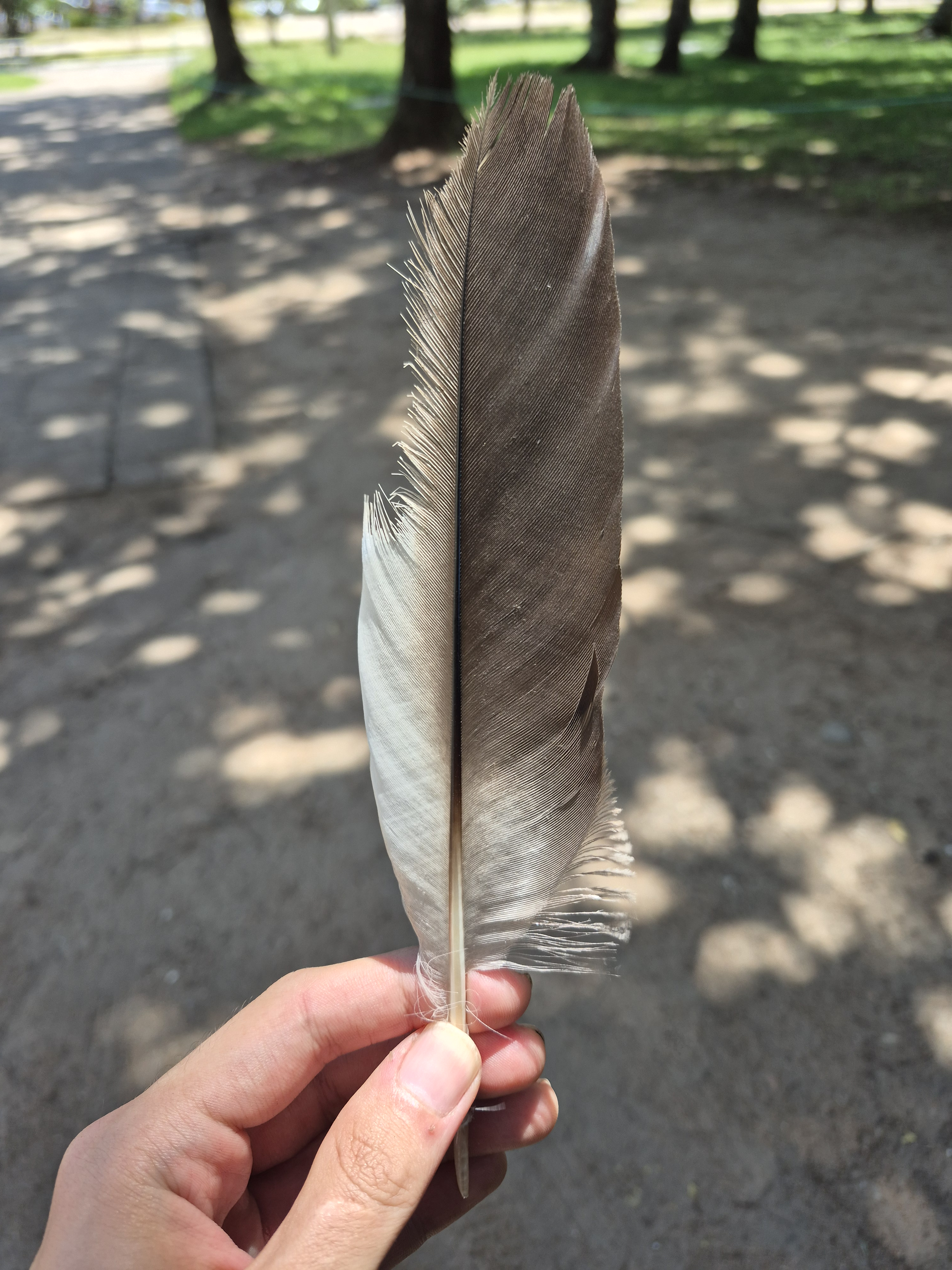
Feather in southern Brazil

The buff-necked ibis (Theristicus caudatus), also known as the white-throated ibis, is a fairly large ibis found widely in open habitats of eastern and northern South America. It formerly included the similar black-faced ibis as a subspecies, but that species is almost entirely restricted to colder parts of South America, has a buff (not dark grey) lower chest, and lacks the contrasting large white wing-patches.

== Taxonomy ==
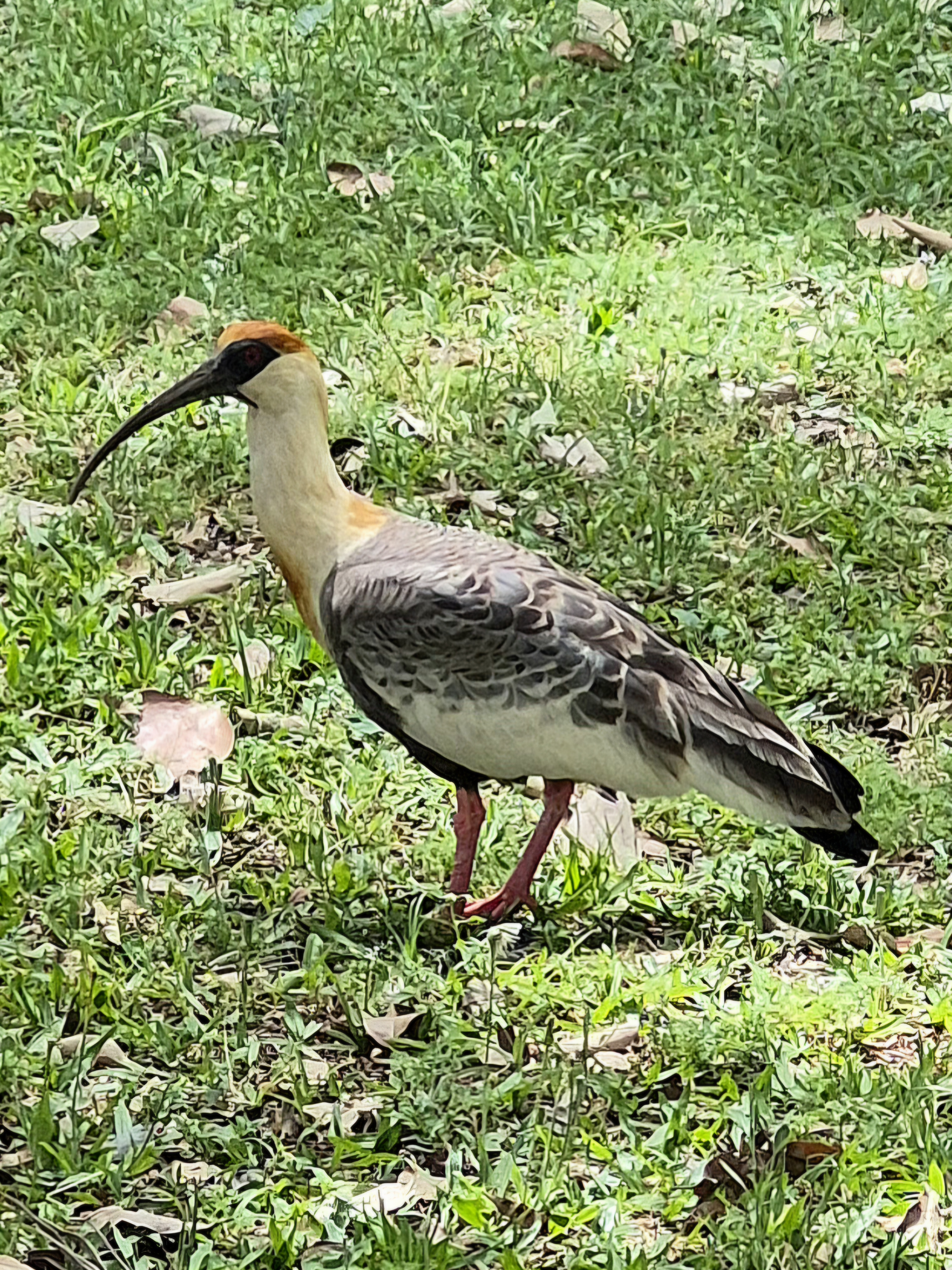
Another variety, in southern Brazil

The buff-necked ibis was described by the French polymath Georges-Louis Leclerc, Comte de Buffon in 1781 in his Histoire Naturelle des Oiseaux based on a specimen collected in Cayenne, French Guiana. The bird was also illustrated in a hand-coloured plate engraved by François-Nicolas Martinet in the Planches Enluminées D'Histoire Naturelle which was produced under the supervision of Edme-Louis Daubenton to accompany Buffon's text. Neither the plate caption nor Buffon's description included a scientific name but in 1783 the Dutch naturalist Pieter Boddaert coined the binomial name Scolopax caudatus in his catalogue of the Planches Enluminées. The buff-necked ibis is now placed in the genus Theristicus that was erected by the German naturalist Johann Georg Wagler in 1832. The name of the genus is from the Ancient Greek theristikos meaning "of reaping"; the specific epithet is from the Latin caudatus meaning "tailed".

Two subspecies are recognised:

- T. c. caudatus (Boddaert, 1783) – northern South America to Mato Grosso in southwest Brazil
- T. c. hyperorius Todd, 1948 – east Bolivia to south Brazil and north Argentina

== Description ==
It has a total length of approximately 75 centimetres (30 in). The neck is buffish, the upperparts are grey, the belly and flight feathers are black, and there is a large white patch in the wings. In flight, where the relatively short legs do not extend beyond the tail (unlike e.g. Eudocimus and Plegadis), the white patch forms a broad white band on the upperwing that separates the black remiges and the grey lesser wing-coverts. The bill and bare skin around the eyes are blackish and the legs are red.

== Habitat and status ==
The buff-necked ibis lives in a wide range of open habitats, including fields, marshes, savanna and grassland. There are two primary populations; the nominate subspecies is found across northern and central South America in Colombia, Venezuela, the Guianas and Brazil, while the very similar subspecies hyperorius is found in south-central South America in southern Brazil, eastern and northern Bolivia, Paraguay, Uruguay, and northern Argentina. It is almost entirely restricted to tropical and warmer subtropical lowlands, but very locally it extends into highlands (though never as high as the Andean ibis). It is almost entirely resident, although local movements may occur. It has been recorded as an accidental visitor in Panama.

With a large range and an estimated population of 25,000 to 100,000, the buff-necked ibis is evaluated as Least Concern on the IUCN Red List of Threatened Species.

== Behavior ==
Its diet consists mainly of insects, spiders, frogs, reptiles, snails, invertebrates and small mammals found in soft soils. The female usually lays two to four eggs in a platform nest, made from twigs and branches, in a tree.
