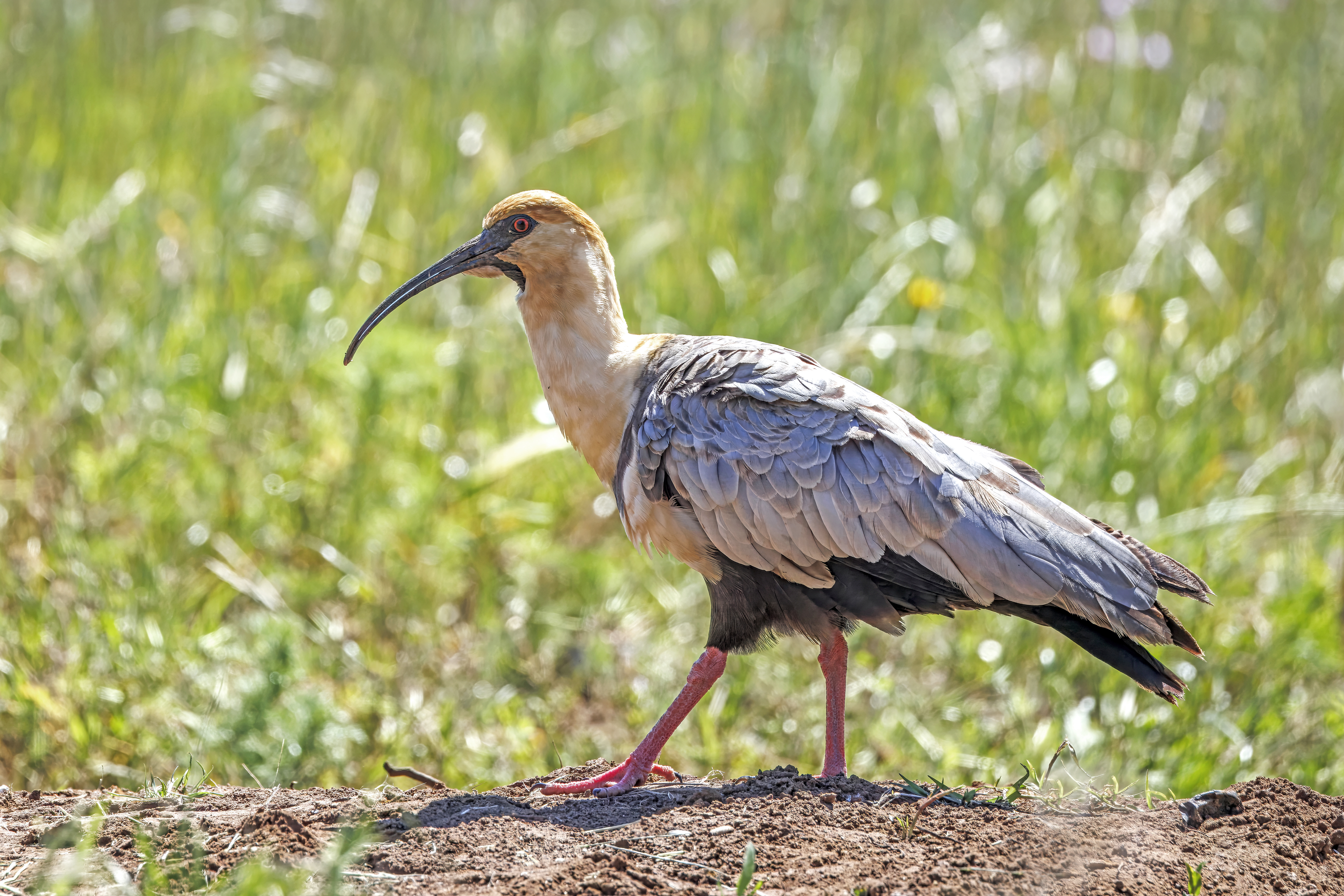
- in Chile

Conservation status
- Least Concern (IUCN 3.1)

Scientific classification
- Kingdom: Animalia
- Phylum: Chordata
- Class: Aves
- Order: Pelecaniformes
- Family: Threskiornithidae
- Genus: Theristicus
- Species: T. melanopis

Binomial name
- Theristicus melanopis (Gmelin, 1789)
- Nonbreeding Yearound Breeding

Synonyms
- Tantalus melanopis (protonym)

= Black-faced ibis =

Species of bird

The black-faced ibis (Theristicus melanopis) is a species of bird in the family Threskiornithidae. It is found in grassland and fields in southern and western South America. It has been included as a subspecies of the similar buff-necked ibis, but today all major authorities accept the split. The black-faced ibis also includes the Andean ibis (T. branickii) as a subspecies. Some taxonomic authorities (including the American Ornithological Society) still do so.

== Taxonomy ==
The black-faced ibis was formally described in 1789 by the German naturalist Johann Friedrich Gmelin in his revised and expanded edition of Carl Linnaeus's Systema Naturae. He placed it in the genus Tantalus and coined the binomial name Tantalus melanopsis. Gmelin based his description on the "black-faced ibis" that had been described and illustrated in 1785 by the English ornithologist John Lathamin his book A General Synopsis of Birds. Latham had based his account on a specimen in the Leverian Museum and on drawings in the collection of the naturalist Joseph Banks. Georg Forster mentioned seeing these birds in January 1775 on "New Year's Island" (now Isla Observatorio) near Staten Island in his account of James Cook's second yoyage to the Pacific. The black-faced ibis is now one of four South American ibises placed in the genus Theristicus that was introduced by the German naturalist Johann Georg Wagler in 1832. The genus name is from the Ancient Greek theristikos meaning "of reaping". The specific epithet melanopis combines the Greek melas meaning "black" with -ōpis meaning "faced". The species is monotypic: no subspecies are recognised.

== Description ==
It has a total length of approximately 75 centimetres (30 in). The head, neck and lower chest are buffish, the crown and nape are cinnamon, the upperparts and (often incomplete) chest-band are grey, the belly and flight feathers are black, and the wing-coverts are whitish (though not contrasting strongly with the grey upperparts). The bill, throat-wattle and bare skin around the eyes are blackish and the legs are red.

The similar buff-necked ibis is almost entirely restricted to warm regions, has contrasting large white wing-patches, a dark grey (not buff) lower chest, and its throat-wattle is smaller than in the black-faced ibis.

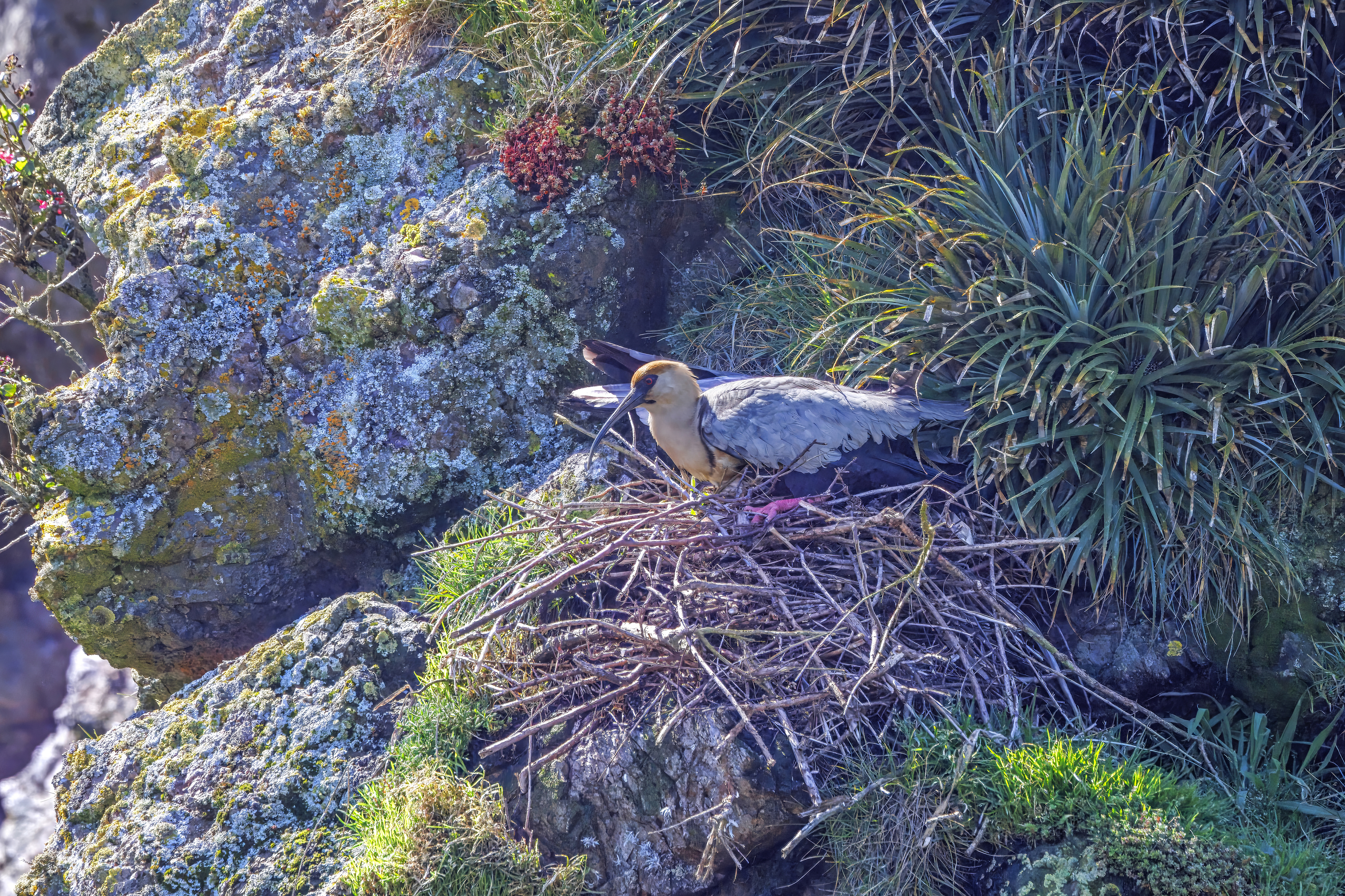
on nest

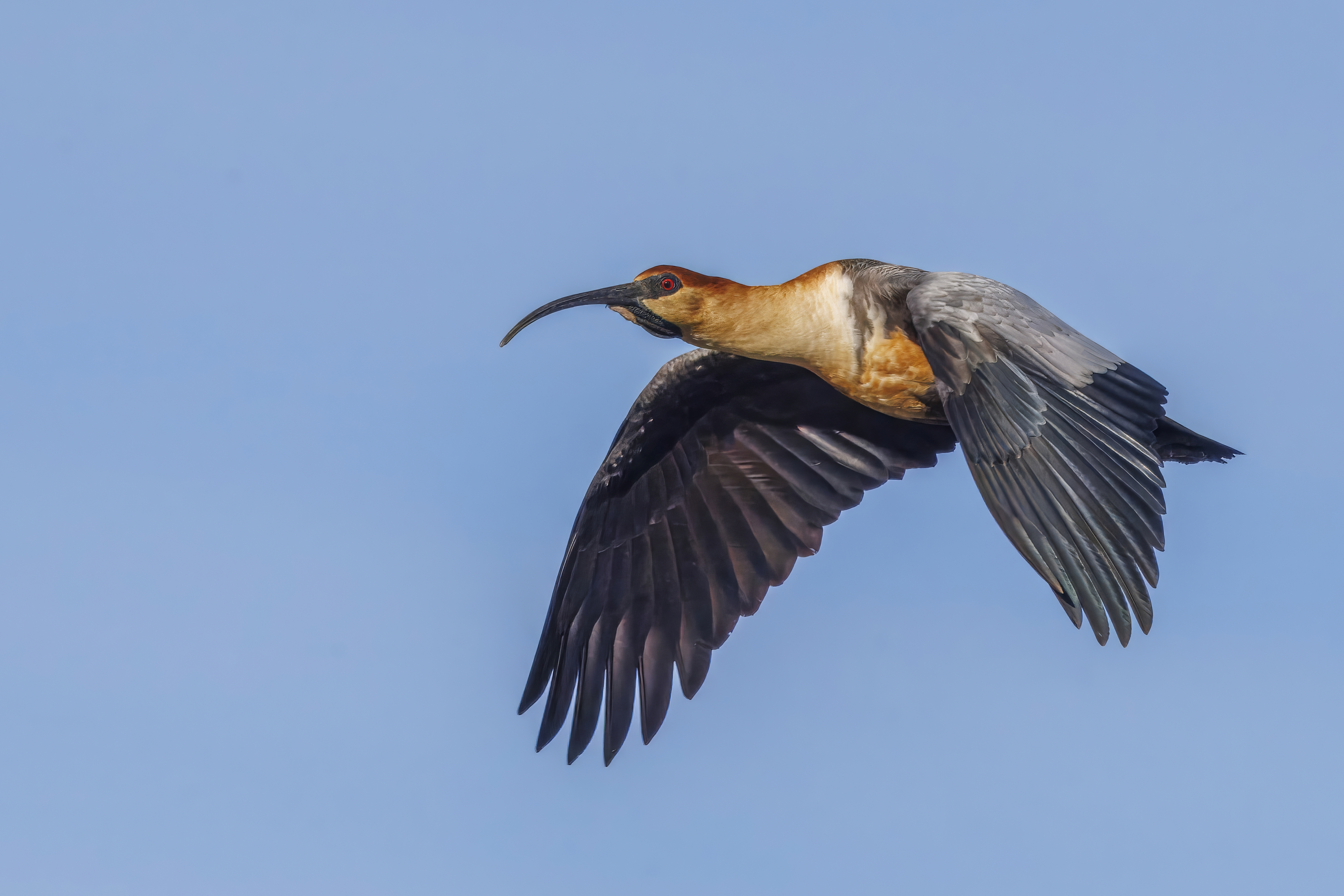

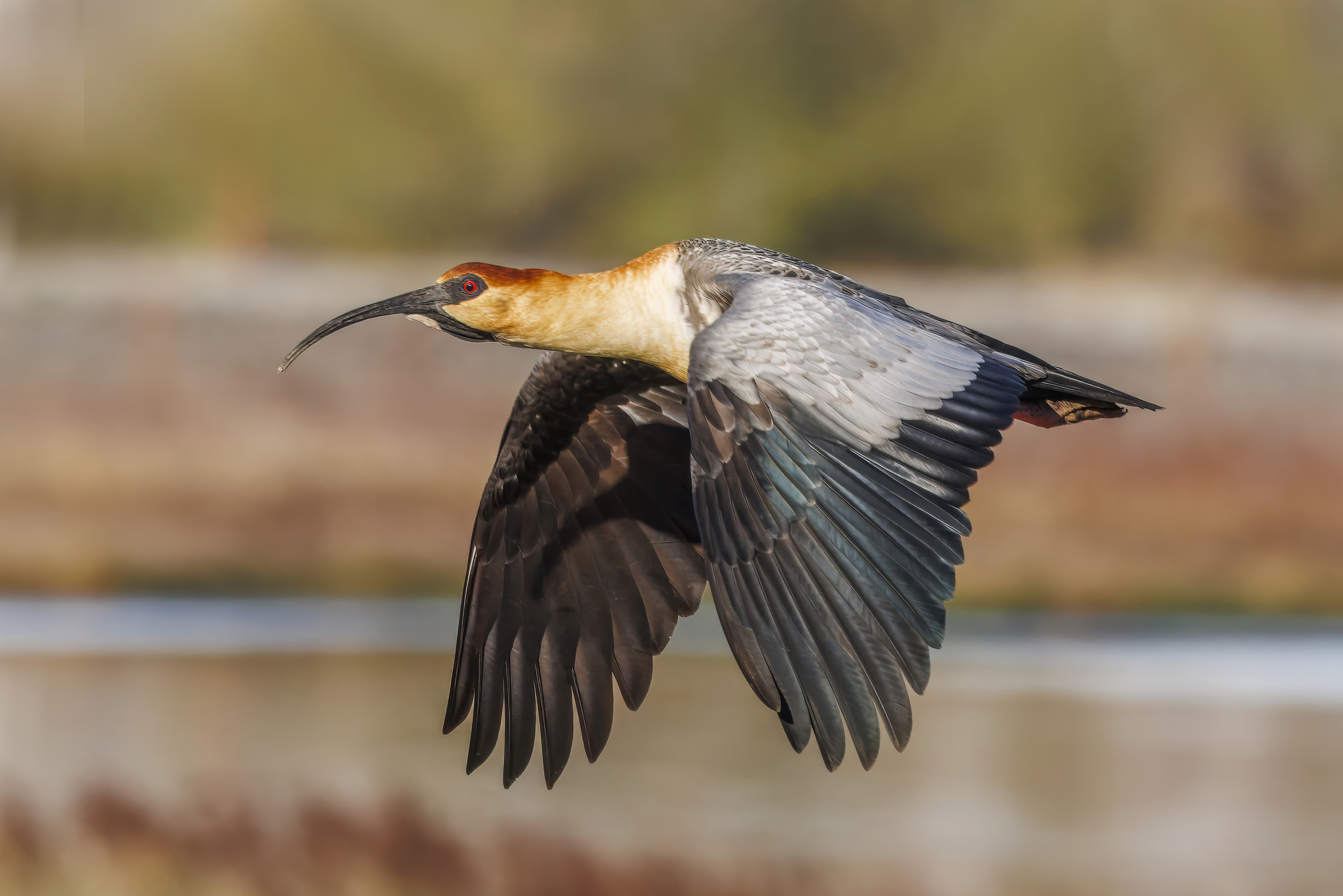

== Distribution and status ==
The black-faced ibis is mainly found in southern South America, ranging throughout most of southern and central Argentina and Chile, where it occurs from sea-level to an altitude of approximately 2,500 metres (8,200 ft). It also occurs very locally in coastal Peru. While it remains fairly common in Argentina and Chile, this species has now been almost entirely extirpated from the Peruvian part of its range.

Overall the species is not threatened, and consequently assigned Least Concern by the IUCN.
