= Sea lion =

Sea lion Temporal range: Late Oligocene – Present
- Steller sea lions (Eumetopias jubatus monteriensis) females

Scientific classification (obsolete)
- Kingdom: Animalia
- Phylum: Chordata
- Class: Mammalia
- Order: Carnivora
- Parvorder: Pinnipedia
- Family: Otariidae
- Subfamily: Otariinae; Gray 1825

Genera
- Eumetopias; Neophoca; Otaria; Phocarctos; Zalophus

Cladistically included but traditionally excluded taxa
- Arctocephalus

Subfamily of aquatic mammals

Sea lions are pinnipeds characterized by external ear flaps, long foreflippers, the ability to walk on all fours, short and thick hair, and a big chest and belly. Together with the fur seals, they make up the family Otariidae, eared seals. The sea lions have six extant and one extinct species (the Japanese sea lion) in five genera. Their range extends from the subarctic to tropical waters of the global ocean in both the Northern and Southern hemispheres, with the notable exception of the northern Atlantic Ocean.

Sea lions have an average lifespan of 20–30 years. A male California sea lion weighs on average about 300 kg (660 lb) and is about 2.4 m (8 ft) long, while the female sea lion weighs 100 kg (220 lb) and is 1.8 m (6 ft) long. The largest sea lions are Steller sea lions, which can weigh 1,000 kg (2,200 lb) and grow to a length of 3.0 m (10 ft). Sea lions consume large quantities of food at a time and are known to eat about 5–8% of their body weight (about 6.8–15.9 kg (15–35 lb)) at a single feeding. Sea lions can move around 16 knots (30 km/h; 18 mph) in water and at their fastest they can reach a speed of about 30 knots (56 km/h; 35 mph). Three species, the Australian sea lion, the Galápagos sea lion and the New Zealand sea lion, are listed as endangered.

== Taxonomy ==
Sea lions are related to walruses and seals. Together with the fur seals, they constitute the family Otariidae, collectively known as eared seals. Until recently, sea lions were grouped under a single subfamily called Otariinae, whereas fur seals were grouped in the subfamily Arcocephalinae. This division was based on the most prominent common feature shared by the fur seals and absent in the sea lions, namely the dense underfur characteristic of the former. Recent genetic evidence, suggests Callorhinus, the genus of the northern fur seal, is more closely related to some sea lion species than to the other fur seal genus, Arctocephalus. Therefore, the fur seal/sea lion subfamily distinction has been eliminated from many taxonomies.

Nonetheless, all fur seals have certain features in common: the fur, generally smaller sizes, farther and longer foraging trips, smaller and more abundant prey items, and greater sexual dimorphism. All sea lions have certain features in common, in particular their coarse, short fur, greater bulk, and larger prey than fur seals. For these reasons, the distinction remains useful. The family Otariidae (Order Carnivora) contains the 15 extant species of fur seals and sea lions. Traditional classification of the family into the subfamilies Arctocephalinae (fur seals) and Otariinae (sea lions) is not supported, with the fur seal Callorhinus ursinus having a basal relationship relative to the rest of the family. This is consistent with the fossil record which suggests that this genus diverged from the line leading to the remaining fur seals and sea lions about 6 million years ago (mya). Similar genetic divergences between the sea lion clades as well as between the major Arctocephalus fur seal clades, suggest that these groups underwent periods of rapid radiation at about the time they diverged from each other. The phylogenetic relationships within the family and the genetic distances among some taxa highlight inconsistencies in the current taxonomic classification of the family.

Arctocephalus is characterized by ancestral character states such as dense underfur and the presence of double rooted cheek teeth and is thus thought to represent the most "primitive" line. It was from this basal line that both the sea lions and the remaining fur seal genus, Callorhinus, are thought to have diverged. The fossil record from the western coast of North America presents evidence for the divergence of Callorhinus about 6 mya, whereas fossils in both California and Japan suggest that sea lions did not diverge until years later.

- Suborder Caniformia
  - Family Otariidae
    - Subfamily Arctocephalinae
      - Genus Arctocephalus (southern fur seal; eight species)
      - Genus Callorhinus (northern fur seal; one species)
    - Subfamily Otariinae
      - Genus Eumetopias
        - Steller's sea lion, E. jubatus
      - Genus Neophoca
        - Australian sea lion, N. cinerea
      - Genus Otaria
        - South American sea lion, O. flavescens
        - Otaria josefinae
      - Genus Phocarctos
        - New Zealand sea lion or Hooker's sea lion, P. hookeri
      - Genus Zalophus
        - California sea lion, Z. californianus
        - Japanese sea lion, Z. japonicus – extinct (1950s)
        - Galapagos sea lion, Z. wollebaeki
  - Family Phocidae: true seals
  - Family Odobenidae: walrus

== Physiology ==
=== Diving adaptations ===
There are many components that make up sea lion physiology and these processes control aspects of their behavior. Physiology dictates thermoregulation, osmoregulation, reproduction, metabolic rate, and many other aspects of sea lion ecology including but not limited to their ability to dive to great depths. The sea lions' bodies control heart rate, gas exchange, digestion rate, and blood flow to allow individuals to dive for a long period of time and prevent side effects of high pressure at depth. With the use of vascular adaptation, blubber as well as their dense fur, Sea lions are able to regulate their body temperatures. Blood flow to extremities can be adjusted depending on the climate when it's cold and dissipates heat when warm. They use behavioral strategies, maintaining thermal balance by moving onto land. Sea lions are able to adapt because of this in tropical and subarctic regions.

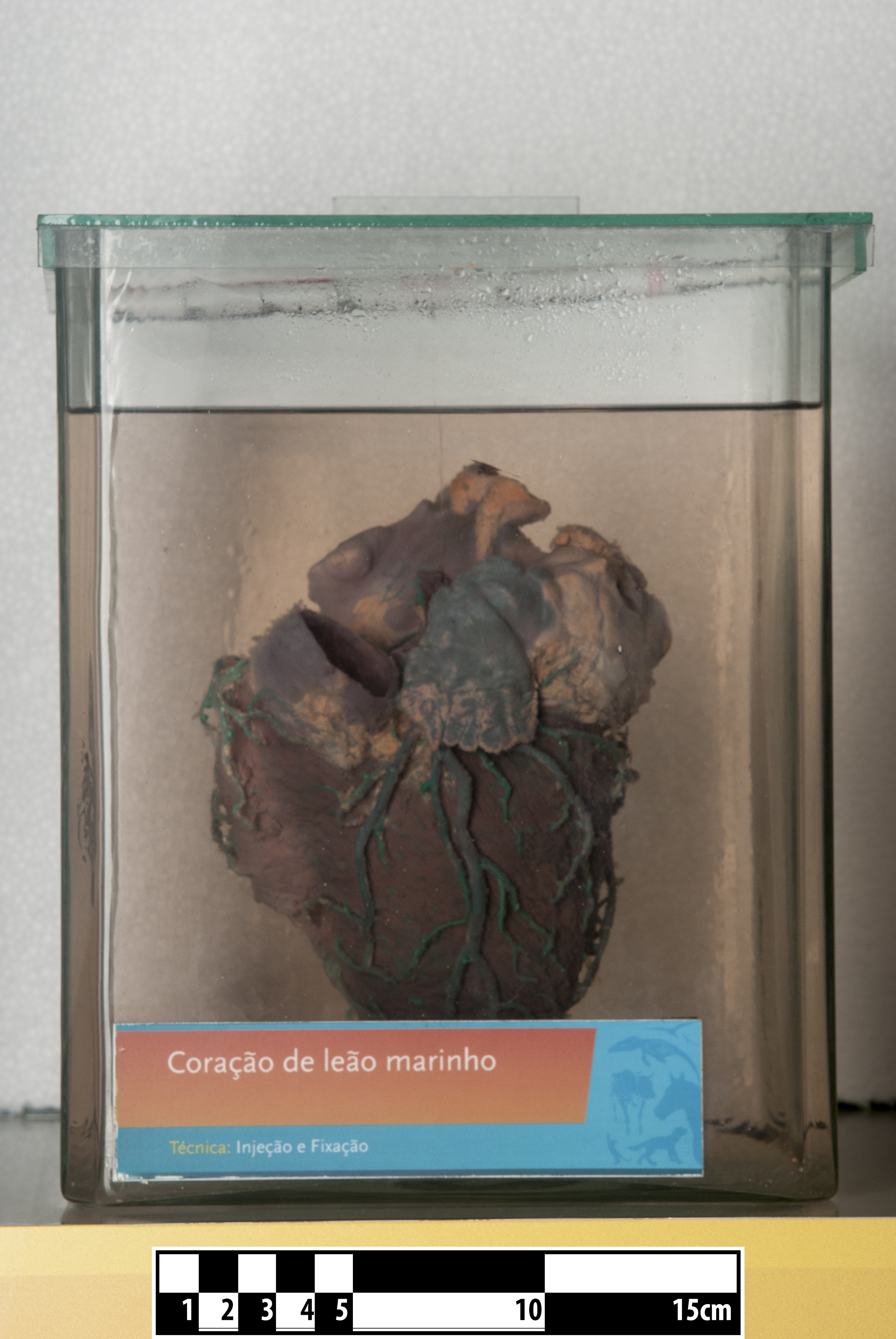
Sea lion heart

The high pressures associated with deep dives cause gases such as nitrogen to build up in tissues which are then released upon surfacing, possibly causing death. One of the ways sea lions deal with the extreme pressures is by limiting the amount of gas exchange that occurs when diving. The sea lion allows the alveoli to be compressed by the increasing water pressure thus forcing the surface air into cartilage lined airway just before the gas exchange surface. This process prevents any further oxygen exchange to the blood for muscles, requiring all muscles to be loaded with enough oxygen to last the duration of the dive. However, this shunt reduces the amount of compressed gases from entering tissues therefore reducing the risk of decompression sickness.

The collapse of alveoli does not allow for any oxygen storage in the lungs, however. This means that sea lions must mitigate oxygen use in order to extend their dives. Oxygen availability is prolonged by the physiological control of heart rate in sea lions. By reducing heart rate to well below surface rates, oxygen is saved by reducing gas exchange as well as reducing the energy required for a high heart rate. Bradycardia is a control mechanism to allow a switch from pulmonary oxygen to oxygen stored in the muscles which is needed when the sea lions are diving to depth. Another way sea lions mitigate the oxygen obtained at the surface in dives is to reduce digestion rate. Digestion requires metabolic activity and therefore energy and oxygen are consumed during this process; however, sea lions can limit digestion rate and decrease it by at least 54%. This reduction in digestion results in a proportional reduction in oxygen use in the stomach and therefore a correlated oxygen supply for diving. Digestion rate in these sea lions increases back to normal rates immediately upon resurfacing. Their metabolism is used for optimal energy when diving or when swimming. California sea lions, studies show that their locomotion is energy efficient. Reduction in drag when swimming and good propulsion in the water from their body shape.

Oxygen depletion limits dive duration, but carbon dioxide (CO_{2}) build-up also plays a role in the dive capabilities of many marine mammals. After a sea lion returns from a long dive, CO_{2} is not expired as fast as oxygen is replenished in the blood, due to the unloading complications with CO_{2}. However, having elevated levels of CO_{2} in the blood does not seem to adversely affect dive behavior. Compared to terrestrial mammals, sea lions have a higher tolerance to storing CO_{2} which is what normally tells mammals that they need to breathe. This ability to ignore a response to CO_{2} is likely brought on by increased carotid bodies which are sensors for oxygen levels that let the animal know its available oxygen supply. Yet, the sea lions cannot avoid the effects of gradual CO_{2} build-up which eventually causes the sea lions to spend more time at the surface after multiple repeated dives to allow for enough built up CO_{2} to be expired.

Sea lions experience sensory adaptations in different environments like aquatic or terrestrial. In California sea lion specifically, their eye structure is fit for both water and dry land like with light sensitivity for different conditions.

=== Parasites and diseases ===
Galapagos sea lions (Zalophus wollebaeki) can be infected with Philophthalmus zalophi, an eye fluke. These infections have heavy impacts on the survival of juveniles. The disease appears to be compounded by global warming, as the number of infectious stages of different parasites species has a strong correlation with temperature change. The Galapagos Islands go through seasonal changes in sea surface temperatures, which consist of high temperatures from the beginning of January through the month of May and lower temperatures throughout the rest of the year. Parasites surfaced in large numbers when the sea temperature was at its highest. Furthermore, data published in 2015 was collected by capturing sea lions in order to measure and determine their growth rates. Their growth rates were noted along with the sightings of parasites which were found under the eyelid. The results were that sea lions are affected by the parasites from the early ages of 3 weeks old up until the age of 4 to 8 months.

The parasites found in the eye fluke did serious damage to the eye. From the data collected, 21 of the 91 survived; with a total of 70 deaths in just a span of two years. The parasites are attacking the pups at such young ages and causing the pups to not reach the age of reproduction. The death rates of the pups is surpassing the fertility rate by far. Since most pups are unable to reach the age of reproduction, the population is not growing fast enough to keep the species out of endangerment. Other parasites, like Anisakis and heartworm, can also infect sea lions.

Australian sea lions (Neophoca cinerea) are also being affected by more frequent parasitic infections. The same method was used for the sea pups as on the Galapagos Islands, but in addition, the researchers in Australia took blood samples. The pups in Australia were being affected by hookworms, but they were also coming out in large numbers with warmer temperatures. New Zealand sea lion pups (Phocarctos hookeri) were also affected in really early ages by hookworms (Uncinaria). The difference is that in New Zealand researchers took the necessary steps and began treatment. The treatment seemed to be effective on the pups who have taken it. They found no traces of this infection afterwards. However, the percentage of pups who do have it is still relatively high at about 75%. Those pups who were treated had much better growth rates than those who did not. Overall parasites and hookworms are killing off enough pups to place them in endangerment. Parasites affect sea pups in various areas of the world. Reproductive success reduces immensely, survival methods, changes in health and growth have also been affected.

Similarly, climate change has resulted in increased toxic algae blooms in the oceans. These toxins are ingested by sardines and other fish which are then eaten by the sea lions, causing neurological damage and diseases such as epilepsy.

=== Gene expressions and diet ===
Gene expressions are being used more often to detect the physiological responses to nutrition, as well as other stressors. In a study done with four Steller sea lions (Eumetopias jubatus), three of the four sea lions underwent a 70-day trial which consisted of unrestricted food intake, acute nutritional stress, and chronic nutritional stress. Results showed that individuals under nutritional stress down-regulated some cellular processes within their immune response and oxidative stress. Nutritional stress was considered the most proximate cause of population decline in this species. In New Zealand sea lions, north-to south gradients driven by temperature differences were shown to be key factors in the prey mix. Adult California sea lions eat about 5% to 8% of their body weight per day (15–40 lb (6.8–18.1 kg)).

California sea lions feed mainly offshore in coastal areas. They eat a variety of prey—such as squid, anchovies, mackerel, rockfish, and sardines—found in upwelling areas. They also may take fish from commercial fishing gear, sport fishing lines, and fish passage facilities at dams and rivers.

=== Geographic variation ===
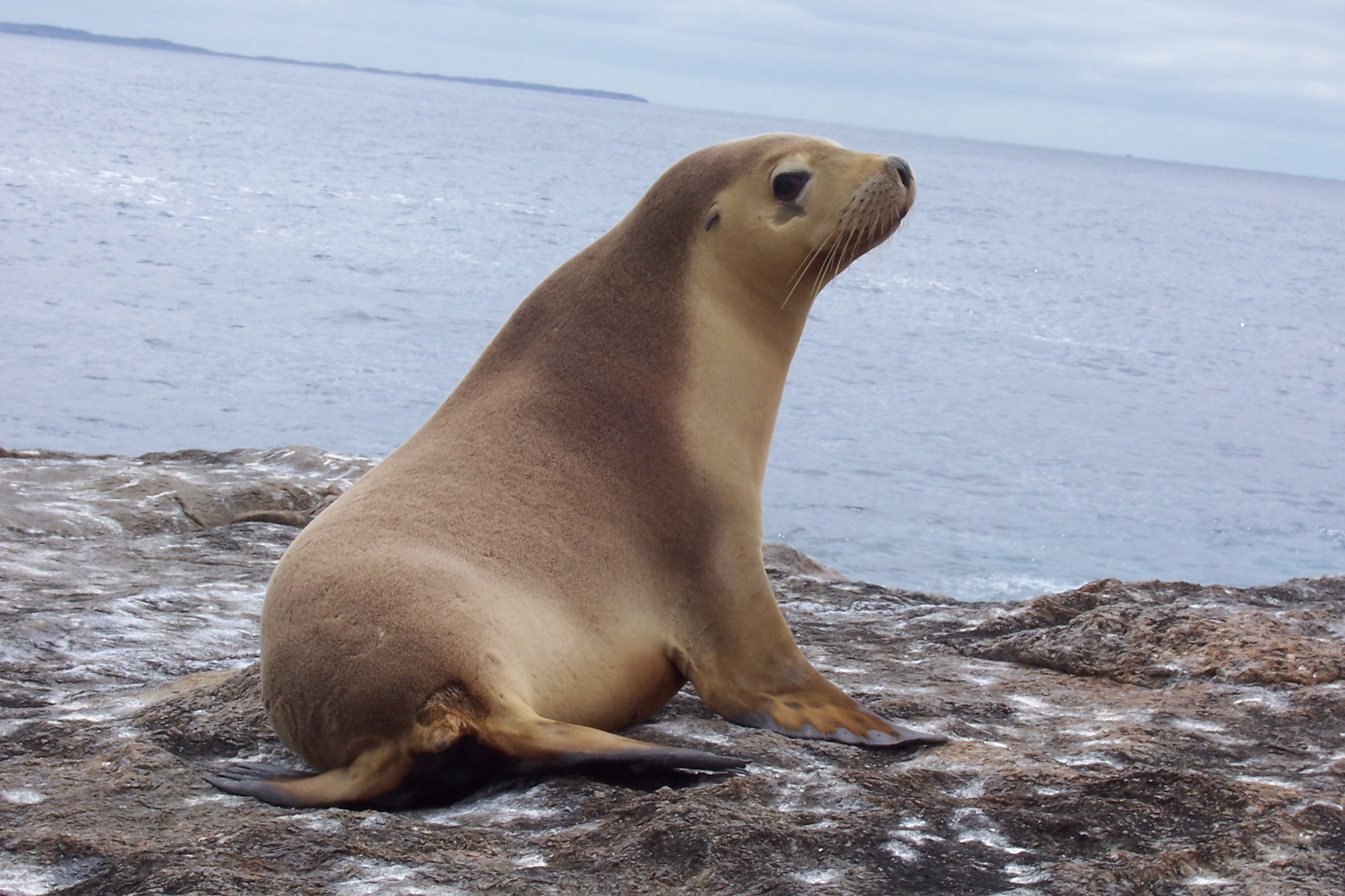
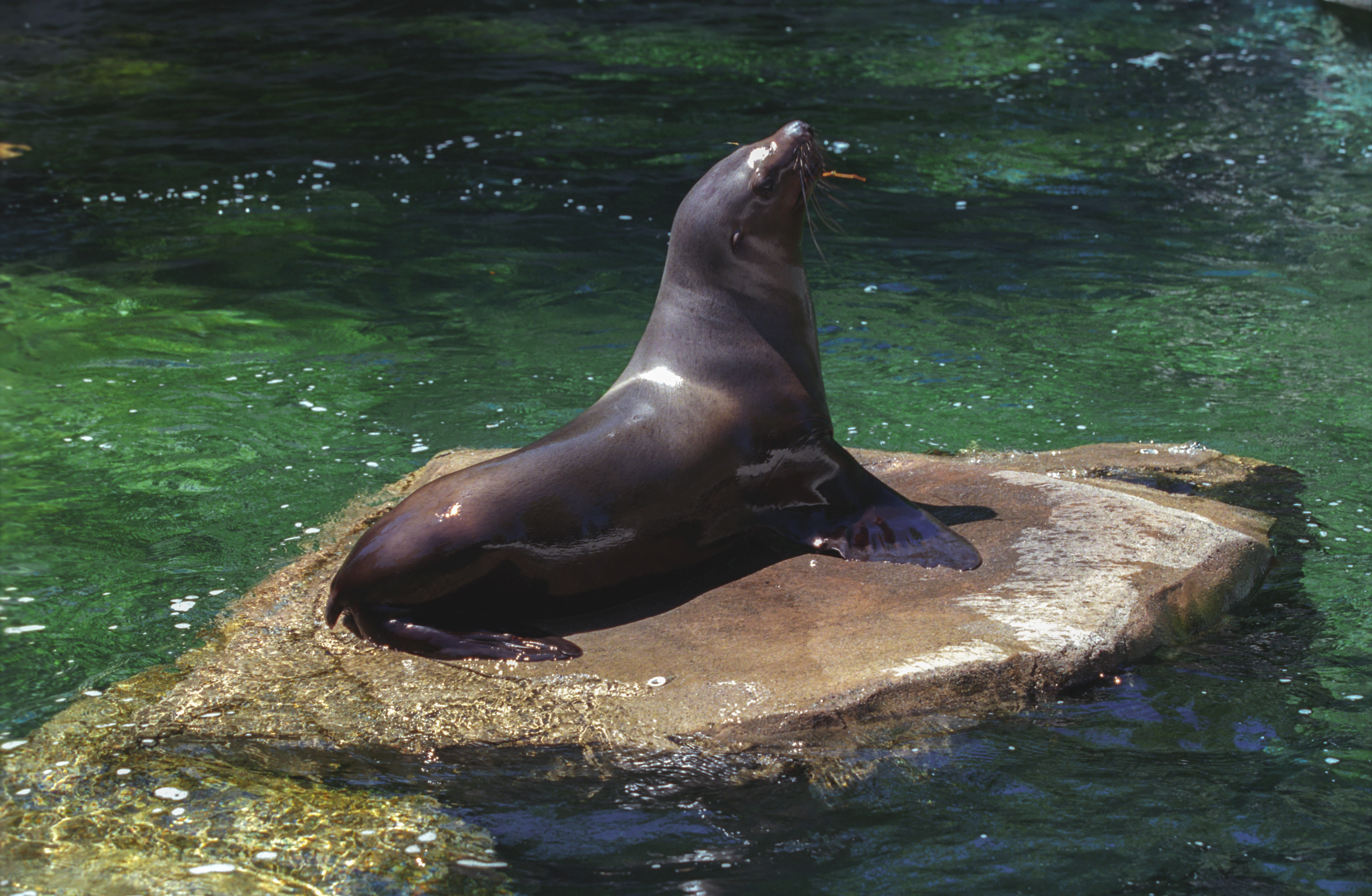
The Australian sea lion vs. the Steller sea lion

Geographic variation for sea lions have been determined by the observations of skulls of several Otariidae species; a general change in size corresponds with a change in latitude and primary productivity. Skulls of Australian sea lions from Western Australia were generally smaller in length whereas the largest skulls are from cool temperate localities. Otariidae are in the process of species divergence, much of which may be driven by local factors, particularly latitude and resources. Populations of a given species tend to be smaller in the tropics, increase in size with increasing latitude, and reach a maximum in sub-polar regions. In a cool climate and cold waters, there should be a selective advantage in the relative reduction of body surface area resulting from increased size, since the metabolic rate is related more closely to body surface area than to body weight.

== Breeding and population ==
=== Breeding methods and habits ===
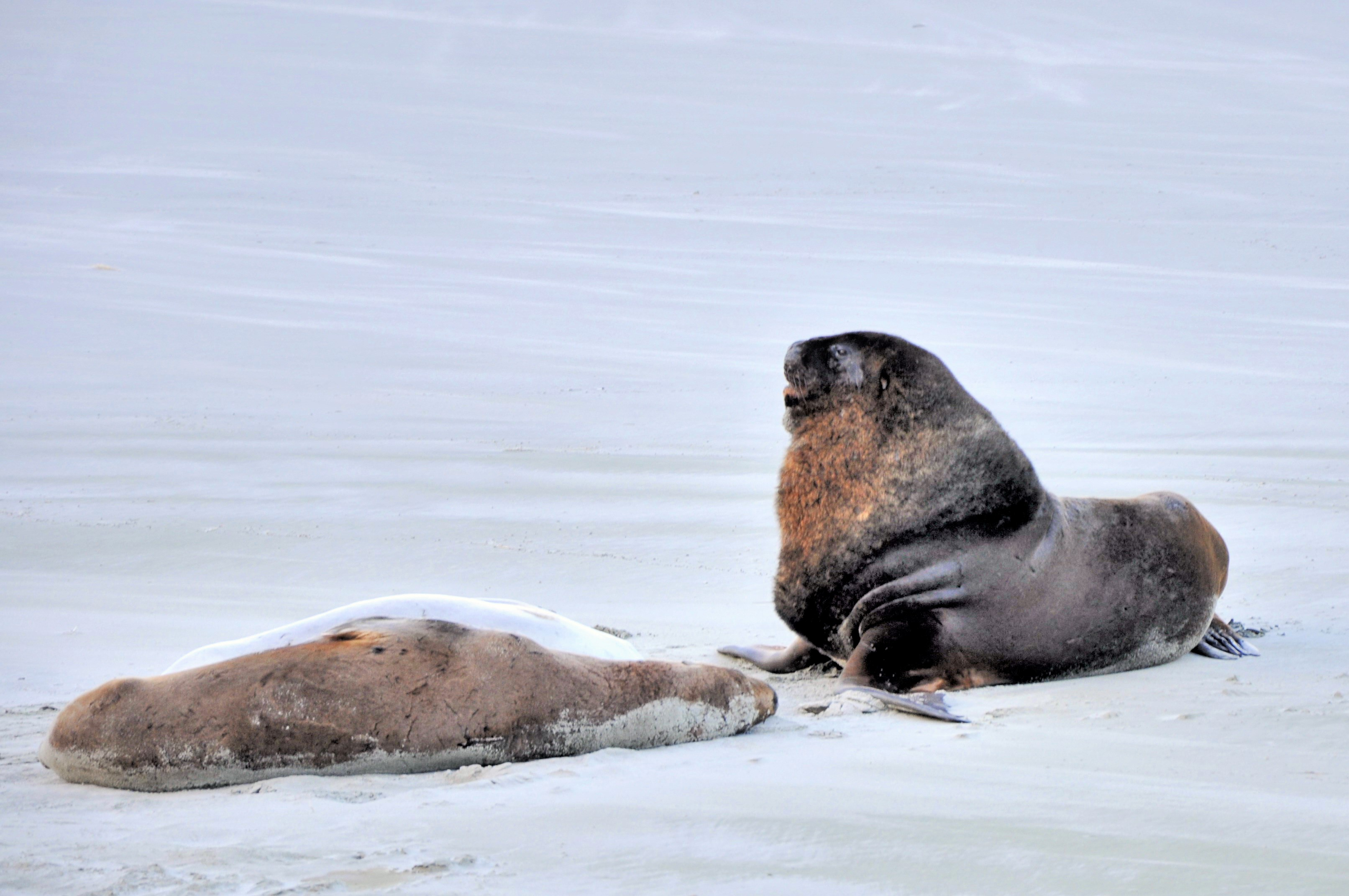
Two sea lions on the beach of Otago Peninsula, New Zealand

Sea lions, with three groups of pinnipeds, have multiple breeding methods and habits over their families but they remain relatively universal. Otariids, or eared sea lions, raise their young, mate, and rest in more earthly land or ice habitats. Their abundance and haul-out behavior have a direct effect on their on land breeding activity. Their seasonal abundance trend correlates with their breeding period between the austral summer of January to March. Their rookeries populate with newborn pups as well as male and female otariids that remain to defend their territories. At the end of the breeding period males disseminate for food and rest while females remain for nurturing. Other points in the year consist of a mix of ages and genders in the rookeries with haul-out patterns varying monthly.

Steller sea lions, living an average of 15 to 20 years, begin their breeding season when adult males establish territories along the rookeries in early May. Male sea lions reach sexual maturity from ages 5 to 7 and do not become territorial until around 9 to 13 years of age. The females arrive in late May bringing in an increase of territorial defense through fighting and boundary displays. After a week births consist most usually of one pup with a perinatal period of 3 to 13 days.

Steller sea lions have exhibited multiple competitive strategies for reproductive success. Sea lion mating is often polygamous as males usually mate with different females to increase fitness and success, leaving some males to not find a mate at all. Polygamous males rarely provide parental care towards the pup. Strategies used to monopolize females include the resource-defense polygyny, or occupying important female resources. This involves occupying and defending a territory with resources or features attractive to females during sexually receptive periods. Some of these factors may include pupping habitat and access to water. Other techniques include potentially limiting access of other males to females.

=== Population ===
Otaria flavescens (South American sea lion) lives along the Chilean coast with a population estimate of 165,000. According to the most recent surveys in northern and southern Chile the sealing period of the middle twentieth century that left a significant decline in sea lion population is recovering. The recovery is associated with less hunting, otariids rapid population growth, legislation on nature reserves, and new food resources. Haul-out patterns change the abundance of sea lions at particular times of the day, month, and year. Patterns in migration relate to temperature, solar radiation, and prey and water resources. Studies of South American sea lions and other otariids document maximum population on land during early afternoon, potentially due to haul-out during high air temperatures. Adult and subadult males do not show clear annual patterns, maximum abundance being found from October to January. Females and their pups hauled-out during austral winter months of June to September. There were surveys done in 1950-1980 on the population in northern sea lion abdundance and distribution. It was primary data for future conservational studies.

== Interactions with humans ==
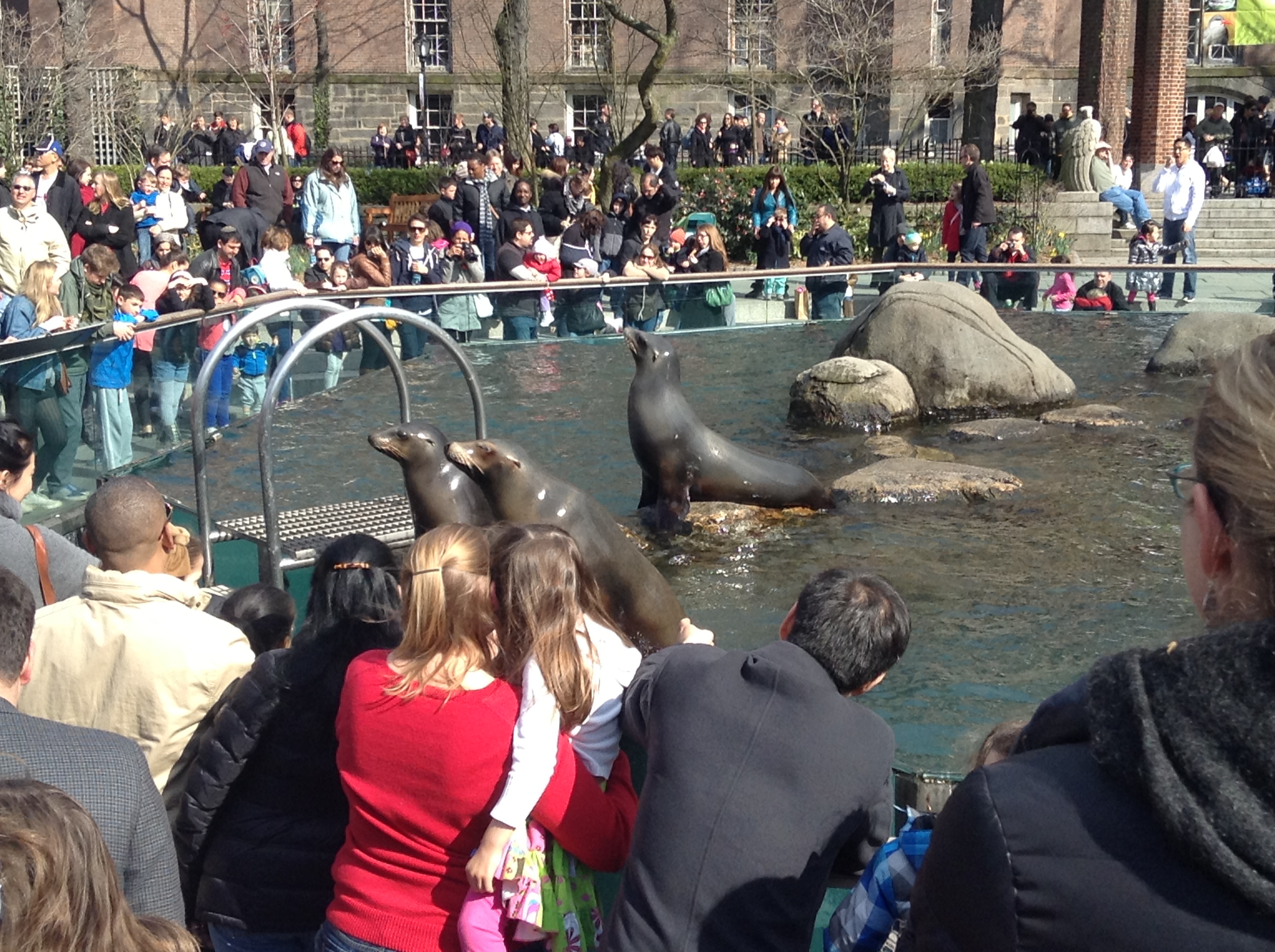
Sea lions entertain a crowd in Central Park Zoo

South American sea lions have been greatly impacted by human exploitation. During the late Holocene period to the middle of the twentieth century, hunter-gatherers along the Beagle Channel and northern Patagonia had greatly reduced the number of sea lions due to their hunting of the species and exploitation of the species' environment. Although sealing has been put to a halt, in many countries, such as Uruguay, the sea lion population continues to decline because of the drastic effects humans have on their ecosystems. As a result, South American sea lions have been foraging at higher tropical latitudes than they did prior to human exploitation. Fishermen play a key role in the endangerment of sea lions. Sea lions rely on fish, like pollock, as a food source and have to compete with fishermen for it. When fishermen are successful at their job, they greatly reduce the sea lion's food source, which in turn endangers the species. Also, human presence and human recreational activities can cause sea lions to engage in violent and aggressive actions. When humans come closer than 15 meters of a sea lion, the sea lions' vigilance increases because of the disturbance of humans. These disturbances can potentially cause sea lions to have psychological stress responses that cause the sea lions to retreat, sometimes even abandon their locations, and decreases the amount of time sea lions spend hauling out.

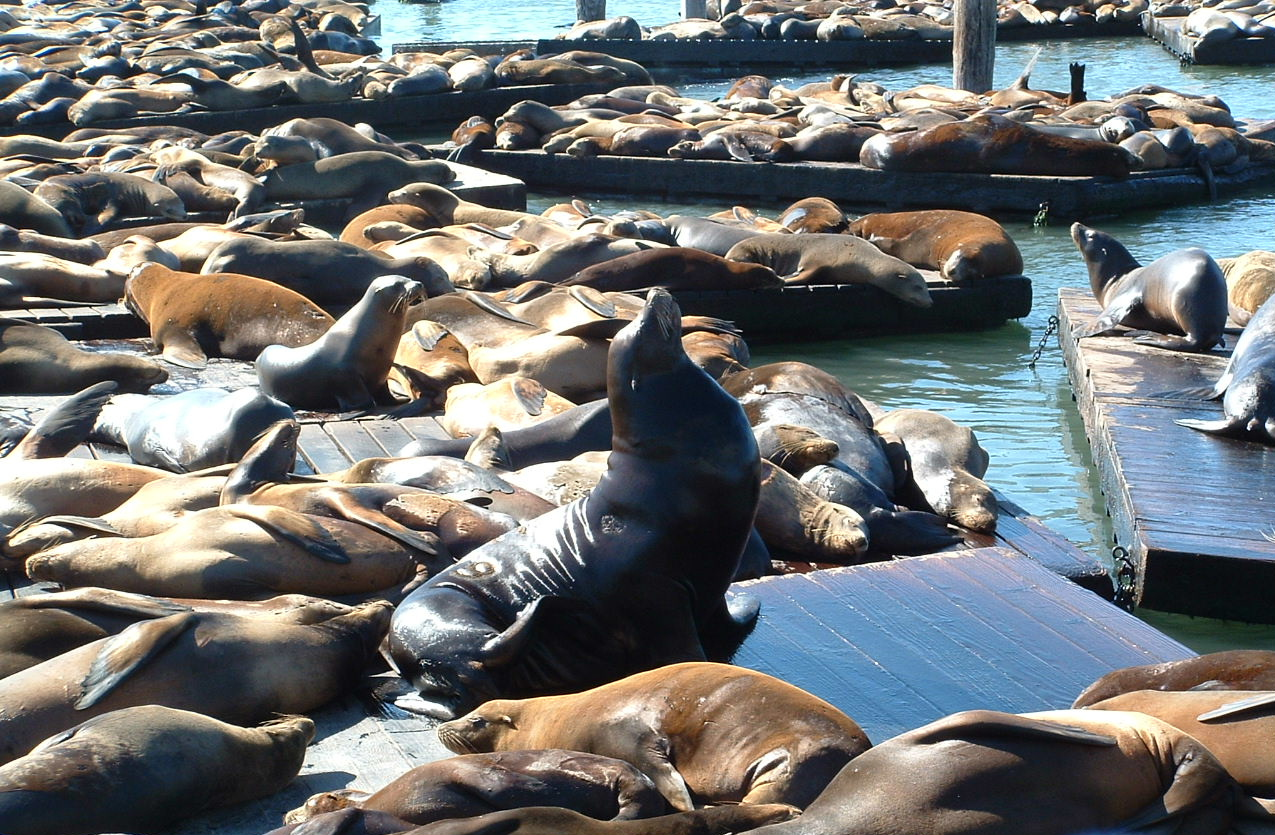
Hundreds of California sea lions congregating at Pier 39, San Francisco

New Zealand sea lions were also exploited from hunting and sealing, and as a result were extirpated from New Zealand's mainland for over 150 years, with their population being restricted to the subantarctic. In 1993, a female New Zealand sea lion gave birth on the mainland for the first time, and since then, they have slowly been recolonizing. These sea lions are the only pinnipeds that regularly move up to 2 kilometres (1.2 mi) inland into forests. As consequence, they have been hit by cars on roads, deliberately killed, and been disturbed by dogs. Females need to move inland as a way to protect their pups, so roads, fences, residential areas, and private lands can inhibit their dispersal and breeding success. They have also adapted to commercial pine forests, and have given birth or nursed pups in residents' backyards and on golf courses. As one of the world's rarest sea lions, and an endangered and endemic species, efforts are being made to facilitate coexistence between them and humans.

Sea lion attacks on humans are rare, but when humans come within approximately 2.5 meters (8 ft), it can be very unsafe. In 2005, Sebastián Piñera, then candidate to the Chilean presidency, was nearly bitten by a sea lion while campaigning in the southern city of Valdivia, with the incident being popular with the media nationwide. In a highly unusual attack in 2007 in Western Australia, a sea lion leapt from the water and mauled a 13-year-old girl surfing behind a speedboat. The sea lion appeared to be preparing for a second attack when the girl was rescued. An Australian marine biologist suggested that the sea lion may have viewed the girl "like a rag doll toy" to be played with. In San Francisco, where an increasingly large population of California sea lions crowds docks along San Francisco Bay, incidents have been reported in recent years of swimmers being bitten on the legs by large, aggressive males, possibly as territorial acts. In April 2015, a sea lion attacked a 62-year-old man who was boating with his wife in San Diego. The attack left the man with a punctured bone. In May 2017, a sea lion grabbed and pulled a girl into the water by her dress before retreating. The child was sitting on a pier side in British Columbia while tourists were illegally feeding the sea lions when the incident took place. She was pulled out of the water with minor injuries and received antibiotic prophylactic treatment for seal finger infection from the superficial bite injury.

There have also been documented events of sea lions assisting humans. One such notable instance of this is when Kevin Hines jumped off the Golden Gate Bridge in a suicide attempt and was helped to stay afloat by a sea lion until he was rescued by the Coast Guard.

Sea lions have also been a focus of tourism in Australia and New Zealand. One of the main sites to view sea lions is in the Carnac Island Nature Reserve near Perth in Western Australia. This tourist site receives over 100,000 visitors, many of whom are recreational boaters and tourists, who can watch the male sea lions haul out on to the shore. They have sometimes been called "the unofficial welcoming committee of the Galápagos Islands".

== Gallery ==
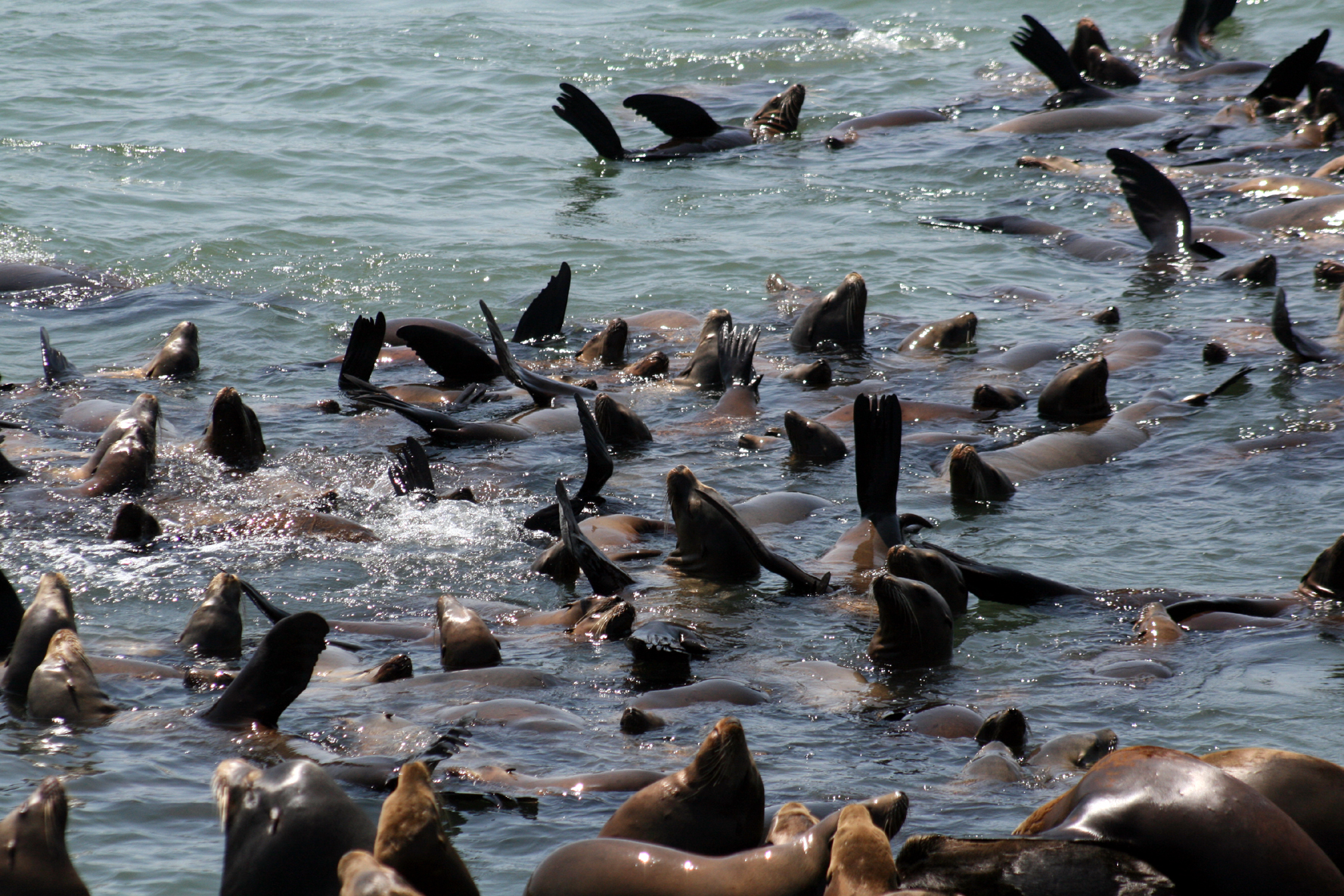
A gathering of more than 40 sea lions off the coast of Moss Landing, California

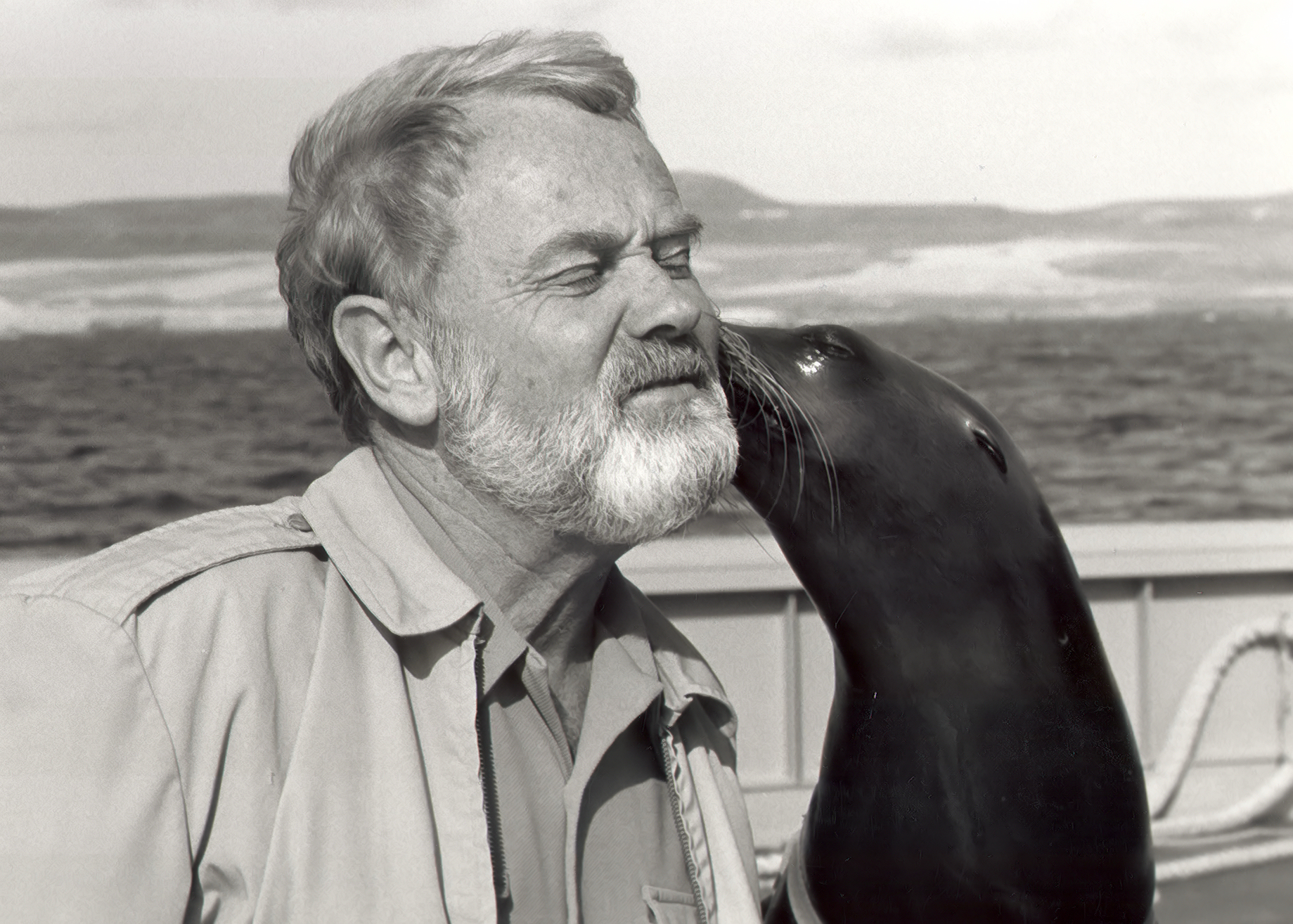
GiGi, a sea lion trained by the U.S. Navy for underwater recovery, nuzzles merchant mariner Capt. Arne Willehag of the USNS Sioux during a 1983 training session.

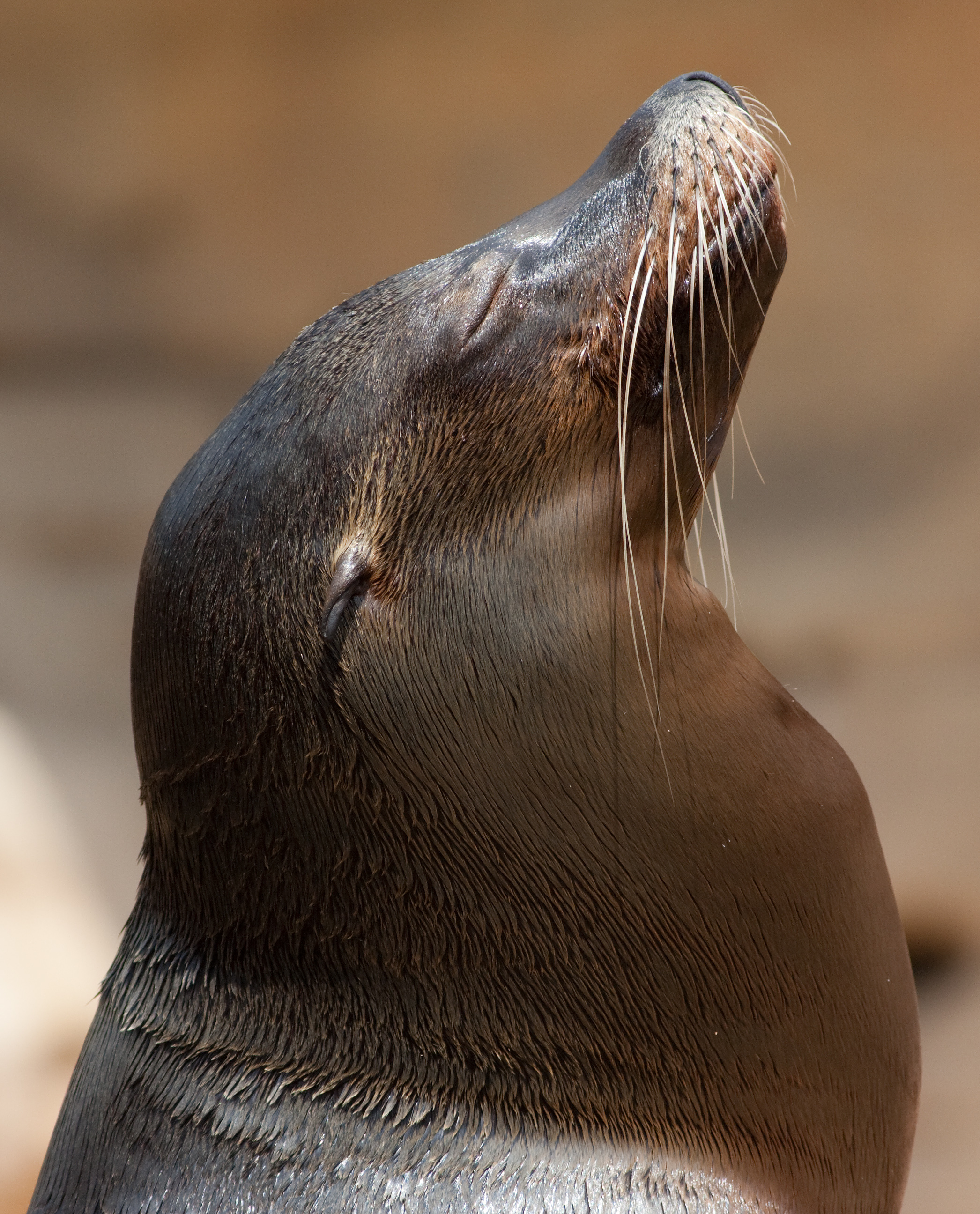
A sea lion at the Memphis Zoo

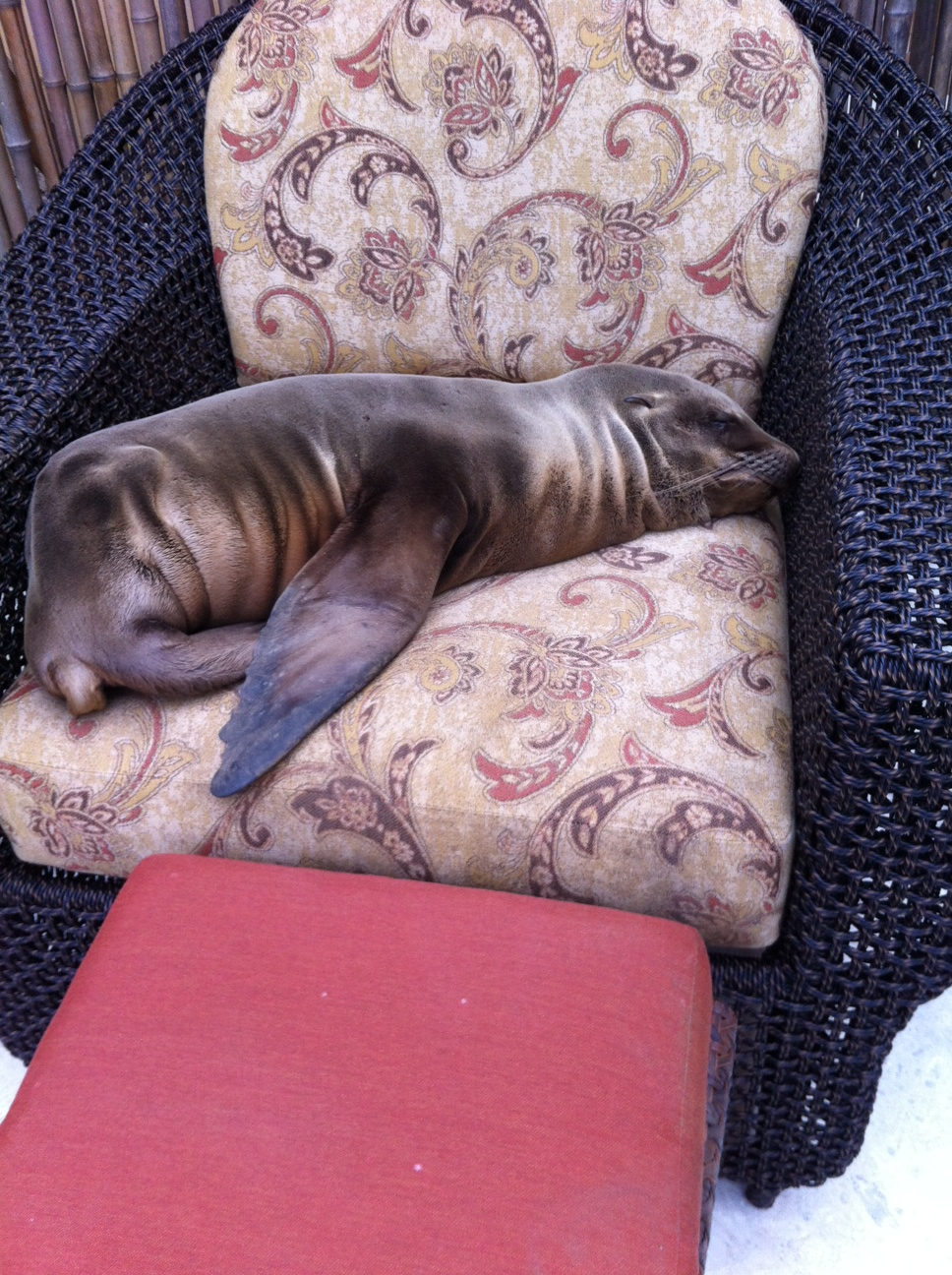
A sea lion pup sleeping at Pantai Inn

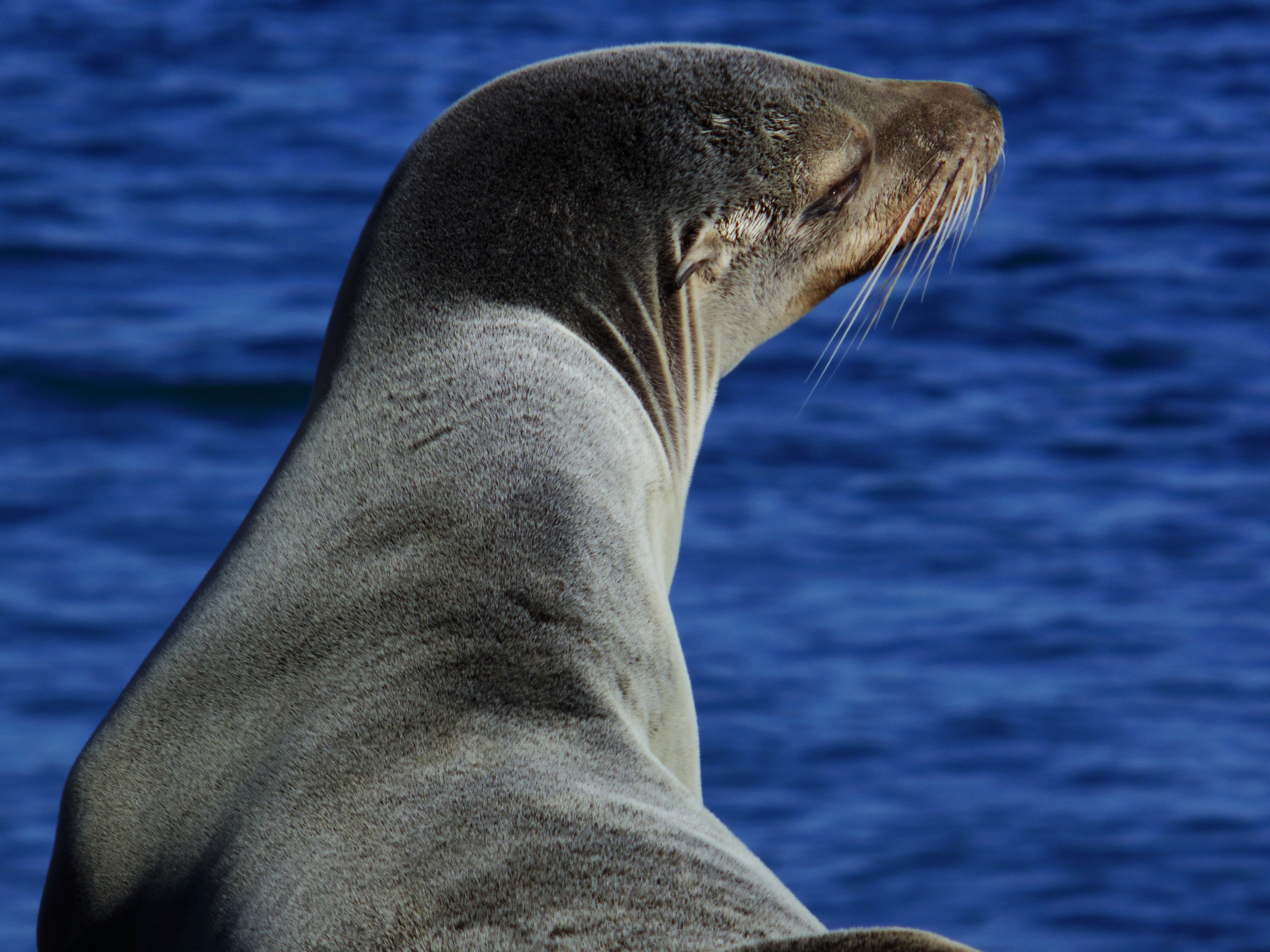
A sea lion in Malibu, California

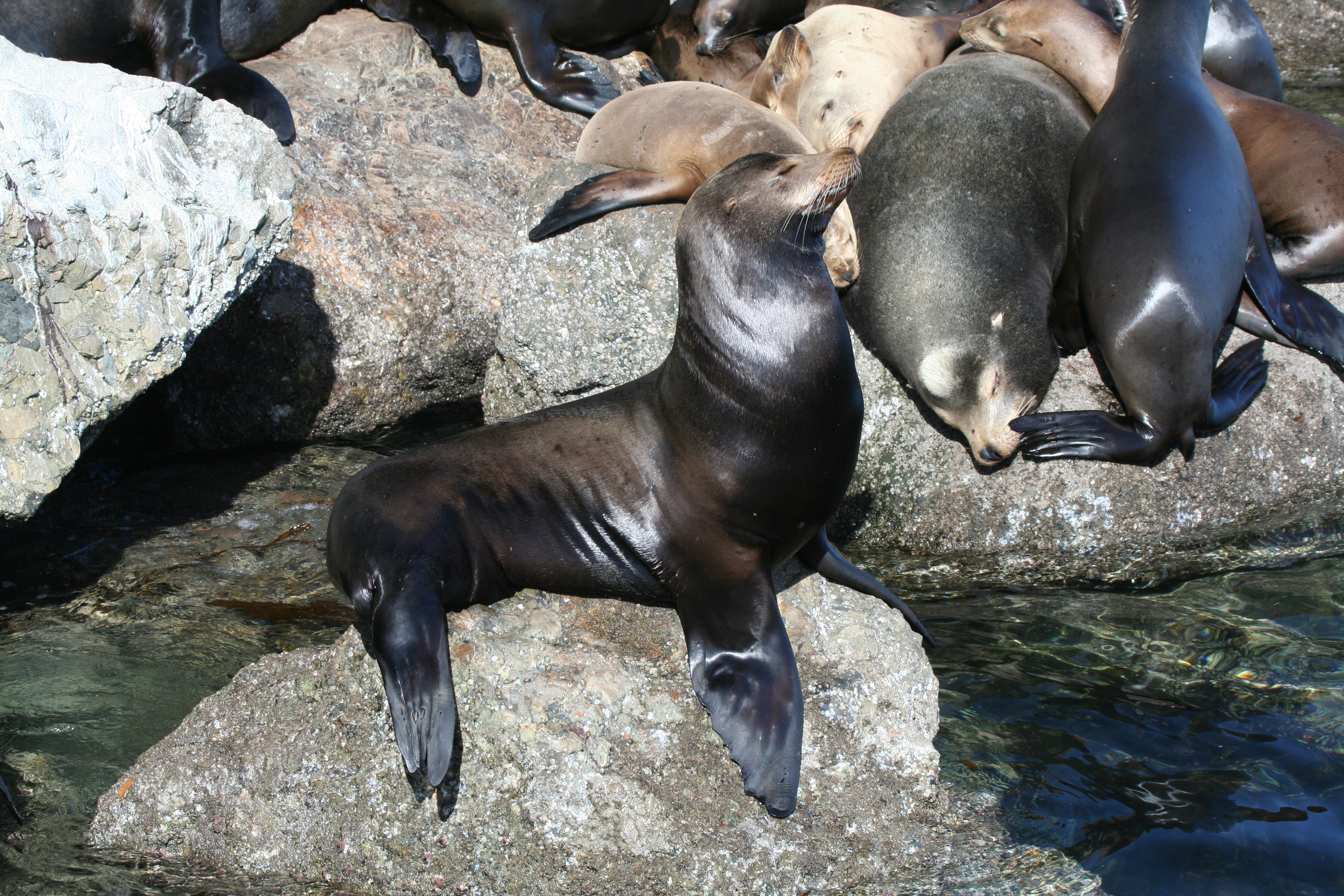
A sea lion at Monterey Breakwater

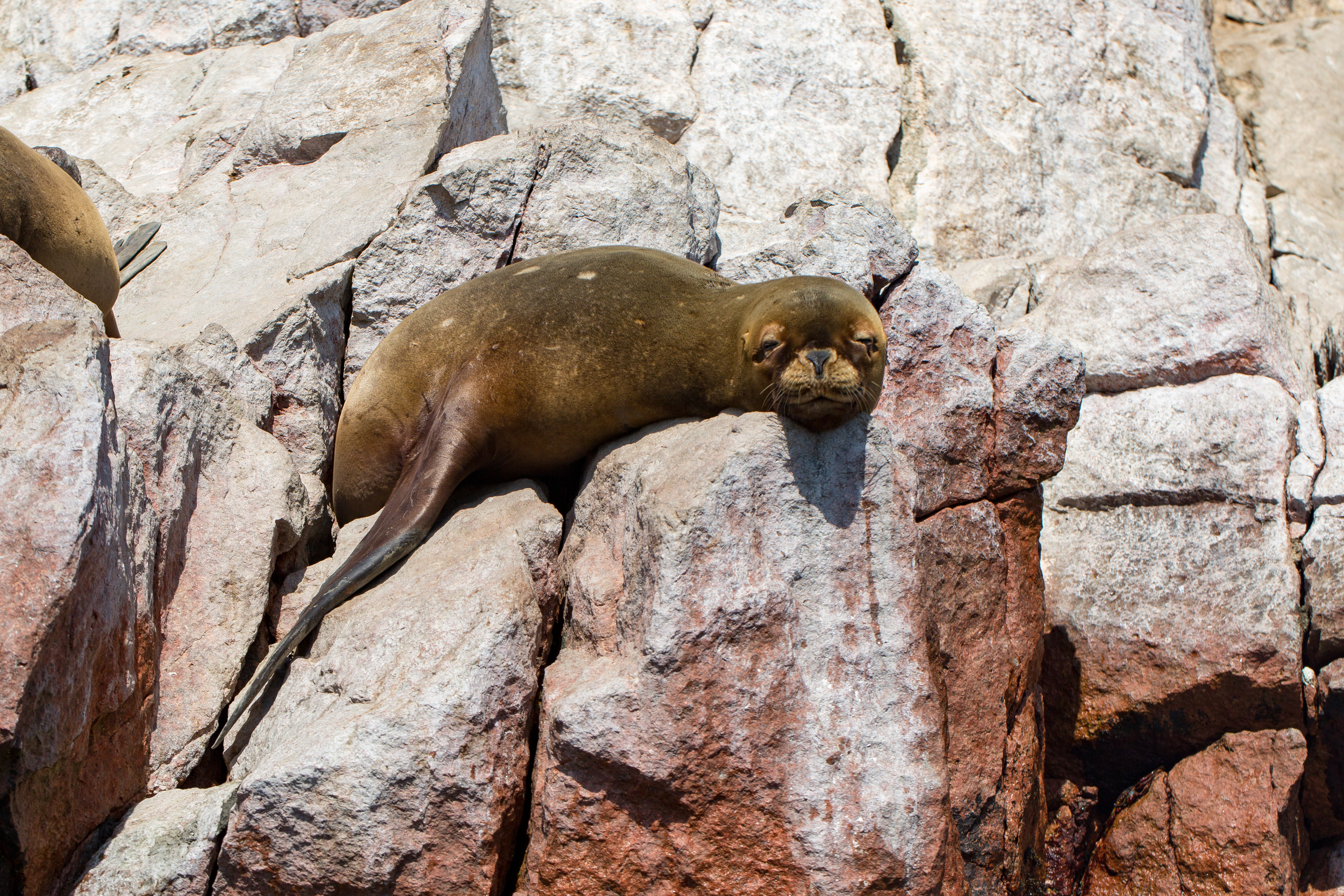
A sea lion sleeps in the Ballestas Islands, Peru

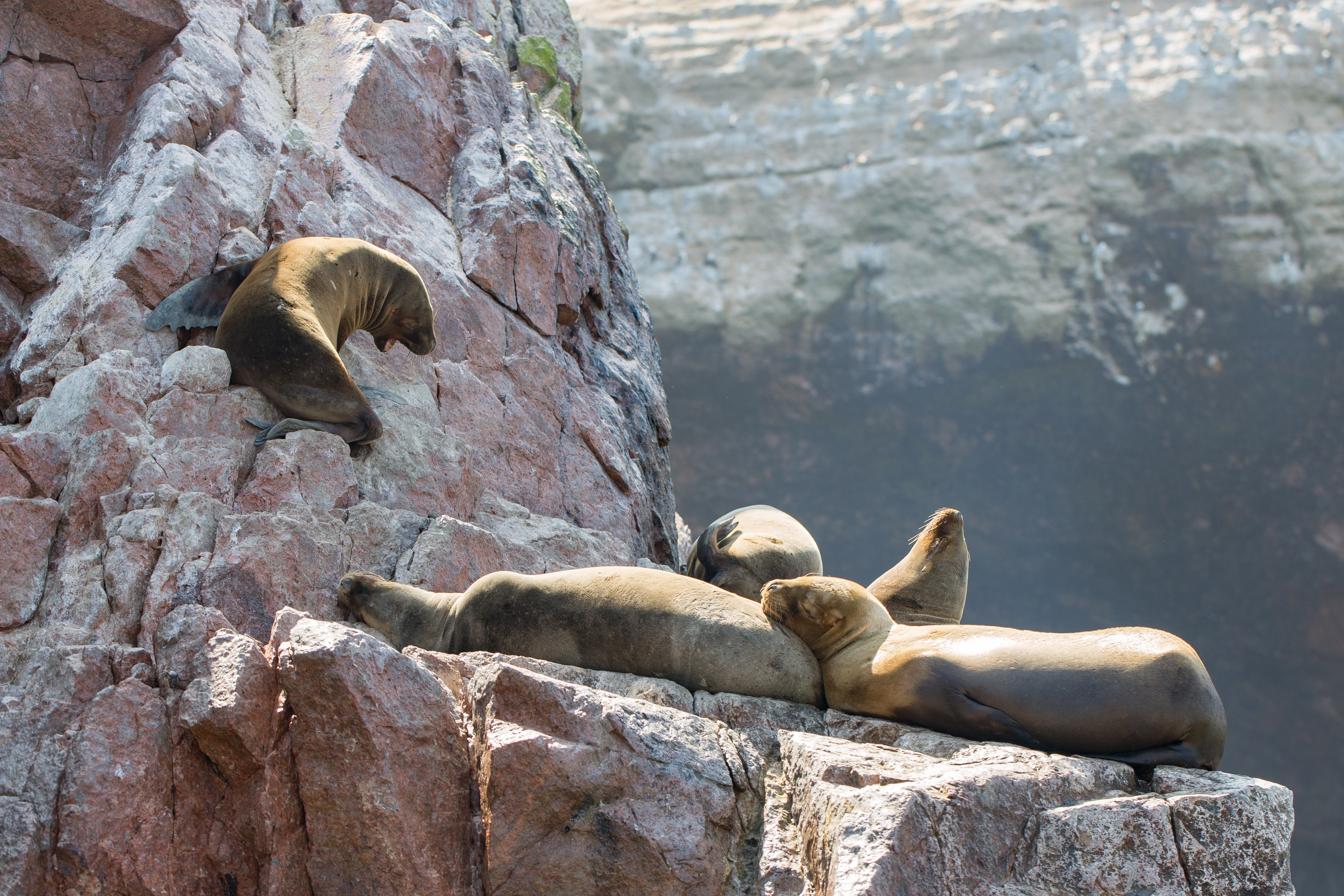
A group of sea lions rest in the Ballestas Islands, Peru

== See also ==
- List of carnivorans by population
