= Ernest A. Watkinson =

Canadian delegate and civil servant

Ernest A. Watkinson C.M. D.P.H. O.ST.J. E.D. (July 13, 1912 – December 22, 2011) served as an officer with the Canadian Forces during World War II, was a member of several important U.N. Committees, was a Canadian Delegate to the Fourth Geneva Convention (1949), was a member of the Canadian Delegation to the I.A.E.A. (1952), an Assistant Deputy Minister of the National Department of Health Canada (1971), and the Deputy Minister of Health of New Brunswick (1971–1976)

== History ==
=== Early years: 1912–1938 ===
Watkinson was born in Sault Ste. Marie, Ontario, on July 13, 1912. He graduated from Queen's University Medical School in 1939. He spent a short time as a physician at East General Hospital in Toronto before joining the Royal Canadian Army Medical Corps.

=== The war years: 1939–1945 ===
Watkinson spent much of World War II as the District Medical Officer attached to the Canadian Forestry Corps north of Inverness, Scotland. He treated patients at the Dunrobin Auxiliary Hospital located on the 2nd floor of Dunrobin Castle. Patients of interest during this time included Air Vice Marshal Collishaw, a World War I Air Force ACE, and Philip Mitford, a member of the famous Mitford family.

=== Postwar cleanup: 1945 ===
Towards the end of the War, Watkinson returned to Canada to become trained to join a Canadian Hygiene Unit in post-war Europe. Following VE Day, from May 1945 - July 1945, Watkinson took command of various Canadian Field Hygiene Units in Germany and Holland, including Oldenburg, Groningen, and Utrecht. Watkinson's units were on the front lines of the Allies post-war humanitarian efforts in Displaced Persons Camps, POW camps, and Slave Labour camps in the area. In late 1945, Watkinson was discharged from the R.C.M.A.C. after six years of service. Watkinson continued serving the Reserve Army, achieving the rank of lieutenant colonel in 1950 as commander of a casualty clearing station. He relinquished command in 1953.

camp

=== Civilian life: 1946–1956 ===
In 1946, Watkinson took various positions with the Department of Occupational Health in Ottawa. During this period, Watkinson declined a position offered to him over lunch by Tommy Douglas, the Premier of Saskatchewan, popularly known as the "father of Canada’s Medicare plan", to head up a new health unit in Swift Current.

==== 1949 - Geneva Conventions ====
During January and February 1949, Watkinson worked with members of External Affairs and National Defence for the Revision of the Geneva Convention for the Protection of Civilian Persons in Time of War. In late March, the Deputy Minister of National Health asked Watkinson to be a member of the Canadian Delegation to the Diplomatic Conference in Geneva, Switzerland, for the Revision of the Geneva Conventions. The head of the delegation was Emile Vaillancourt, Canadian Ambassador to Yugoslavia. During this period, Watkinson also began researching Seal Finger, a crippling infection of the forefinger afflicting the sealers of Newfoundland, Norway, and Finland.

==== 1950 - Cold War ====
During the beginning of the Cold War in 1950, Watkinson's attention was directed to Civil Defence duties with the Civil Defence Health Planning Group. In May 1950, Watkinson took over the supervision of nuclear uses across Canada.

==== 1953 - coronation of Q.E.II ====
In the spring of 1953, Watkinson was invited to again join the Canadian Delegation to the annual meeting of the International Labour Organization in Geneva, Switzerland. At this time, he was also invited to attend the coronation of Queen Elizabeth II.

==== 1955 - thalidomide crisis and atomic radiation ====
In 1955, Watkinson was appointed Chief of Occupational Health by Paul Martin, Minister of Health and father of Paul Martin (Jr.), who served as Prime Minister of Canada from 2003 to 2006. During his tenure he presided over the thalidomide crisis and was instrumental in awakening Canadians to the dangers of smoking cigarettes. More and more of Watkinson's professional time was taken over by dealing with the effects of atomic radiation. Colleagues of Watkinson's included Sir John Cockcroft, Candau (Director of the World Health Organization), Cipriani, and W. Lewis.

==== 1956 - United Nations ====
In 1956, Watkinson was appointed by Paul Martin to head of Canada's interests at U.N.S.C.E.A.R. – the United Nations Scientific Committee on the Effects of Atomic Radiation. Watkinson spent two years as vice-chairman of this committee. During this time, the Suez Crisis broke out, and another member of the Canadian delegation to the U.N., Lester B. Pearson, proposed the creation of a U.N. Peace-Keeping force, which peacefully resolved the Suez situation and for which Pearson was awarded the Nobel Peace Prize in 1957.

==== 1962 - anti-smoking ====
In 1962, Watkinson was appointed Assistant Director of the Health Services Branch of the Health Department of Canada. Watkinson's health duties included being constantly aware of new hazards to the public health. Watkinson's gave his attention to the possible effects of cigarette, pipe and cigar smoking on the health of Canadians. A study of the health of war veterans, made earlier by his Department, had shown a relationship among tobacco smokers with certain lung and heart diseases. Also, a well-known British epidemiologist, Doll, had just published a report on his studies of the effects of smoking on the health of smokers. On the basis of these investigations, Watkinson finally decided that it was necessary for a Canadian program to counter the effects of tobacco smoking. Watkinson was a pioneer in educating Canadians to the dangers of smoking through a new national campaign. He also called the presidents of all of the major Canadian tobacco companies to Ottawa to discuss the issue and encouraged Tobacco farmers to search for another suitable crop.

==== 1966 - International Joint Commission ====
In 1966, Watkinson was appointed chairman of several advisory boards to the International Joint Commission concerning the environmental health of the Great Lakes. The recommendations by the International Joint Commission were later embodied in an agreement between Canada and the United States on Great Lakes water quality. Watkinson was invited to the signing of the agreement in Ottawa in April 1972 by Pierre Trudeau, Prime Minister of Canada and Richard Nixon, President of the United States.

==== 1966 - Order of St. John ====
In 1966, Watkinson was awarded as an Officer (Brother) in the Order of St. John at Government House in Ottawa.

==== 1971 - Assistant Deputy Minister of Health, Canada ====
January 1971, Watkinson was appointed Assistant Deputy Minister and head of the Health Services Branch of the National Department of Health. The Department consisted of three Branches – Health Services, Hospital Services and Medical Services.

==== 1972 - Deputy Minister of Health, New Brunswick ====
As the new Deputy Minister of Health for New Brunswick, Watkinson was tasked with preparing a document for Cabinet setting out proposals for new hospitals in Moncton, Fredericton and Saint John. In the following six years, Watkinson oversaw the construction of additions to the Georges Dumont in Moncton (15 million dollars), a new hospital in Fredericton – the Dr. Everett Chalmers Hospital (45 million) and a new hospital in Saint John, costing over a hundred million dollars.

One controversial episode during his tenure that found Watkinson reported on by national media was the connection of Reye syndrome with the spraying of pesticides on spruce trees by the forestry industry. Another episode was the riots caused by Watkinson's decision to close certain rural hospitals due to the increasing costs of Canada's new national medicare program.

In 1976, Watkinson retired from public service and moved to the Toronto area, where he lived with his wife, Dorel, was cherished by his son John Stephen Watkinson, his daughter-in-law Marja Kristiina Kimppa Watkinson, and his many grandchildren. He continued to extol the virtues of public service until his death on December 22, 2011. He enjoyed the pleasures of life each day but with moderation; he celebrated his Platinum Jubilee (70th) marriage anniversary to his wife, Dorel, in 2009.

=== Publications ===
The 1949 Guide to the Diagnosis of Occupational Diseases received a favourable review in 1950 by the American Journal of Public Health.

== Canadian Army Service (1929–1953) ==
- 1929–1932 - Lieutenant- Sault Ste. Marie Regiment (Machine Gun)
- 1932–1939 – (Captain and Adjutant), Queen’s University, Canadian Officers Training Corps, (C.O.T.C.), Kingston, Ont.
- 1939–1940 – (Captain, R.C.A.M.C.), Medical Officer, Kingston Military Hospital
- 1940–1941 - Ottawa Military Hospital
- 1941–1942 – (Major) President, Standing Medical Board, Petawawa Military Camp
- 1942–1945 – Over-seas, W.W. II. Major, R.C.A.M.C.
- 1950–1953 – (Lieut.-Col) Officer Commanding No. 48 Casualty Clearing Station, Ottawa.
- 1951–1953 – Sec. Treas., Defence Medical Association of Canada
- August 6, 1969 – Placed on Retirement list of the Canadian Army.

== Decorations ==
- Officer Brother, Order of St. John of Jerusalem.
- Defence Medal – World War II
- Canadian Volunteer Service Medal and Clasp – World War II
- War Medal - World War II
- Centennial Decoration – 1967
- Queen’s Silver Jubilee Decoration – 25 Years Reign – 1977
- Efficiency Decoration – 20 years Army service – 1944 (World War II service counted double time).

== Notes ==
- "Batco document for Province of British Columbia" (PDF). Archived (PDF) from the original on 2003-03-28.
- Bertell, Rosalie. "Critique of ICRP structure and membership".
- "Ernest Alfred Watkinson M.D." The Globe and Mail. 27 December 2011. Archived from the original on 3 March 2016.
- "Minutes. Advisory committee for biology and medicine" (PDF). May 1953.
- "News and Notes". Canadian Medical Association Journal. 69 (6): 663–74. 1953. PMC 1824910.
