= Lists of mammals by population =

This is a collection of lists of mammal species by the estimated global population, divided by orders. Lists only exist for some orders; for example, the most diverse order - rodents - is missing. Much of the data in these lists were created by the International Union for Conservation of Nature (IUCN) Global Mammal Assessment Team, which consists of 1700 mammalogists from over 130 countries. They recognize 5488 species in the class.

These lists are not comprehensive, as not all mammals have had their numbers estimated. For example, a live specimen of the spade-toothed whale was first observed in December 2010, and the event only recognized as such in November 2012; no estimate yet exists for the global population. The accuracy of the quote numbers may only be an order of magnitude.

It is estimated that the total number of wild mammals in the world is about 130 billion.

== Lists by taxonomic order ==
Monotremata

- List of monotremes by population – platypus, echidnas

Marsupialia (infraclass containing 7 extant orders)

- List of marsupials by population – shrew opossums, opossums, marsupial moles, bandicoots, dasyurids, diprodonts (kangaroos, wallabies, wombats, koalas).

Xenarthra (superorder containing 2 extant orders)

- List of xenarthrans by population – anteaters, tree sloths, armadillos.

Afrotheria (superorder containing 6 extant orders)

- Proboscidea
  - List of elephant species by population – elephants.
- Hyracoidea, Sirenia, Tubulidentata, Macroscelidea, Afrosoricida
  - List of non-proboscid afrotheres by population – hyraxes, sea cows, aardvarks, elephant shrews, golden moles, otter shrews, tenrecs

Eulipotyphla

- List of eulipotyphlans by population – hedgehogs, shrews, moles, solenodons

Chiroptera

- List of bats by population – bats.

Pholidota

- List of pangolin species by population – pangolins

Carnivora

- List of carnivorans by population – cats, viverrids, hyenas, mongoose, canines, procyonids, bears, mustelids, skunks, and pinnipeds.

Perissodactyla

- List of odd-toed ungulates by population – equines, rhinoceroses, tapirs.

Artiodactyla

- List of even-toed ungulates by population – swine, hippopotamus, giraffes, chevrotains, cervids, bovids.
- List of cetacean species with population estimates – dolphins, porpoises, whales.

Scandentia

- List of tree shrews by population – tree shrews.

Lagomorpha

- List of lagomorphs by population – rabbits, hares, pikas.

Rodentia

- List of rodents by population – beavers, squirrels, mice, rats, etc.

Dermoptera

- List of colugos by population – colugos.

Primates

- List of primates by population – lemurs, lorises, tarsiers, monkeys, apes.

== See also ==
- List of birds by population
- Lists of organisms by population
- World population (humans)
