= Endangered species (IUCN status) =

Species categorized as likely to become extinct

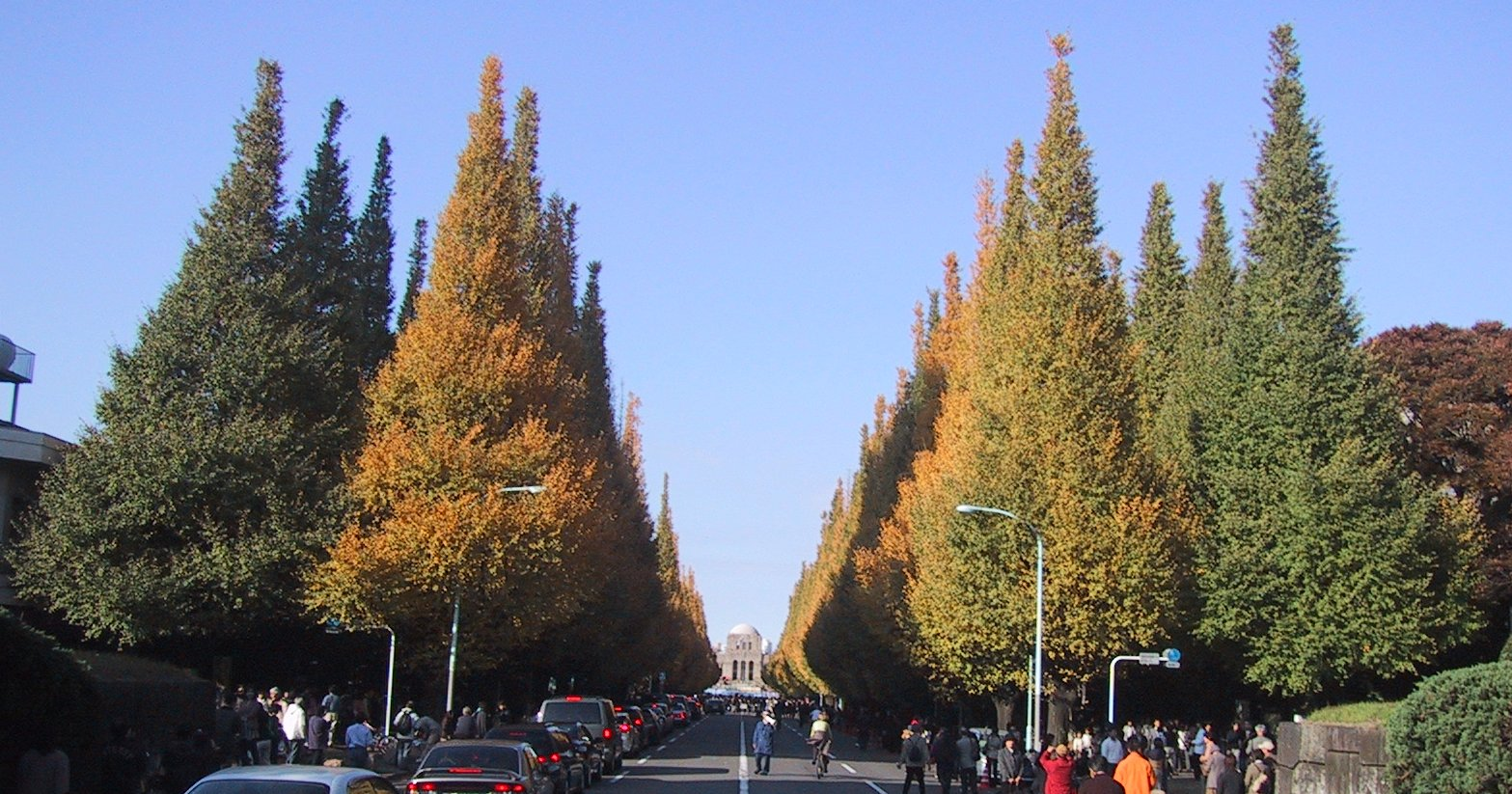
The Ginkgo tree (Ginkgo biloba) is listed as 'endangered' by the IUCN.

Endangered species, as classified by the International Union for Conservation of Nature (IUCN), are species which have been categorized as very likely to become extinct in their known native ranges in the near future. On the IUCN Red List, endangered is the second-most severe conservation status for wild populations in the IUCN's schema after critically endangered. In 2012, the IUCN Red List featured 3,079 animal and 2,655 plant species as endangered worldwide. The figures for 1998 were 1,102 and 1,197 respectively.

== IUCN Red List ==
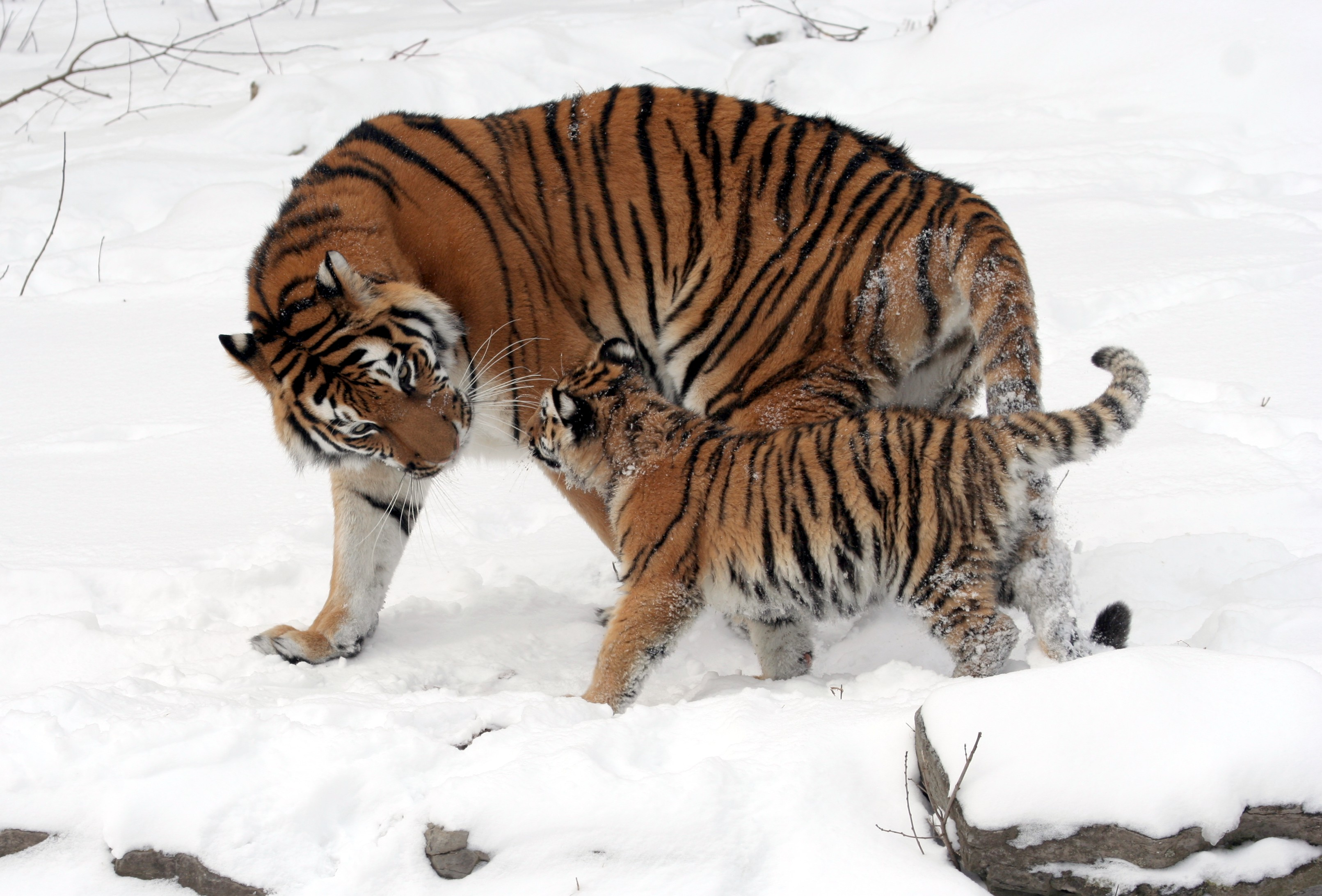
The Siberian tiger is an endangered tiger subspecies. Three tiger subspecies are extinct (see List of carnivorans by population).

The IUCN Red List is a list of species which have been assessed according to a system of assigning a global conservation status. According to the latest system used by the IUCN, a species can be "Data Deficient" (DD) – species for which more data and assessment is required before their situation may be determined – as well as species comprehensively assessed by the IUCN's species assessment process. A species can be "Near Threatened" (NT) and "Least Concern" (LC), these are species which are considered to have relatively robust and healthy populations, according to the assessment authors. "Endangered" (EN) species lie between "Vulnerable" (VU) and "Critically Endangered" (CR) species. A species must adhere to certain criteria in order to be placed in any of the afore-mentioned conservation status categories, according to the assessment.

"Threatened" is a category including all those species determined to be Vulnerable, Endangered or Critically Endangered.

Although in general conversation the terms "endangered species" and "threatened species" may mean other things, for the purposes of the current IUCN system, the List uses the terms "endangered" and "threatened" to denote species to which certain criteria apply. Note other status systems, such as national ones, may use other criteria.

Some examples of species classified as endangered by the IUCN are listed below:

- Amazon river dolphin
- Asian elephant
- Bermuda palmetto
- Blue whale
- Dawn redwood
- Egyptian vulture
- False gharial
- Georgia oak
- Giant oceanic manta ray
- Hector's dolphin
- Komodo dragon
- Korean fir
- Matschie's tree-kangaroo
- Mountain gorilla
- Old man cactus
- Pygmy hippopotamus
- Scimitar oryx
- Takahē
- Timneh parrot
- Wild horse
- Whooping crane
- Zebra shark

As more information becomes available, or as the conservation status criteria has changed, numerous species have been re-assessed as not endangered, nonetheless the total number of species considered endangered has increased as more new species are assessed for the first time each year.

== Criteria for endangered status ==
According to the 3.1 version of the IUCN conservation status system from 2001, a species is listed as endangered when it meets any of the following criteria from A to E.

A) Reduction in population size based on any of the following:

1. An observed, estimated, inferred or suspected population size reduction of ≥ 70% over the last 10 years or three generations, whichever is the longer, where the causes of the reduction are reversible AND understood AND ceased, based on (and specifying) any of the following:

- a. direct observation
- b. an index of abundance appropriate for the taxon
- c. a decline in area of occupancy, extent of occurrence or quality of habitat
- d. actual or potential levels of exploitation
- e. the effects of introduced taxa, hybridisation, pathogens, pollutants, competitors or parasites.

2. An observed, estimated, inferred or suspected population size reduction of ≥ 50% occurred over the last 10 years or three generations, whichever is the longer, where the reduction or its causes may not have ceased OR may not be understood OR may not be reversible, based on (and specifying) any of (a) to (e) under A1.

3. A population size reduction of ≥ 50%, projected or suspected to be met within the next 10 years or three generations, whichever is the longer (up to a maximum of 100 years), based on (and specifying) any of (b) to (e) under A1.

4. An observed, estimated, inferred, projected or suspected population size reduction of ≥ 50% over any 10 year or three-generation period, whichever is longer (up to a maximum of 100 years in the future), where the time period must include both the past and the future, and where the reduction or its causes may not have ceased OR may not be understood OR may not be reversible, based on (and specifying) any of (a) to (e) under A1.

B) Geographic range in the form of either B1 (extent of occurrence) OR B2 (area of occupancy) OR both:

1. Extent of occurrence estimated to be less than 5,000 km^{2}, and estimates indicating at least two of a-c:

- a. Severely fragmented or known to exist at no more than five locations.
- b. Continuing decline, inferred, observed or projected, in any of the following:
  - i. extent of occurrence
  - ii. area of occupancy
  - iii. area, extent or quality of habitat
  - iv. number of locations or subpopulations
  - v. number of mature individuals
- c. Extreme fluctuations in any of the following:
  - i. extent of occurrence
  - ii. area of occupancy
  - iii. number of locations or subpopulations
  - iv. number of mature individuals

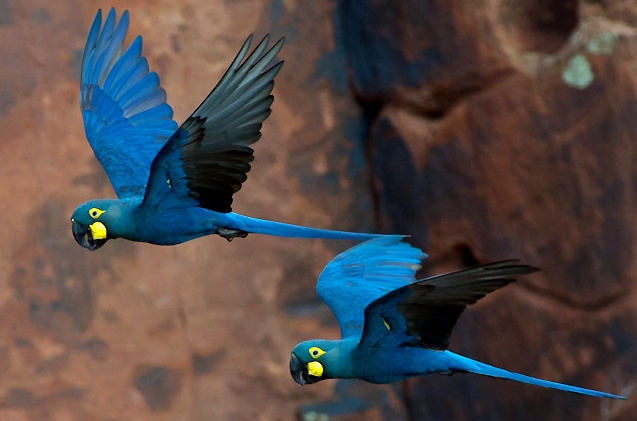
The Lear’s Macaw is an endangered species of Anodorhynchus, due to their territory being fragmented, and hunted for the illegal pet trade.

2. Area of occupancy estimated to be less than 500 km^{2}, and estimates indicating at least two of a-c:

- a. Severely fragmented or known to exist at no more than five locations.
- b. Continuing decline, inferred, observed or projected, in any of the following:
  - i. extent of occurrence
  - ii. area of occupancy
  - iii. area, extent or quality of habitat
  - iv. number of locations or subpopulations
  - v. number of mature individuals
- c. Extreme fluctuations in any of the following:
  - i. extent of occurrence
  - ii. area of occupancy
  - iii. number of locations or subpopulations
  - iv. number of mature individuals

C) Population estimated to number fewer than 2,500 mature individuals and either:

1. An estimated continuing decline of at least 20% within five years or two generations, whichever is longer, (up to a maximum of 100 years in the future) OR 2. A continuing decline, observed, projected, or inferred, in numbers of mature individuals AND at least one of the following (a-b):

- a. Population structure in the form of one of the following:
  - i. no subpopulation estimated to contain more than 250 mature individuals, OR
  - ii. at least 95% of older individuals in one subpopulation
- b. Extreme fluctuations in the number of older individuals

D) Population size estimated to number fewer than 250 mature individuals.

E) Quantitative analysis showing the probability of extinction in the wild is at least 20% within 20 years or five generations, whichever is the longer (up to a maximum of 100 years).

== See also ==
- Lists of IUCN Red List endangered species
- List of endangered amphibians
- List of endangered arthropods
- List of endangered birds
- List of endangered fishes
- List of endangered insects
- List of endangered invertebrates
- List of endangered mammals
- List of endangered molluscs
- List of endangered reptiles
- List of Chromista by conservation status
- List of fungi by conservation status
