= List of odd-toed ungulates by population =

This is a list of odd-toed ungulate species (order Perissodactyla) by estimated global population.

Unless otherwise noted, primary populations given are for number of mature individuals.

Common name	Binomial name	Population	Status	Trend	Notes	Image
Javan rhinoceros	Rhinoceros sondaicus	18	CR	Steady	Total population is estimated to be 68 individuals. Range is entirely restricted to western Java.	
African wild ass	Equus africanus	23–200	CR	▼	Total population is estimated to be 70 - 600 individuals.	
Sumatran rhinoceros	Dicerorhinus sumatrensis	30	CR	▼	Total population is estimated to be less than 80 individuals.	
Przewalski's horse	Equus ferus przewalskii	178	EN	▲	Wild population only. Total wild population is estimated to be 387 individuals. Previously extinct in the wild.	
Baird's tapir	Tapirus bairdii	1,600 - 2,300	EN	▼	Estimate is derived from regional estimates from Mosquitia and the Maya Forest.	
Grévy's zebra	Equus grevyi	1,956	EN	Steady	Total population is estimated to be 2,680 individuals.	
Indian rhinoceros (Greater one-horned rhino)	Rhinoceros unicornis	2,100-2,200	VU	▲	Total population is estimated to be 3,588 individuals.	
Malayan tapir	Tapirus indicus	2,499	EN	▼		
Mountain tapir	Tapirus pinchaque	2,500	EN	▼	Maximum estimate.	
South American tapir (Lowland tapir)	Tapirus terrestris	2,665 - 15,992	VU	▼	IUCN assessment does not provide a population estimate.	
Black rhinoceros	Diceros bicornis	3,142	CR	▲	Total population is estimated to be 5,630 individuals as of 2018.	
White rhinoceros	Ceratotherium simum	10,080	NT	▼	Total population is estimated to be 18,064 individuals.	
Mountain zebra	Equus zebra	34,979	VU	▲	Two subspecies: Hartmann's (33,265 mature individuals) & Cape (1,714 - 3,247 mature individuals).	
Asiatic wild ass (Onager)	Equus hemionus	65,000	NT	Steady	Total population is estimated to be 108,300 individuals.	
Kiang	Equus kiang	60,000–70,000	LC	Steady	Values given are for total population.	
Plains zebra	Equus quagga	150,000-250,000	NT	▼	Total population is estimated to be 500,000 individuals.	
Mule	Equus asinus x Equus caballus	7,700,000	Domesticated		Value given is the 2024 estimate given by the FAO for worldwide population, rounded to nearest hundred thousand.	
Donkey	Equus africanus asinus	53,900,000	Domesticated		Value given is the 2024 estimate given by the FAO for worldwide population, rounded to nearest hundred thousand.	
Horse	Equus ferus caballus	56,200,000	Domesticated		Value given is the 2024 estimate given by the FAO for worldwide population, rounded to nearest hundred thousand.	

== See also ==
- Lists of mammals by population
- Lists of organisms by population
