= List of elephant species by population =

This is a list of estimated global populations of elephant species (including delineated subspecies of Asian elephant). This list is generally comprehensive, but there is also uncertainty to some estimations.

| Common name | Binomial name/Trinomial name | Population | Status | Trend | Notes | Image |
|---|---|---|---|---|---|---|
| African bush elephant (African savannah elephant) | Loxodonta africana | 352,000 | EN | ▼ | The population has been reduced dramatically (african elephant populations in 18 countries declined by ~30%) since a mass ivory sell off by southern african countries in the early 2000's to present time. Although slight population increases were noted in certain SADC states (principally Botswana, Namibia, South Africa, and Zimbabwe), the continental Loxodonta africana metapopulation has declined dramatically. | |
| African forest elephant | Loxodonta cyclotis | 140,000 | CR | ▼ | Found primarily in the Congo Basin rainforest biome and ecoregions with remnant populations in the W-Arly-Pendjari Complex, Guinean Forests of West Africa and one or more islands in the southern Niger Delta. | |
| Asian elephant | Elephas maximus | 48,323 - 51,680 | EN | ▼ | Extant in South Asia and Southeast Asia. | |
| Indian elephant | Elephas maximus indicus | 27,312 | EN | ▼ | Extant in the Indian sub-continent and Southeast Asia, including Southwestern China (Xishuangbanna, Yunnan Province). | |
| Sri Lankan elephant | Elephas maximus maximus | 7,000 | EN | ▼ | Endemic to Sri Lanka. | |
| Sumatran elephant | Elephas maximus sumatranus | 2,400–2,800 | CR | ▼ | Endemic to Sumatra. | |
| Borneo elephant | Elephas maximus borneensis | 1,000–1,600 | EN | ▼ | Endemic to Borneo/Kalimantan. | |

== See also ==
- Lists of organisms by population
- Lists of mammals by population
