= List of lagomorphs by population =

This is a list of estimated global populations of Lagomorpha species. This list is not comprehensive, as not all Lagomorphs have had their numbers quantified.

Common name	Binomial name	Population	Status	Trend	Notes	Image
Riverine rabbit	Bunolagus monticularis	157 – 207	CR	▼	Values given are for number of mature individuals. Total population is estimated to be 224 - 380 individuals.	
Tehuantepec jackrabbit	Lepus flavigularis	292	EN	▼		
Black jackrabbit	Lepus insularis	923	VU	Steady	Total population is estimated to fall between 537-1,586 individuals.	
Volcano rabbit	Romerolagus diazi	7,000	EN	▼		
Smith's red rockhare	Pronolagus rupestris	10,000	LC	?		
Hewitt's red rock hare	Pronolagus saundersiae	> 10,000	LC	?		
New England cottontail	Sylvilagus transitionalis	17,000	VU	▼		
