= Seal finger =

- Other names: spekkfinger, salen i fingret (Norwegian); salrota (Baltic languages) ('in the Gulf of Finland')
- Specialty: Infectious Disease
- Causes: Contact with seals or other pinnipeds
- Treatment: Large doses of antibiotics, including tetracycline; previously amputation

Seal finger, also known as sealer's finger and spekkfinger (from the Norwegian word for "blubber"), is an infection that afflicts the fingers of seal hunters and other people who handle seals, as a result of bites or contact with exposed seal bones; it has also been contracted by exposure to untreated seal pelts. The State of Alaska Section of Epidemiology defines it as "a finger infection associated with bites, cuts, or scratches contaminated by the mouths, blood, or blubber of certain marine mammals".

Seal finger was first described scientifically in 1907. It can cause cellulitis, joint inflammation, and swelling of the bone marrow; untreated, the course of "seal finger" is slow and often results in a thickened, contracted joint. Historically, seal finger was treated by amputation of the affected digits once they became unusable. Ariana Bindman, for SFGATE in 2023, reported that "for hundreds of years, fishers long feared contracting" it due to amputation. In the present day, seal finger is more commonly an "affliction among biologists, veterinarians and scuba divers".

The precise nature of the organism responsible for seal finger is unknown, as it has resisted culturing because most cases are promptly treated with antibiotics. However, as seal finger can be treated with tetracycline or similar antibiotics, the causative organism is most likely bacterial. In 1991, the first reported association of Mycoplasma with seal finger occurred, following a seal bite sustained by a trainer at the New England Aquarium. In 1998, researchers Baker, Ruoff, and Madoff concluded the responsible organism was most likely a species of Mycoplasma called Mycoplasma phocacerebrale. This Mycoplasma was isolated in an epidemic of seal disease occurring in the Baltic Sea.
