= List of carnivorans by population =

This is a list of estimated global populations of Carnivora species. This list is not comprehensive, as not all carnivorans have had their numbers quantified.

== List ==
Common name	Binomial name	Population	Status	Trend	Notes	Image
Red wolf	Canis rufus	20-30	CR	▼	Previously extinct in the wild. Reintroduction efforts have been hampered by hybridization with coyotes (C. latrans).	
Iriomote cat	Prionailurus bengalensis iriomotensis	100–109	CR	▼	A subspecies of the leopard cat living exclusively on the Japanese island of Iriomote. Population size is declining, and consists of a single subpopulation.	
Amur leopard	Panthera pardus orientalis	129-130	CR	▼	Subspecies of leopard (P. pardus). Numbers have fluctuated in recent censuses. Newest estimate of mature individuals comes from IUCN Assessment for P. pardus.	
Saimaa ringed seal	Pusa hispida saimensis	135-190	EN	▲	Subspecies of ringed seal (P. hispida). Total population was estimated to be 320 individuals in 2015.	
Asiatic lion	Panthera leo leo	175	EN	Steady	Total population size is estimated to be 350 individuals.	
Cozumel raccoon (Pygmy raccoon)	Procyon pygmaeus	192	CR	▼	Total population is estimated to be 323-955 individuals. Populations are severely affected by hurricanes.	
Ethiopian wolf	Canis simensis	197	EN	▼	Total population is estimated to be 360-440 adults.	
Black-footed ferret	Mustela nigripes	206	EN	▼	Value given is for number of mature adults living in self-sustaining wild populations. More than 300 individuals are currently held in captive breeding programs.	
Malabar large-spotted civet (Malabar civet)	Viverra civettina	249	CR	▼	Maximum estimate; may be extinct.	
Siberian tiger	Panthera tigris tigris	265-486	EN	Steady	Subspecies of tiger (P. tigris). Population size and trend are available in the supplementary information available on the P. tigris assessment (estimates of tiger numbers in Russia).	
Mediterranean monk seal	Monachus monachus	444-600	VU	▲	Values given are for mature individuals. There are three primary subpopulations: Madeira: 27 individuals; Ras Nouadhibou: 350 individuals; eastern Mediterranean: not given, but estimated to produce ~97 pups annually.	
Persian leopard	Panthera pardus tulliana	450-626	EN	▼	Subspecies of leopard (P. pardus). Total population is estimated to be 750–1,044 individuals.	
Giant panda	Ailuropoda melanoleuca	500-1,000	VU	▲	Total population is estimated to be 1,864 individuals.	
Iberian lynx	Lynx pardinus	648	VU	▲	Total population is estimated to be 1,668 individuals.	
Darwin's fox	Pseudalopex fulvipes	659-2,499	EN	▼	Minimum number of mature individuals is expected to be 489. No upper limit presented.	
Hawaiian monk seal	Neomonachus schauinslandi	922	VU	▲	Total population is estimated to be 1,607 individuals.	
Dhole	Cuon alpinus	949-2,215	EN	▼	Total population is estimated to be 4,500–10,500 individuals. Population estimates were calculated assuming proportion of mature individuals in population is similar to that of African wild dogs.	
Asian golden cat	Catopuma temminckii	1,000-12,000	VU	▼	Best estimate for number of mature individuals is 7,000.	
Chinese mountain cat	Felis bieti	1,177-23,540	VU	▼	Total population is estimated to be 2,354–47,081 individuals, though a best estimate is expected to be < 10,000 mature individuals.	
African wild dog	Lycaon pictus	1,676	EN	▼	Value given is for number of mature individuals.	
Andean mountain cat (Andean cat)	Leopardus jacobita	2,177	EN	▼	Total population is estimated to be 4,354 individuals.	
Bay cat (Borneo bay cat)	Catopuma badia	2,200	EN	▼	Value given is for number of mature individuals.	
Otter civet	Cynogale bennettii	2,490	EN	▼	Value given is estimate for mature individuals.	
Flat-headed cat	Prionailurus planiceps	2,499	EN	▼	Value given is for number of mature individuals.	
Spectacled bear (Andean bear)	Tremarctos ornatus	2,500-10,000	VU	▼	Total population is estimated to be 13,000-18,000 individuals.	
Tiger	Panthera tigris	2,608-3,905	EN	▼	Best estimate for number of mature individuals is 3,140. Total population is estimated to be 3,726-5,578 individuals, not including cubs.	
Fossa (Fosa)	Cryptoprocta ferox	2,635-8,626	VU	▼	Values given are for number of mature individuals.	
Grandidier's mongoose (Grandidier's vontsira)	Galidictis grandidieri	2,650–3,540	EN	▼	Values given are estimate for total population, ca. 2006.	
Snow leopard	Panthera uncia	2,710-3,386	VU	▼	Most recent "best guess" estimate for total population is 3,920-6,390 individuals, from 2013.	
New Zealand sea lion	Phocarctos hookeri	3,031	EN	▼	Value given is for number of mature individuals.	
Clouded leopard	Neofelis nebulosa	3,700	VU	▼	Total population is estimated to be 5,580 individuals.	
Island fox	Urocyon littoralis	4,001	NT	▲	Total population is estimated to be 5,500 individuals.	
Brown hyena (Brown hyaena)	Parahyaena brunnea	4,365-10,111	NT	Steady	Values given are for number of mature individuals. Total population is expected to be, at minimum, 5,000-8,000 individuals, though the Botswanan population may have several thousand individuals not considered.	
Sunda clouded leopard	Neofelis diardi	4,500	VU	▼	Value given is for number of mature individuals, with an estimated 3,800 on Borneo and 730 on Sumatra.	
Striped hyena (Striped hyaena)	Hyaena hyaena	5,000-9,999	NT	▼	Total population is estimated to be 5,000-14,000 individuals, ca. 1998.	
Southern tiger cat	Leopardus guttulus	6,047	VU	▼	Value given is estimate for mature individuals.	
Giant otter	Pteronura brasiliensis	>6,450	EN	▼	Value given is absolute minimum for total population. Estimates are not available for all subpopulations.	
Australian sea lion	Neophoca cinerea	6,500	EN	▼	Total population is estimated to be 12,690 individuals.	
Cheetah	Acinonyx jubatus	6,517	VU	▼	Total population of adults and adolescents is estimated to be 7,100 individuals.	
West African oyan	Poiana leightoni	6,700-10,000	VU	▼	Most recent confirmed records of this species are from the 1980s.	
Crested genet	Genetta cristata	7,000	VU	▼	Value given is estimate for mature individuals.	
Oncilla (Northern tiger cat)	Leopardus tigrinus	8,932-10,208	VU	▼	Values given are for estimate number of adult individuals.	
Sulawesi palm civet (Sulawesi civet)	Macrogalidia musschenbroekii	9,000	VU	▼	Value given is estimate for mature individuals.	
Galápagos sea lion	Zalophus wollebaeki	9,200-10,600	EN	▼	Total population is estimated to be 14,000-16,000 (2001).	
Hose's palm civet (Hose's civet)	Diplogale hosei	9,500	VU	▼	Value given is estimate for mature individuals.	
Black-footed cat	Felis nigripes	9,707	VU	▼	Total population is estimated to be 13,867 individuals.	
Hoary fox	Lycalopex vetulus	9,840-19,200	NT	▼	Total population is estimated to be 49,200-96,000 individuals.	
Bourlon's genet	Genetta bourloni	9,850	VU	▼	Known from a single camera-trap photo and 29 museum specimens.	
Galápagos fur seal	Arctocephalus galapagoensis	10,000	EN	▼	Total population is estimated to be 15,000 individuals.	
Aquatic genet	Genetta piscivora	10,000	NT	▼	Known from 30 specimens. No confirmed reports since the 1970s.	
Guadalupe fur seal	Arctocephalus townsendi	10,000	LC	▲	Minimum total population is estimated to be 20,084 individuals.	
Pale fox	Vulpes pallida	10,000-19,999	LC	?	Values given are estimate of mature population, though this estimate may not be founded in empirical data.	
Sloth bear	Melursus ursinus	10,000-20,000	VU	▼	Values given are for total population; estimates are considered to be tentative.	
Marbled cat	Pardofelis marmorata	>10,000	NT	▼	Value given is for number of mature individuals, assuming population densities are not exceptionally low across range.	
Sechuran fox	Lycalopex sechurae	< 15,000	NT	?	Value given is for number of mature individuals, but estimate is supported by very little data.	
Juan Fernández fur seal	Arctocephalus philippii	16,000	LC	▲	Value given is for number of mature individuals.	
Maned wolf	Chrysocyon brachyurus	17,000	NT	?	Total population is estimated to be 17,000 individuals.	
Leopard seal	Hydrurga leptonyx	18,000	LC	?	Total population is estimated to be 35,500 (95% confidence interval: 10,900-102,600) individuals.	
Polar bear	Ursus maritimus	22,000-31,000	VU	?	Values given are for total population. Best estimate for total population is 26,000 individuals.	
Lion	Panthera leo	22,670-25,670	VU	▼	Values given are estimates for number of adults and subadults.	
Kodkod (Guiña)	Leopardus guigna	26,383-101,294	LC	?	Values given are for number of mature individuals.	
Spotted hyena (Spotted hyaena)	Crocuta crocuta	27,000–47,000	LC	▼	Values given are a tentative estimate of total population.	
Tibetan fox	Vulpes ferrilata	37,000	LC	?	Value given is for total population, but is from 1989 and considered to be "very coarse and unreliable."	
Ross seal	Ommatophoca rossii	40,000	LC	?	Estimates for total population are highly variable. Most recent estimate (2012) estimates 78,500 total individuals.	
Asian black bear (Asiatic black bear)	Ursus thibetanus	50,000-61,000	VU	▼	Values given are estimate of total population is the four countries with the largest populations (China, Japan, India, and Russia). Likely to be a considerable underestimate, given known populations across south and east Asia.	
Baikal seal	Pusa sibirica	54,000	LC	Steady	Total population is estimated to be 108,200 individuals.	
Pallas's cat	Otocolobus manul	58,000	LC	▼	Total population is speculated to be 49,000–98,000 individuals.	
Jaguar	Panthera onca	64,000	NT	▼	Value given is for total population. A single large population in Amazonia is estimated to account for 89% of total population, with 57,000 individuals.	
Caspian seal	Pusa caspica	68,000	EN	?	Value given is for mature individuals. Total population is highly uncertain.	
Eurasian lynx	Lynx lynx	>69,510	LC	Steady	Value given is an underestimate of total population, due to unknown populations across large portions of the species' Asian range. National/regional population estimates are available for Europe, Russia, China, and Mongolia.	
Steller sea lion	Eumetopias jubatus	81,327	NT	▲	Total population is estimated to be 160,867 individuals. Divided by subspecies: Western (79,929); Loughlin's (80,938).	
New Zealand fur seal	Arctocephalus forsteri	100,000	LC	▲	Total population is estimated to be 200,000 individuals.	
South American fur seal	Arctocephalus australis	109,500	LC	▲	Total population is estimated to be 219,000 individuals.	
Bush dog	Speothos venaticus	110,000	NT	▼	Value given is for total population; may be an overestimate.	
Northern elephant seal	Mirounga angustirostris	110,000	LC	▲	Total population is estimated to be 210,000-239,000 individuals.	
Brown bear	Ursus arctos	110,000	LC	Steady	Total population is estimated to be more than 200,000 individuals. Regional estimates exist for several areas: Russia: >100,000; United States: 33,000; Canada: 25,000; Europe (excluding Russia): 15,400.	
Walrus	Odobenus rosmarus	112,500	VU	?	Total population is estimated to be more than 245,000-295,000 individuals, in two subspecies: Pacific (O. r. divergens): 200,000-250,000; Atlantic (O. r. rosmarus): >45,000	
Sea otter	Enhydra lutris	128,902	EN	▼	Value given is for total population.	
Leopard	Panthera pardus	146,768- 461,512	VU	▼	Values given are estimate of total population.	
California sea lion	Zalophus californianus	180,000	LC	▲	Total population is estimated to be 387,646 individuals.	
Ribbon seal	Histriophoca fasciata	183,000	LC	?	Total population is estimated to be approximately 365,000 individuals.	
Subantarctic fur seal	Arctocephalus tropicalis	200,000	LC	Steady	Total population is estimated to be more than 400,000 individuals.	
Grey wolf	Canis lupus	200,000-250,000	LC	Steady	Values given are for total population.	
South American sea lion	Otaria flavescens	222,500	LC	Steady	Total population is estimated to be, at least, 445,000 individuals. IUCN gives binomial name as Otaria byronia.	
Weddell seal	Leptonychotes weddellii	300,000	LC	?	Species is widespread and range is difficult to cover in a survey. Total population is estimated to be between 200,000 and 1.0 million individuals.	
Arctic fox	Vulpes lagopus	300,000-999,999	LC	Steady	Total population is estimated to number "several hundred thousand animals," with population fluctuating significantly with prey populations.	
Harbor seal	Phoca vitulina	315,000	LC	?	Total population is estimated to be 610,000-640,000 individuals.	
Grey seal	Halichoerus grypus	316,000	LC	▲	Total population is estimated to be 632,000 individuals.	
Hooded seal	Cystophora cristata	316,832	EN	▼	Value given is estimated total population from two subpopulations: Northeast Atlantic: 76,832 individuals; Northwest Atlantic: 240,000 individuals, assuming decline of 60% from 2005.	
Spotted seal	Phoca largha	320,000	LC	?	Total population has not been well quantified, but may be between 400,000-640,000 individuals.	
Southern elephant seal	Mirounga leonina	325,000	LC	Steady	Total population is estimated to be 650,000 individuals, ca. mid 1990s.	
Northern fur seal	Callorhinus ursinus	650,000	VU	▼	Total population is estimated to be 1.29 million individuals.	
Antarctic fur seal	Arctocephalus gazella	700,000-1,000,000	LC	▼	Values given are for mature individuals.	
American black bear	Ursus americanus	850,000–950,000	LC	▲	Values given are for total population.	
Brown fur seal (Afro-Australian fur seal)	Arctocephalus pusillus	1,060,000	LC	▲	Divided into two subspecies: Cape (A. p. pusillus) and Australian (A. p. doriferus).	
Ringed seal	Pusa hispida	1,500,000	LC	?	Value given is for mature individuals. Mature populations for subspecies are estimated to be: Arctic (P. h. huspida): 1.45 million; Okhotsk (P. h. ochotensis): 44,000; Baltic (P. h. botnica): 11,500; Ladoga (P. h. ladogensis): 3,000-4,500; Saimma (P. h. saimensis): 135-190	
Bobcat	Lynx rufus	2,352,276 - 3,571,681	LC	Steady	Values given are total population for species range in the United States. Population is certainly much larger, considering sizeable population also exist in Canada and Mexico.	
Crabeater seal	Lobodon carcinophaga	4,000,000	LC	?	Value given is for number of mature individuals. Most recent estimate of total population (1980s - 1990s) yielded an estimate of 9.5 million individuals.	
Harp seal	Pagophilus groenlandicus	7,000,000	NT	▼	Value given is for total population.	
Cat (domestic)	Felis catus	600,000,000	Domesticated	▲	2007 estimate	
Dog (domestic)	Canis familiaris	900,000,000	Domesticated	▲		

== Species without population estimates ==
Common name	Binomial name	Population	Status	Trend	Notes	Image
Red panda	Ailurus fulgens	unknown	EN	▼	Four different attempts have been made in the 21st century to estimate population for this species, but results are highly divergent and do not account for total range.	
Marine otter	Lontra felina	unknown	EN	▼	Difficulty in accurately surveying this species has led to IUCN not giving a population estimate in its most recent assessment. However, Peruvian subpopulation is estimated to be 800–2,000 total individuals.	
Narrow-striped mongoose (bokiboky)	Mungotictis decemlineata	unknown	EN	▼	The nominate subspecies, M. d. decemlineata, was estimated to have a population of 8,400 – 12,050 adults circa 2006. The population of subspecies M. d. lineata has not been quantified.	
African golden cat	Caracal aurata	unknown	VU	▼		
Bearded seal	Erignathus barbatus	unknown	NT	?	Total population is estimated to be roughly 400,000–500,000 individuals in the Pacific Arctic, but not enough is known to make robust estimates across the rest of its range.	
Rusty-spotted cat	Prionailurus rubiginosus	unknown	NT	▼	Not enough data exist to estimate almost anything about this species.	
Yellow-throated marten	Martes flavigula	unknown	LC	▼	The population in Russia, a very small part of its range, was estimated to be 2,500-3,500 individuals circa 2006. Across the rest of its range, population is unquantified.	
Cougar (Puma)	Puma concolor	unknown	LC	▼	Estimates exist for some parts of the species' range, though the largest subpopulation in South America has not been quantified: Canada: 3,500–5,000 individuals; Western U.S.: 10,000 individuals; Florida: 100–180 individuals	
American badger	Taxidea taxus	unknown	LC	▼	Total population in the United States has been estimated to be "several hundred thousand," and population in Canada was estimated to be 17,700–43,900 individuals in 2002. Mexican population is unknown.	
Red fox	Vulpes vulpes	unknown	LC	▲	Global population is unknown. Population on Great Britain is estimated to be 357,000.	

== See also ==
- Lists of organisms by population
- Lists of mammals by population
