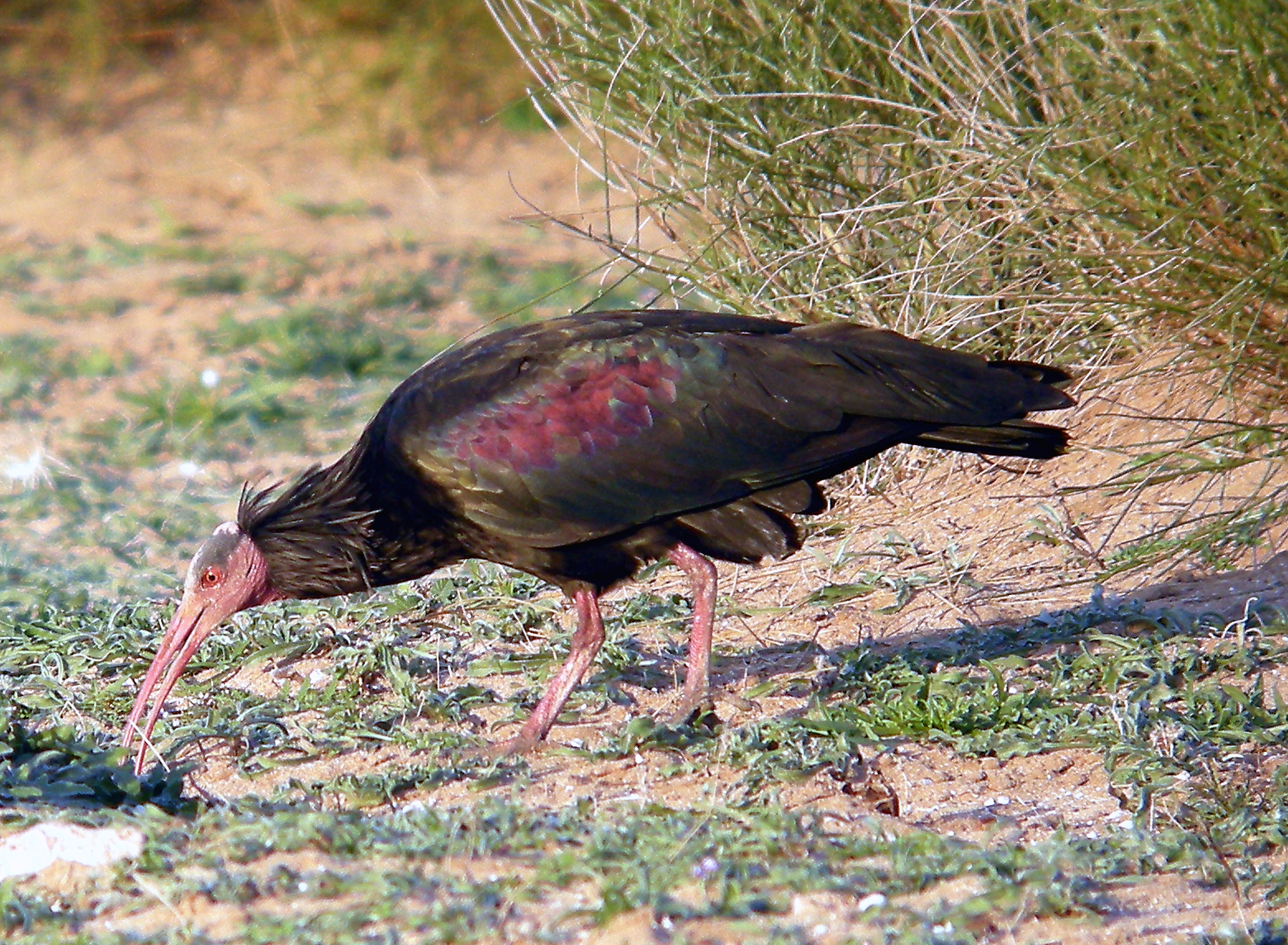
- At Tamri, Morocco

Conservation status
- Endangered (IUCN 3.1)
- CITES Appendix I

Scientific classification
- Kingdom: Animalia
- Phylum: Chordata
- Class: Aves
- Order: Pelecaniformes
- Family: Threskiornithidae
- Genus: Geronticus
- Species: G. eremita

Binomial name
- Geronticus eremita (Linnaeus, 1758)
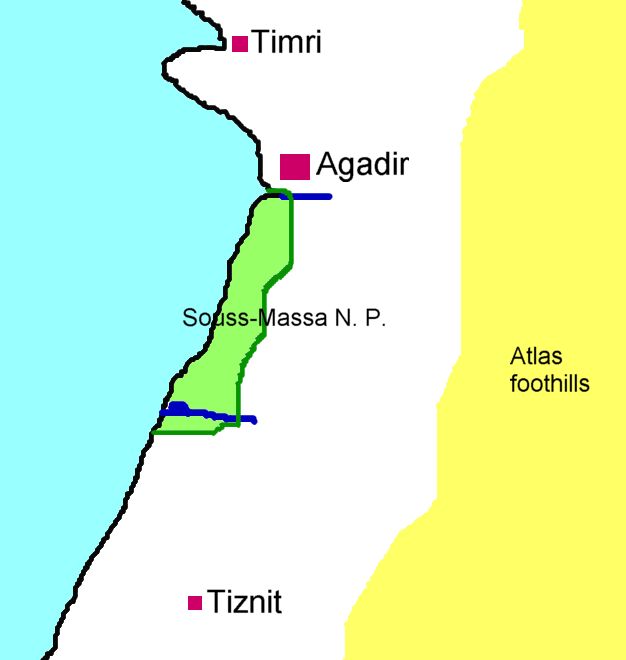
- Map showing location of remaining colonies in Morocco

= Northern bald ibis =

Endangered migratory bird

The northern bald ibis, hermit ibis, or Waldrapp (Geronticus eremita) is a migratory Old World ibis found in open areas such as grasslands, rocky mountains, and semi-deserts, often close to running water. This 70–80 cm (28–31 in) glossy black ibis, which, unlike many members of the ibis family, is non-wading, has an unfeathered red face and head, and a long, curved red bill. It breeds colonially on coastal or mountain cliff ledges, where it typically lays two to three eggs in a stick nest, and feeds on lizards, insects, and other small animals.

The northern bald ibis was once widespread across the Middle East, northern Africa, southern and central Europe, with a fossil record dating back at least 1.8 million years. It disappeared from Europe over 300 years ago, although reintroduction programmes in the region are underway. In 2019 there were about 700 wild birds remaining in southern Morocco.

To combat these low numbers, reintroduction programs have been instituted internationally in recent times, with a semi-wild breeding colony in Turkey which counted almost 250 birds in 2018 as well as sites in Austria, Italy, Spain, and northern Morocco. There are about 2000 northern bald ibises living in captivity. These programmes and the natural growth in Morocco from about 200 birds in the 1990s helped to downlist the northern bald ibis from Critically Endangered to Endangered on the IUCN Red List in 2018. The down-listing of conservation status for the species has been described as controversial decision and not taking fully into account the recent extinction in the wild of the genetically distinct and only long-range migratory population that used to breed in the Middle East and wintering in Eastern Africa.

The long-term decline in Europe has been linked to hunting and use as food, especially the fledglings. The slow reproduction means this can cause local extinction.

== Taxonomy ==
The ibises are gregarious, long-legged wading birds with long down-curved bills. Along with the spoonbills they form one subfamily within the family Threskiornithidae. The northern bald ibis' closest relative, and the only other member of the genus, is the southern bald ibis, G. alvus, of southern Africa. The two Geronticus species differ from other ibises in that they have unfeathered faces and heads, breed on cliffs rather than in trees, and prefer arid habitats to the wetlands used by their relatives.

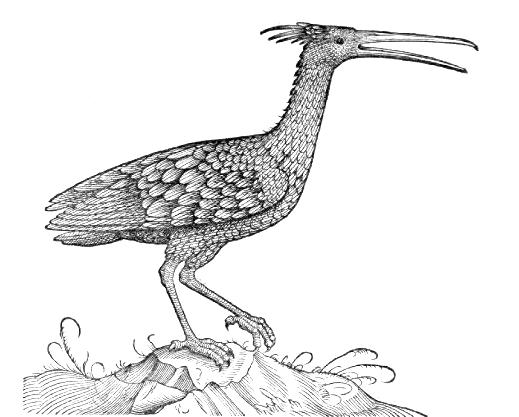
Gesner's 1555 woodcut of the northern bald ibis

The northern bald ibis was described and illustrated by Swiss naturalist Conrad Gessner in his Historiae animalium in 1555, and given the binomial name Upupa eremita by Carl Linnaeus in his 1758 Systema Naturae. It was moved to its current genus by the German herpetologist Johann Georg Wagler in 1832. This species has an interesting history of description, oblivion and rediscovery.

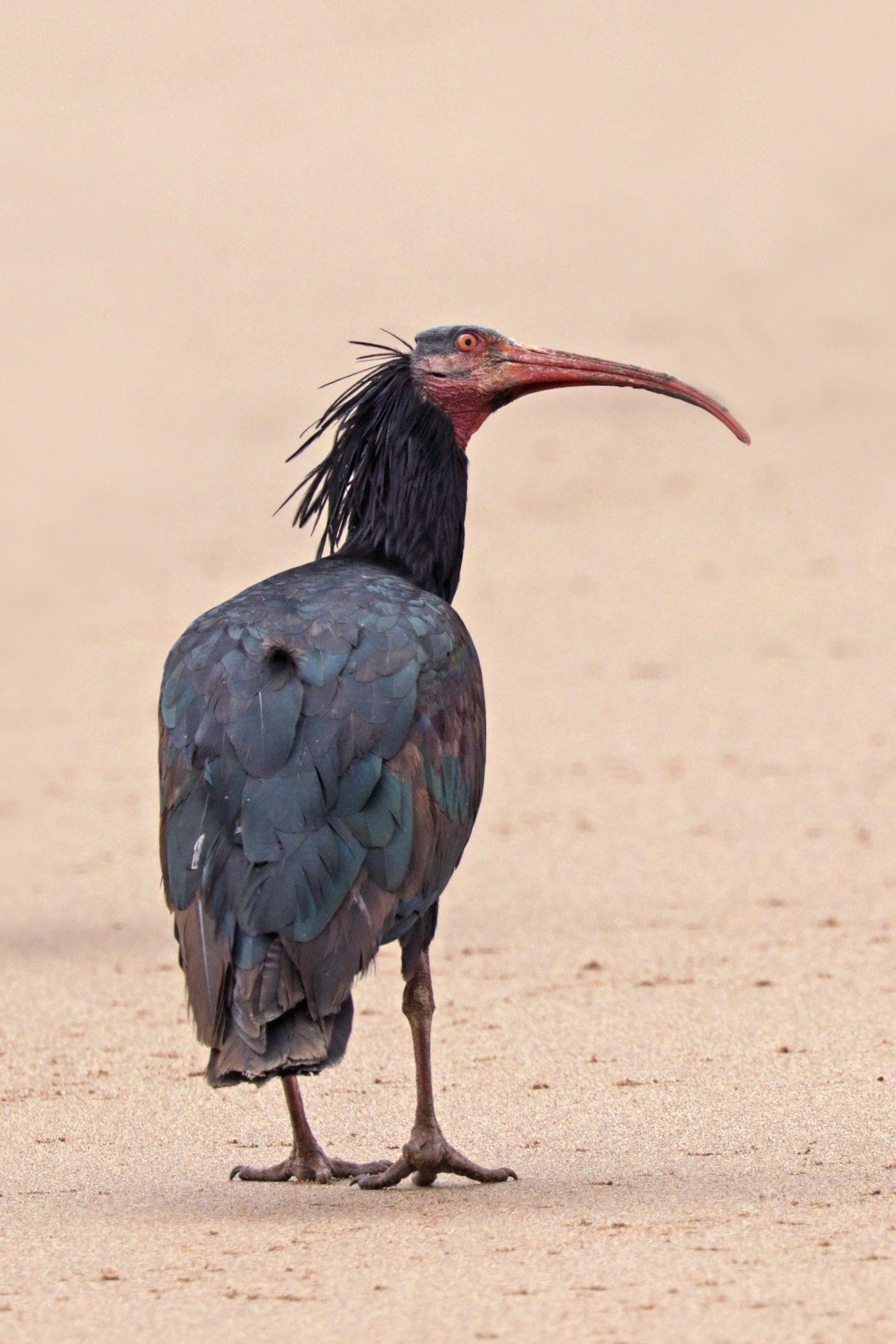
Wild ibis in Souss-Massa National Park, Morocco

The species probably split into two distinct populations at least 400 years ago and, since then, the two populations have been diverging morphologically, ecologically, and genetically; nevertheless, the Turkish and Moroccan populations of this ibis are not currently classed as separate subspecies. One consistent difference between the eastern and western birds is a single mutation in the cytochrome b gene of their mitochondrial DNA.

Fossils of the northern bald ibis have been found at a Holocene (c. 10,000 years ago) site in southern France, in middle Pleistocene (c. 900,000 years ago) strata in Sicily, and in Pliocene-Pleistocene boundary (c. 1.8 million years ago) deposits on the Mediterranean coast of Spain. What appears to be an ancestral form, Geronticus balcanicus, was found in the late Pliocene of Bulgaria, further illustrating the early widespread presence of this genus in Europe, and suggesting that Geronticus eremita may have originated in southeastern Europe or the Middle East.

== Etymology ==
The genus name, Geronticus, is derived from the Ancient Greek γέρων : gérōn, meaning old man and refers to the bald head of the aged. The species name eremita is Late Latin for hermit, from the Ancient Greek: ἐρημία : erēmía, meaning desert, and refers to the arid habitats inhabited by this species. The alternative common name Waldrapp is German for forest raven, the equivalent of the Latin Corvo sylvatico of Gesner, adapted as Corvus sylvaticus by Linnaeus.

== Description ==
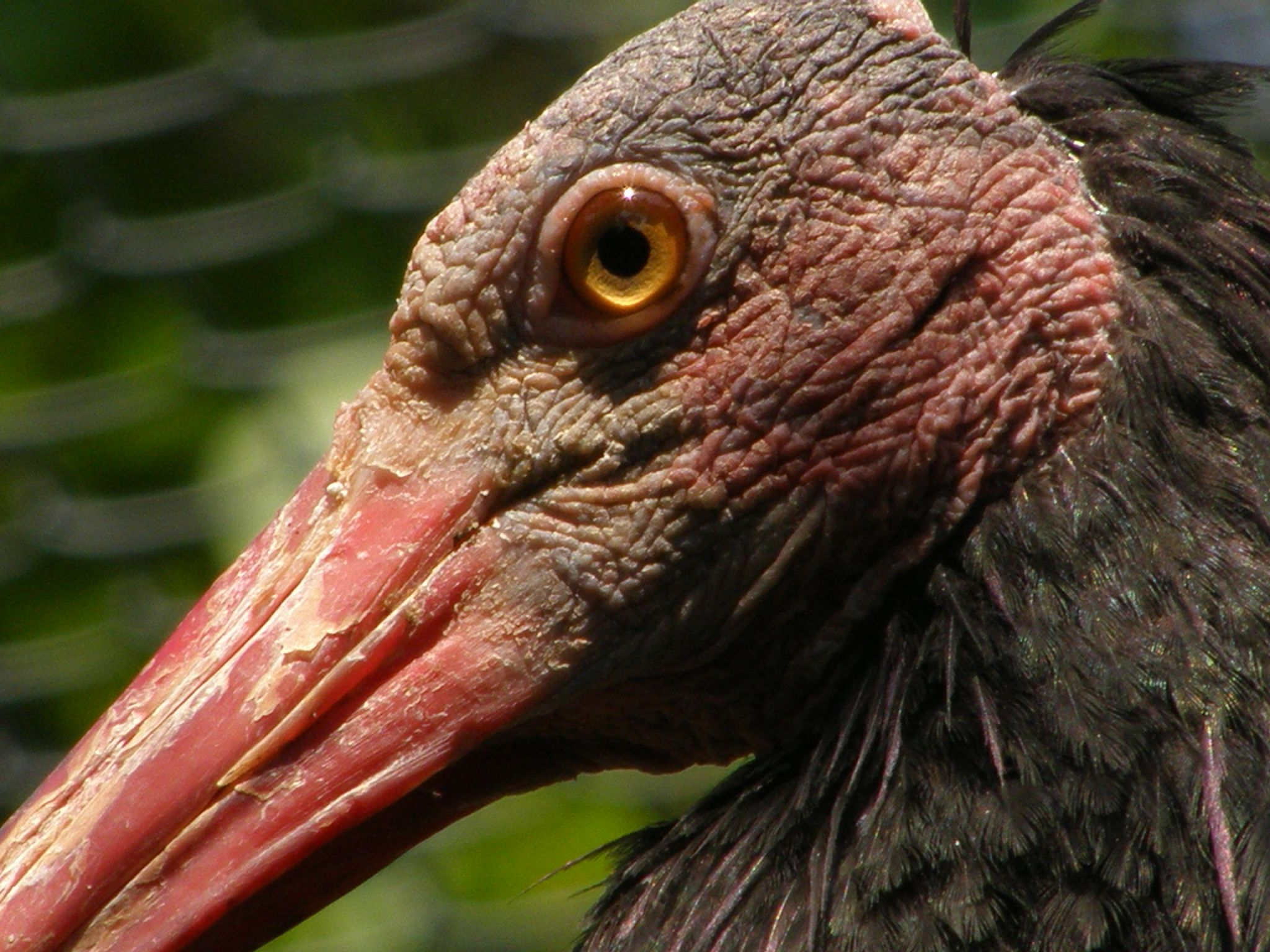
Close-up of an adult's head

The northern bald ibis is a large, glossy black bird, 70–80 cm (28–31 in) long with a 125–135 cm (49–53 in) wingspan and an average weight of 1.0–1.3 kg (35–46 oz). The plumage is black, with bronze-green and violet iridescence, and there is a wispy ruff on the bird's hind neck. The face and head are dull red and unfeathered, and the long, curved bill and the legs are red. In flight, this bird has powerful, shallow, and flexible wing beats. It gives guttural hrump and high, hoarse hyoh calls at its breeding colonies, but is otherwise silent.

The sexes are similar in plumage, although males are generally larger than females, and, as with other ibises that breed in colonies, have longer bills. The longer-billed males are more successful in attracting a mate. The downy chick has uniformly pale brown plumage, and the fledged juvenile resembles the adult except that it has a dark head, light grey legs, and a pale bill. The unfeathered areas of the young bird's head and neck gradually become red as it matures. Moroccan birds have a significantly longer bill than Turkish birds of the same sex.

Population	Male bill length	Female bill length
Morocco	141.1 mm (5.56 in)	133.5 mm (5.26 in)
Turkey	129.0 mm (5.08 in)	123.6 mm (4.87 in)

If the eastern and western populations are considered to be separable subspecies, it is unclear which should be considered to be the nominate (first-named) form, since the first description of this species was based on a now-extinct population from Switzerland which is of unknown race.

The northern bald ibis is readily distinguished from its close relative, the southern bald ibis of Southern Africa, by the southern species' whitish face. The northern bald can also be confused with the similarly dark-plumaged glossy ibis, which overlaps its range, but it is larger and stockier than that species. In flight, when the bill and face colouration may not be visible, the bald ibis' less rounded wings and shorter neck give it a different profile from glossy ibis, and its relatively short legs mean that its feet do not project beyond the tail, unlike those of the glossy ibis.

== Habitat and range ==
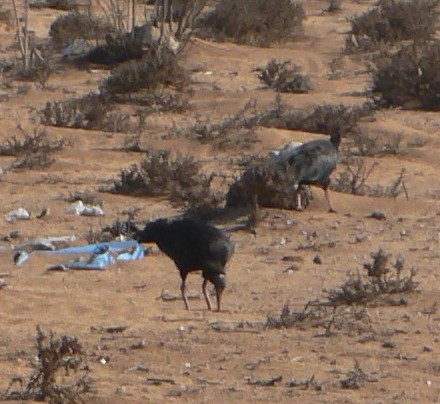
Part of a flock in the Souss Massa stronghold

Unlike many other ibises, which nest in trees and feed in wetlands, the northern bald ibis breeds on undisturbed cliff ledges, and forages for food in irregularly cultivated, grazed dry areas such as semi-arid steppes, and fallow fields. The close proximity of adequate steppe feeding areas to breeding cliffs is an important habitat requirement.

The northern bald ibis was once widespread across the Middle East, northern Africa, and southern and central Europe; fossil bones have been found at Solothurn dated to the Mesolithic and Neolithic Periods. It bred along the Danube and Rhone Rivers, and in the mountains of Spain, Italy, Germany, Austria and Switzerland (Gessner's original description was of a Swiss bird), and most probably also in the Upper Adriatic region. It used castle battlements as well as cliff ledges for nesting before vanishing from Europe at least three centuries ago. It is also extinct over most of its former range, and now almost the entirety of the wild breeding population of just over 500 birds is in Morocco, at Souss-Massa National Park, where there are three documented colonies, and near the mouth of the Oued Tamri (north of Agadir), where there is a single colony containing almost half the Moroccan breeding population. There is some movement of birds between these two sites.

Religious traditions helped this species to survive in one Turkish colony long after the species had disappeared from Europe, since it was believed that the ibis migrated each year to guide Hajj pilgrims to Mecca. The ibis was protected by its religious significance, and a festival was held annually to celebrate its return north. The Turkish ibis population was centred near the small town of Birecik in the southeast of the country, and during the first half of the 20th century, the Birecik colony maintained a relatively stable population of about 500 breeding pairs, reaching an estimated total population of about 3,000 around 1930. By the 1970s, numbers had drastically declined and a captive breeding program was initiated in 1977 with one adult pair and nine chicks taken from the wild. This program largely failed to revert the decline; there were 400 birds in 1982, five pairs in 1986, and seven pairs in 1987. Only three birds returned from their wintering grounds in 1989, and just one in 1990. The returning birds died before they could reproduce, thus rendering the species extinct in the wild in Turkey as of 1992. Once the wild Turkish population became non-viable, the colony was maintained as a flock which was free-flying for most of the year but caged in autumn to prevent migration.

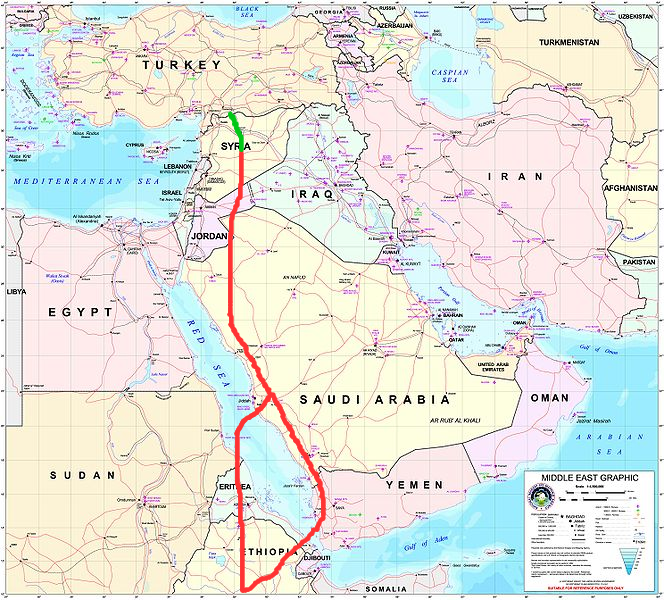
—Tagged Syrian breeders migrated south through Yemen in 2006 and returned via Eritrea. —Birds from Birecik visited the Syrian colony at Palmyra.

After the demise of the migratory Turkish colony, the northern bald ibis was known to survive in the wild only at the Moroccan sites, although occasional sightings of birds in Yemen, Eritrea, Saudi Arabia, and Israel during the 1980s and 1990s suggested that there was still a colony somewhere in the Middle East. Intensive field surveys in spring 2002, based on the knowledge of Bedouin nomads and local hunters, revealed that the species had never become completely extinct on the Syrian desert steppes. Following systematic searches, 15 old nesting sites were found, one, near Palmyra, was still hosting an active breeding colony of seven individuals. Although the ibis had been declared extinct in Syria more than 70 years earlier, the bird appears to have been relatively common in the desert areas until 20 years ago, when a combination of overexploitation of its range lands and increasing hunting pressures initiated a dramatic decline.

The Moroccan breeding birds are resident, dispersing along the coast after the nesting season. It has been suggested that coastal fog provides extra moisture for this population, and enables the ibises to remain year-round. In the rest of its former range, away from the Moroccan coastal locations, the northern bald ibis migrated south for the winter, and formerly occurred as a vagrant to Spain, Iraq, Egypt, the Azores, and Cape Verde.

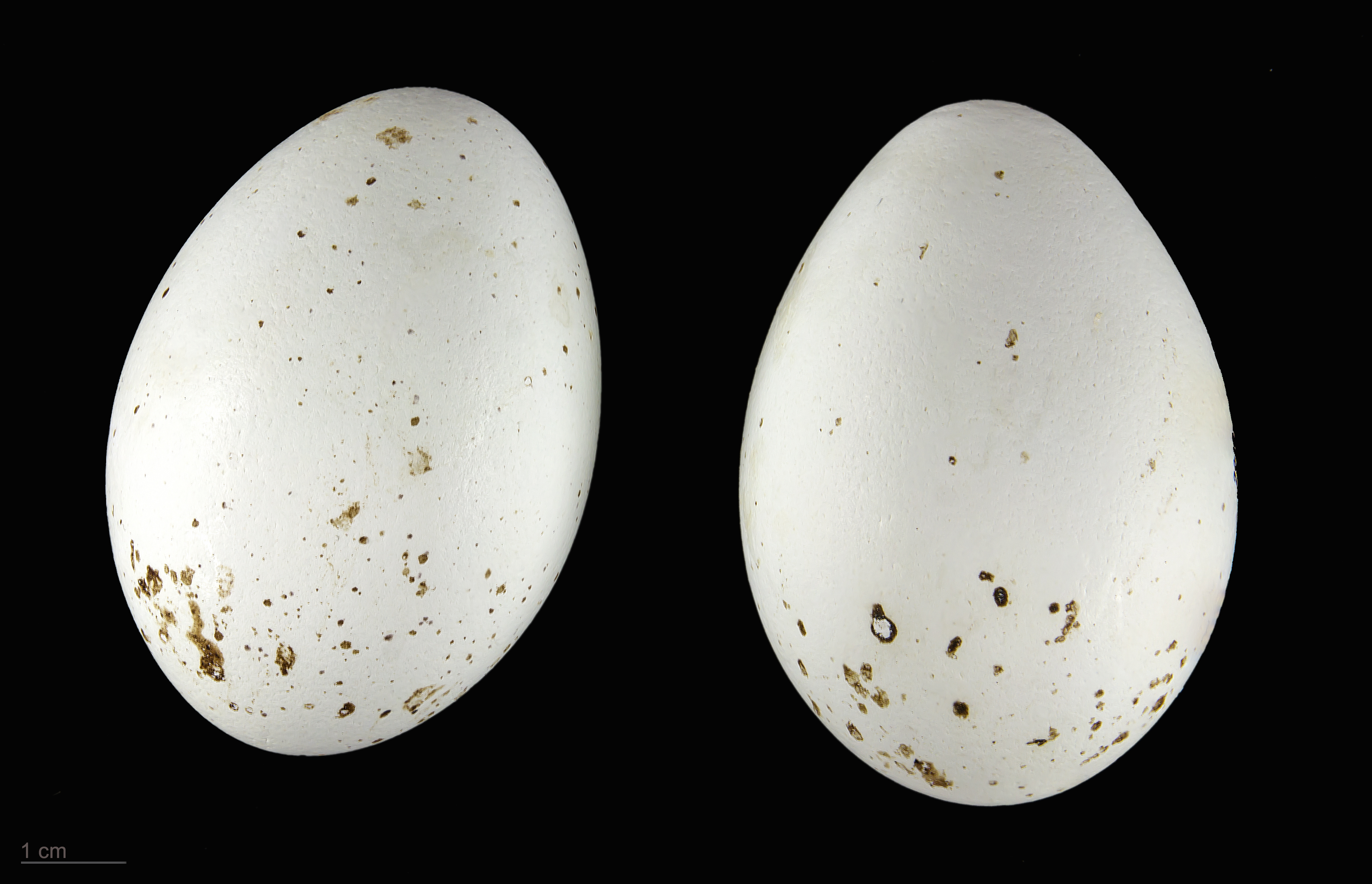
Geronticus eremita - MHNT

Satellite tagging of 13 Syrian birds in 2006 showed that the three adults in the group, plus a fourth untagged adult, wintered together from February to July in the highlands of Ethiopia, where the species had not been recorded for nearly 30 years. They travelled south on the eastern side of the Red Sea via Saudi Arabia and Yemen, and returned north through Sudan and Eritrea.

== Behaviour ==
=== Breeding ===
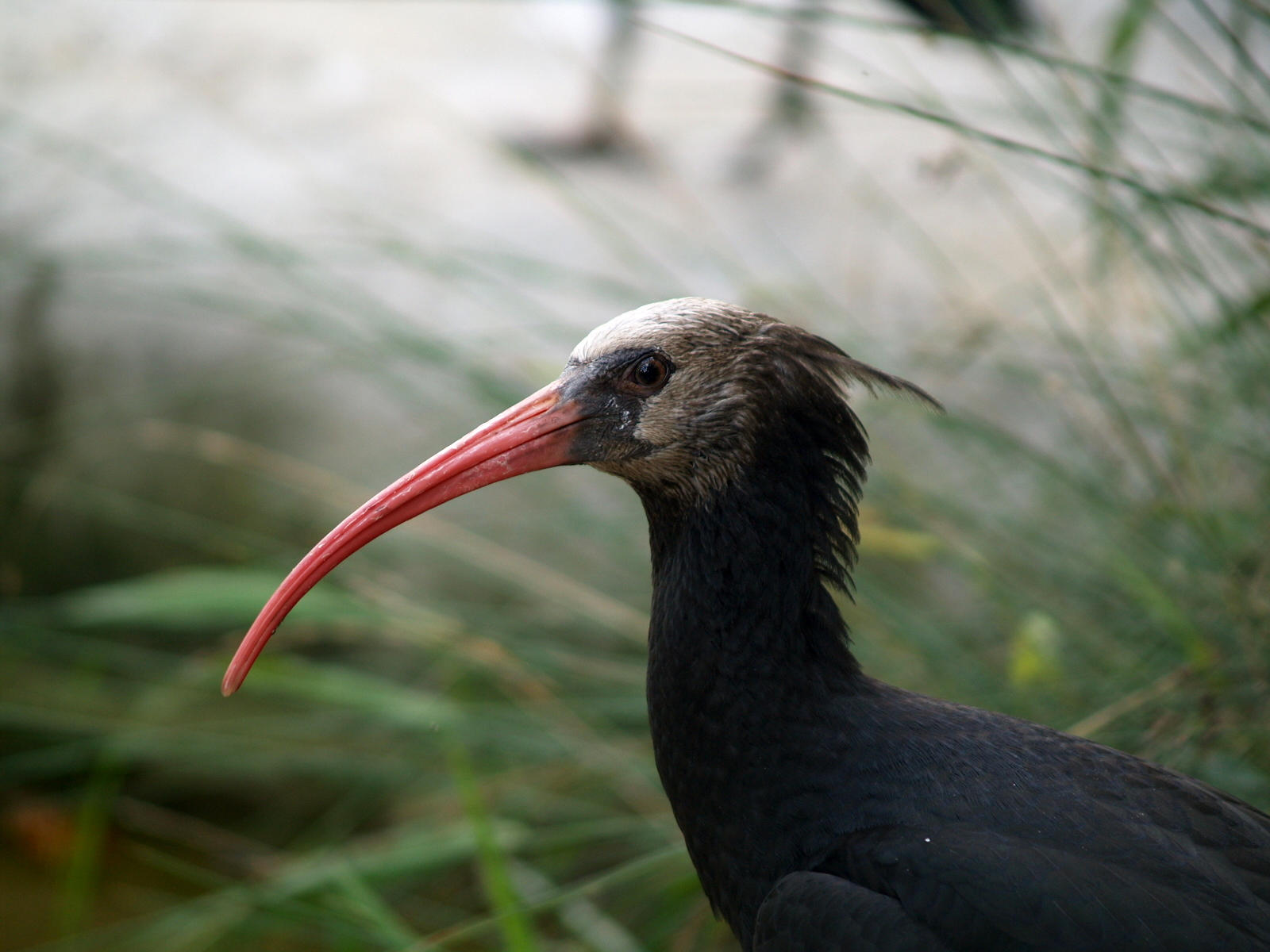
A young bird

The northern bald ibis breeds in loosely spaced colonies, nesting on cliff ledges or amongst boulders on steep slopes. Volunteer climbers have created extra ledge spaces in the Souss-Massa colonies to ensure that breeding population is not limited by the availability of nest ledges, and artificial nest boxes are used in the managed colony at Birecik. In the past, the birds also nested in buildings.

This ibis starts breeding at three to five years of age, and pairs for life. The male chooses a nest site, cleans it, and then advertises for a female by waving his crest and giving low rumbling calls. Once the birds have paired, the bond is reinforced through bowing displays and mutual preening. The nest is a loose construction of twigs lined with grass or straw. G. eremita normally lays two to four rough-surfaced eggs, which weigh an average of 50.16 g (1.769 oz), and are initially blue-white with brown spots, becoming brown during incubation. An egg in the collection of the British Museum was marked more thickly at the broad end, with "spots and very small blotches of yellowish brown and pale rufous". It was 0.93 in long and 0.68 in wide (2.37 × 1.73 cm). The clutch is incubated for 24–25 days to hatching, the chicks fledge in another 40–50 days and the first flight takes place at about two months. Both parents incubate and feed the chicks.

The northern bald ibis lives for an average of 20 to 25 years in captivity (oldest recorded male 37 years, oldest recorded female 30 years). The average age in the wild has been estimated as 10 to 15 years.

=== Feeding ===
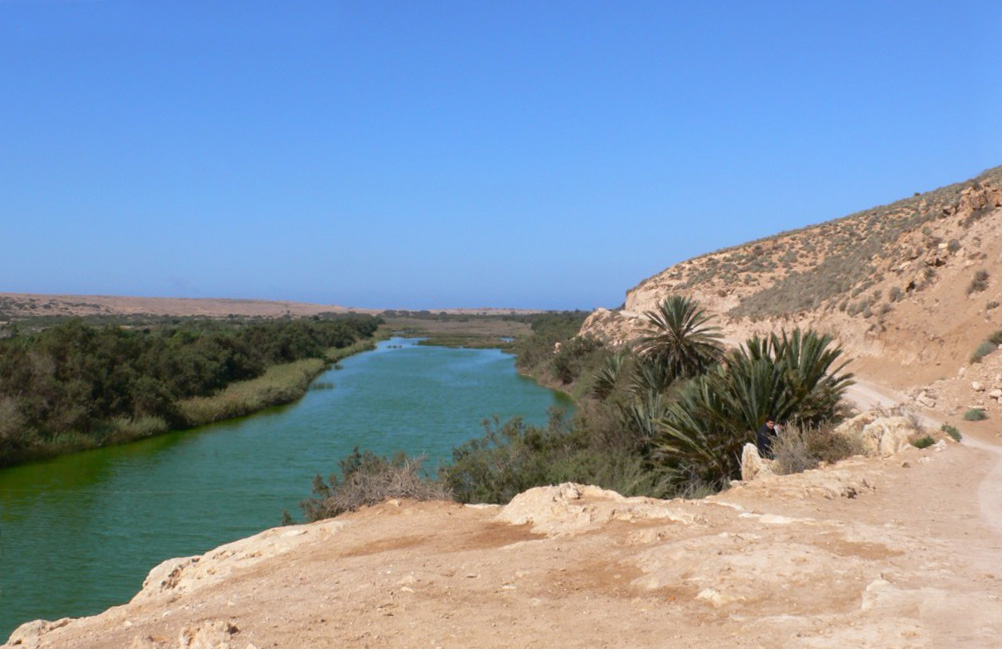
The steppes around the Oued Massa are favoured feeding areas.

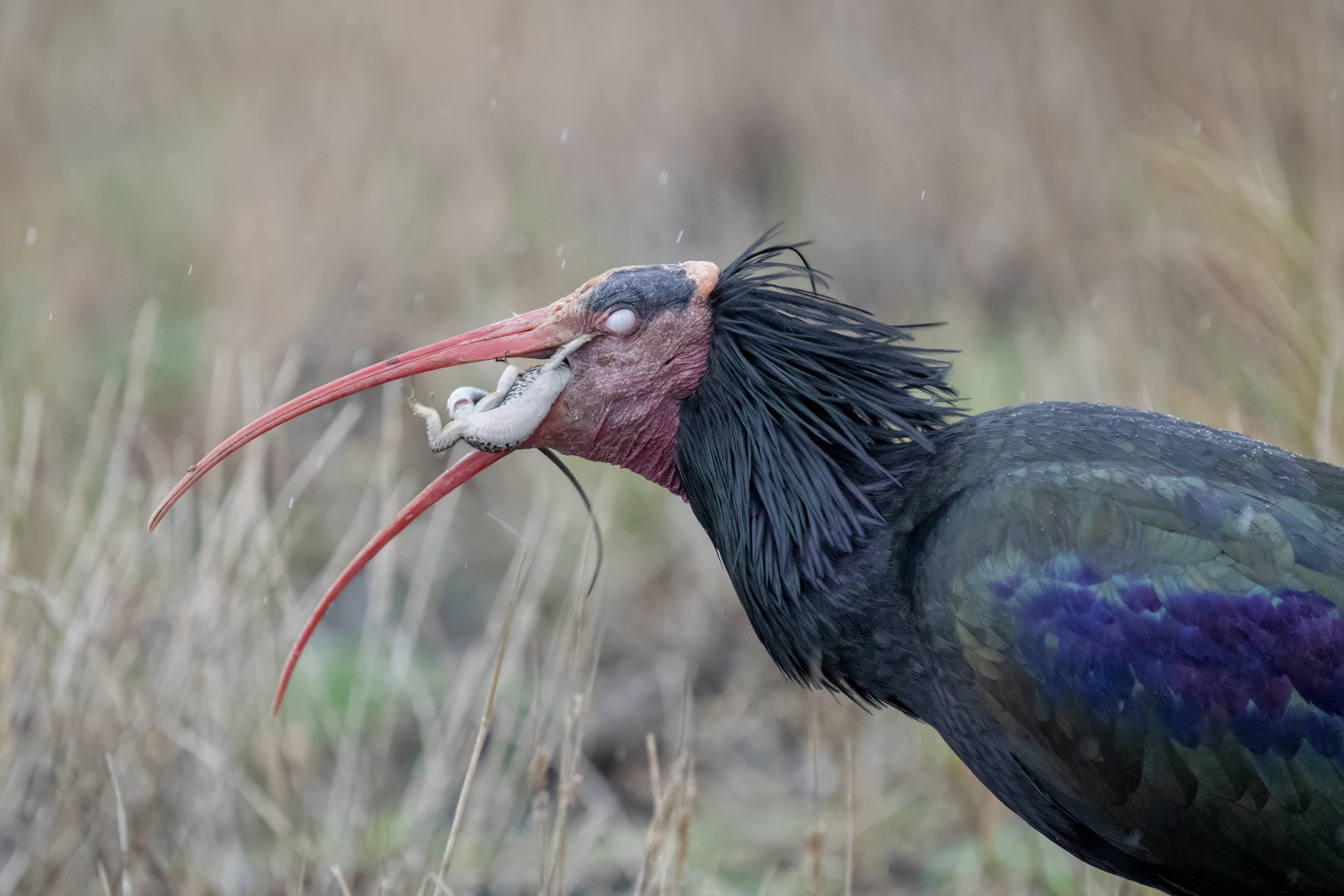
Eating an Italian wall lizard, in Rome

This gregarious species commutes in flocks from the cliff breeding sites or winter roosts to its feeding areas, flying in a V formation. The flocks may contain up to 100 birds in winter. During the breeding season, the ibises regularly forage up to 15 km (9.3 mi) from the colony, and, although steppe not in current cultivation is preferred for feeding, they will also use fallow ground, and occasionally even actively cultivated fields.

The northern bald ibis consumes a very wide variety of mainly animal food; faecal analysis of the Moroccan and Syrian breeding population has shown that lizards and tenebrionid beetles predominate in the diet, although small mammals, ground-nesting birds, and invertebrates such as snails, scorpions, spiders, and caterpillars are also taken. Males will sometimes "scrounge" food from females. As the flock moves across the ground, the ibis uses its long bill to feel for food items in the loose, sandy soil. Since this bird hunts mainly by probing, a soft surface seems to be vital, and it is important that any vegetation is sparse, and not more than 15–20 cm (6–8 in) high.

== Conservation status ==
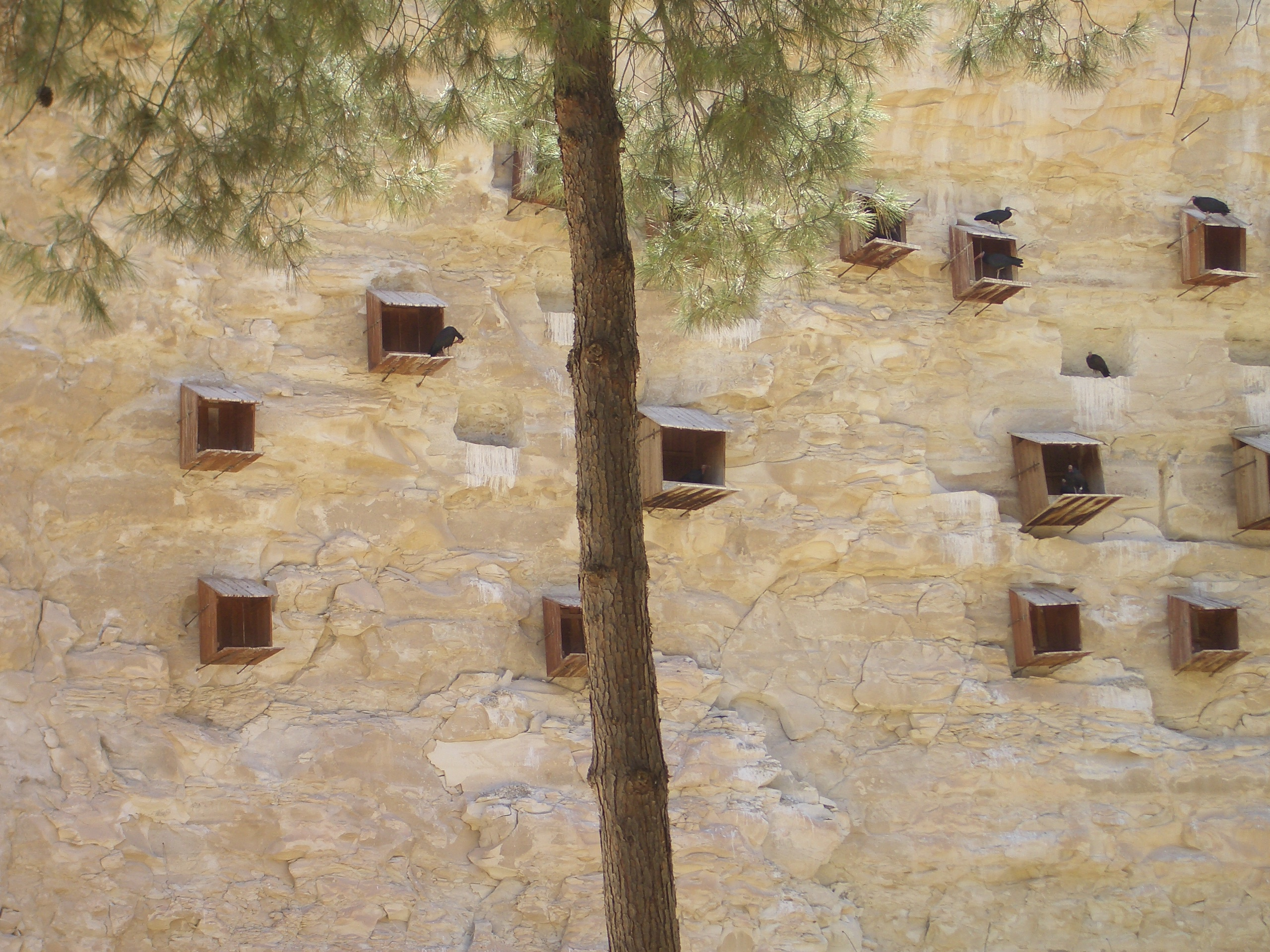
Artificial nests at the Birecik colony

Although the northern bald ibis was long extinct in Europe, many colonies in Morocco and Algeria survived until the early 20th century, when they began to decline more rapidly, the last colony in Algeria disappearing in the late 1980s. In Morocco there were about 38 colonies in 1940 and 15 in 1975, but the last migratory populations in the Atlas Mountains had vanished by 1989. The species is endangered according to the IUCN scale, with an estimated population in 2018 of around 147 breeding pairs in the wild and over 1,000 in captivity. It was formerly considered critically endangered until heavy conservation action secured the breeding sites in Morocco and even allowed the birds to expand to other sites, as well as the semi-wild population conserved in Turkey as well as the reintroduction projects in Europe. The down-listing of conservation status for the species was a controversial decision that did not take fully into account the recent extinction in the wild of the genetically unique and only long-range migratory population that used to breed in the Middle East and wintering in Eastern Africa.

The northern bald ibis is one of the key species to which the draft Agreement on the Conservation of African-Eurasian Migratory Waterbirds (AEWA) applies, and it has a detailed, internationally agreed conservation action plan under the agreement. As a species that is threatened with extinction, it is listed on Appendix 1 of CITES (the Convention on International Trade in Endangered Species of Wild Fauna and Flora), which means that commercial trade in the species (including parts and derivatives) is prohibited.

The northern bald ibis has declined for several centuries, at least partly as a consequence of unidentified natural causes. The more rapid decline in the past hundred years, with a loss of 98% of the population between 1900 and 2002, is the result of a combination of factors. These include significant human persecution, especially hunting, and also the loss of steppe and non-intensive agricultural areas (particularly in Morocco), pesticide poisoning, disturbance, and dam construction.

The tracking of adults and chicks migrating southward from Syria enabled to clarify that electrocution, together with uncontrolled hunting, along the migratory flyway was a key threat explaining the low or zero recruitment at the Syrian colony. The discovery in Jordan of three dead adults from the Turkish colony seemed to confirm that the overuse of pesticides is still a cause of death on migration. These birds were tracked by satellite after leaving Birecik; they stopped off briefly at the Syrian colony, and were later found dead in the Jordanian desert. Although the cause of death was initially thought to have been from poison, probably laid by chicken farmers to kill rodents, the autopsy revealed that they had actually been electrocuted whilst standing on electricity pylons.

=== Wild populations ===
==== Morocco ====
Monitoring of Moroccan wild population is guaranteed by BirdLife International partners, especially by RSPB, SEO/BirdLife and, recently GREPOM in cooperation with Souss-Massa National Park administration and the support of institutions like Prince Albert II of Monaco Foundation which is the Species Champion for Northern Bald Ibis. For the first time in the species' recorded history, there is now evidence of population growth in the wild, and the population in Morocco increased to 100 breeding pairs in the decade prior to 2008 and reached a record of 113 breeding pairs in 2013. Simple site and species protection has facilitated this growth. Quantitative assessments of the importance of sites for breeding, roosting, and foraging have guided actions to prevent disturbance and the loss of key areas to mass tourism development. Wardening by members of the local community has reduced human intrusion and increased the perceived value of the birds. The provision of drinking water and the removal and deterrence of predators and competitors enhances breeding prospects, and monitoring has confirmed that steppe and two-year fallows are key feeding habitats. In early 2019 the total population in the two colonies of Souss-Massa National Park and Tamri reached 708 birds after 147 breeding pairs that laid eggs have produced 170 chicks in the last breeding season.

Maintaining such non-intensive land uses in the future may present major management challenges, and the recovery in the Souss-Massa region remains precarious because the population is concentrated in just a few places. However, it could provide opportunities for natural extension of the range to formerly occupied sites further north in Morocco.

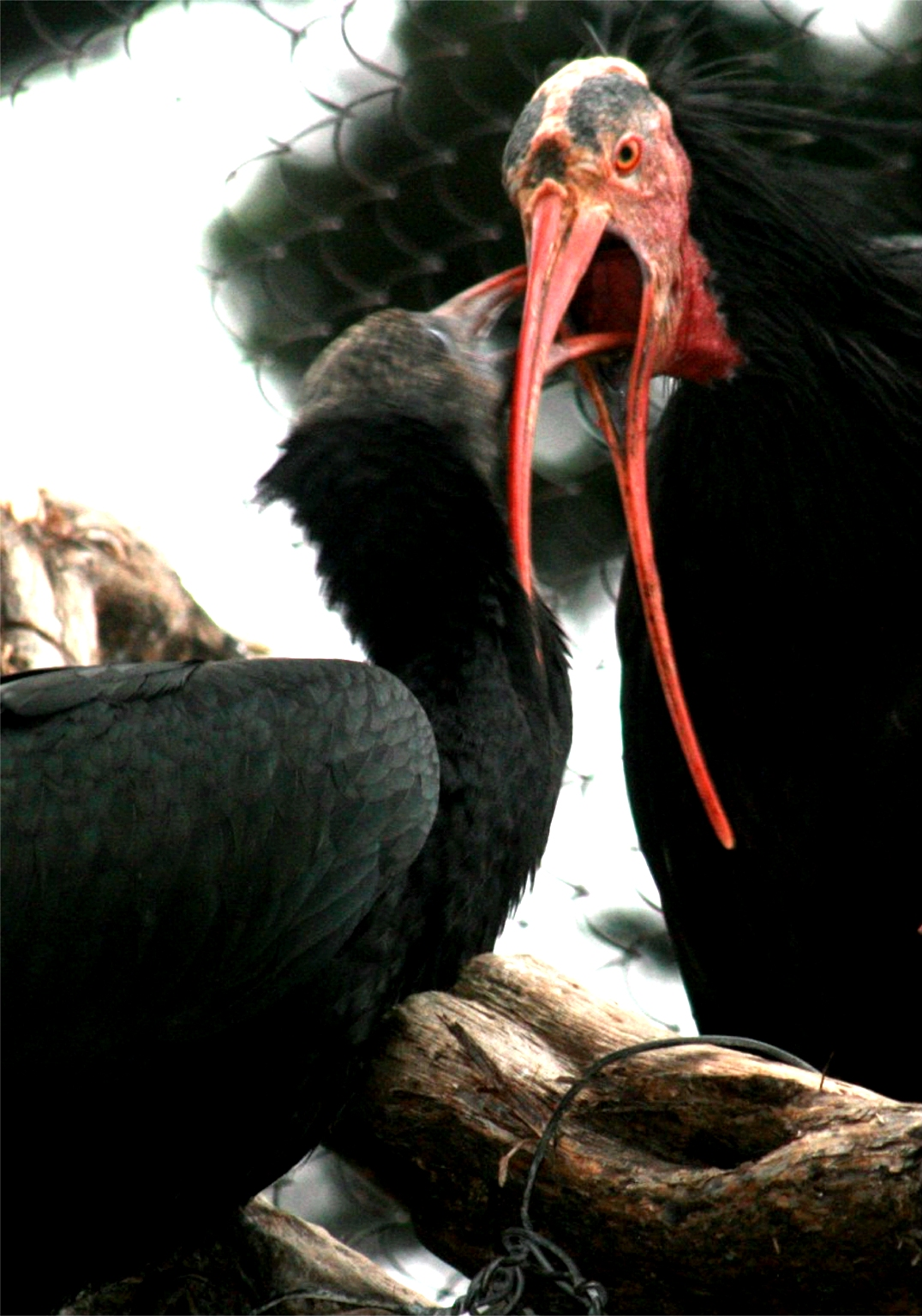
Adult feeding a chick

The main cause of breeding failure at the Souss-Massa National Park is the loss of eggs to predators, especially the common raven which nest monitoring has shown to have had a serious impact at one sub-colony. The effects of predators on adult birds have not been studied, but the very similar southern bald ibis, Geronticus calvus, is hunted by large raptors, particularly those that share its breeding cliffs. There is evidence of chick starvation in some years, but the main threats to breeding birds are human disturbance and the loss of feeding habitat. There was a dramatic mortality incident at the Moroccan colonies in May 1996, when 40 adults died or disappeared over a period of nine days. Although analyses have not identified the cause, an obscure virus, a toxin, or botulism are thought to be the most likely causes of the deaths.

==== Syria ====
Conservation efforts for the northern bald ibis in Syria began with the discovery of an unreported relict colony of this species in early 2002 in the Palmyra desert. The bald ibises still breeding in Syria, discovered during an extensive biodiversity survey carried out as part of a FAO cooperation project, are the last living descendants of those depicted in Egyptian hieroglyphs from 4500 years ago. The discovery was made possible through the use of traditional ecological knowledge of the Bedouin nomads.

Following the discovery in Syria, a successful community-based ibis breeding intensive protection program was established in Palmyra during years 2002–2004, in parallel with an extensive capacity building program in the benefit of the local community and staff from the Syrian Steppe Commission. Fourteen chicks successfully fledged during this period. In addition to protection and training operations, data on threats and on feeding and breeding ecology were collected in the field. An Ibis Protected Area was recommended and established, and an awareness and education program was also launched and successfully implemented.

Two breeding failures were recorded in 2005 and 2008 following a change of project management and of ibis protection strategy, that occurred between 2004 and 2005 (from UN-FAO to Birdlife/RSPB management). Three birds were tagged with satellite tags and the migratory route and wintering site of the colony were discovered in 2006. Three surveys were undertaken at the wintering site on the Ethiopian highlands between 2006 and 2009, establishing that no immediate threats were present at the site. Thanks to an IUCN project the Ibis Protected Area in Palmyra desert was further developed in 2008–2009, addressing the threats of infrastructure proliferation and oil company heavy prospection schemes.

Meanwhile, it became apparent that only adults were reaching the wintering site in Ethiopia and that it was the low survival rate of immature birds—and thus an insufficient recruitment at the breeding colony in Palmyra—that was causing the slow and steady decline of the colony from 3 breeding pairs in 2002 to just 1 in 2010. Satellite tracking and surveys conducted in western Saudi Arabia during 2009–2010, with key cooperation of the Saudi Wildlife Authority, suggested that a combination of hunting and electrocution were causing a high mortality of dispersing immature ibises. This mortality is currently regarded as the main cause of the low recruitment occurred at the Palmyra colony during the years following the high breeding performance of period 2002–2004 (only 3 recruitment events out of 14 chicks fledged).

A supplementation trial could be eventually conducted in 2010 by introducing captive-born chicks into the wild colony in Palmyra. For this aim, a first captive breeding center was established in Palmyra. Three chicks introduced at the wild colony in Palmyra followed a migrating wild adult for more than 1,000 km (620 mi) from Palmyra well into southwest Saudi Arabia.

Conservation efforts were interrupted in March 2011 due to the worsening of the political situation in Syria. Palmyra trained rangers have reportedly continued to protect the breeding birds even during the subsequent years. The last year a lone bird was seen returning to Palmyra is 2014 (it returned alone also in 2013). In 2015 no birds came back. Consequently, due to delays in authorizations for surveys and several years of reduced and insufficient conservation efforts at the breeding grounds, the relict colony discovered in Syria in 2002 may be considered functionally extinct as of 2025.

==== Turkey ====
With the loss of the genuinely wild Turkish population, the Ministry of Environment and Forestry's Directorate of Natural Preservation and National Parks established a new semi-wild colony at Birecik. This was heavily managed, with birds taken into captivity after the breeding season to prevent migration. The program was successful, with numbers at 205 as of March 2016. The intent is to allow the birds to migrate once the population reaches a stable 100 pairs, excluding young.

The birds are released in late January or early February to breed outside the cages on ledges and, mainly, in the nest boxes in the breeding station compound. The ibises are free flying and forage around the Birecik area in forest nurseries, agricultural fields, and along the Euphrates, but supplementary food is also provided. Following the end of the breeding season, the birds are taken into cages in late July or early August to prevent migration. A trial migration using tagged birds confirmed the risks presented to travelling birds by pesticides. Later on the Syrian Civil War added one more reason to keep preventing migration.

=== Reintroductions ===
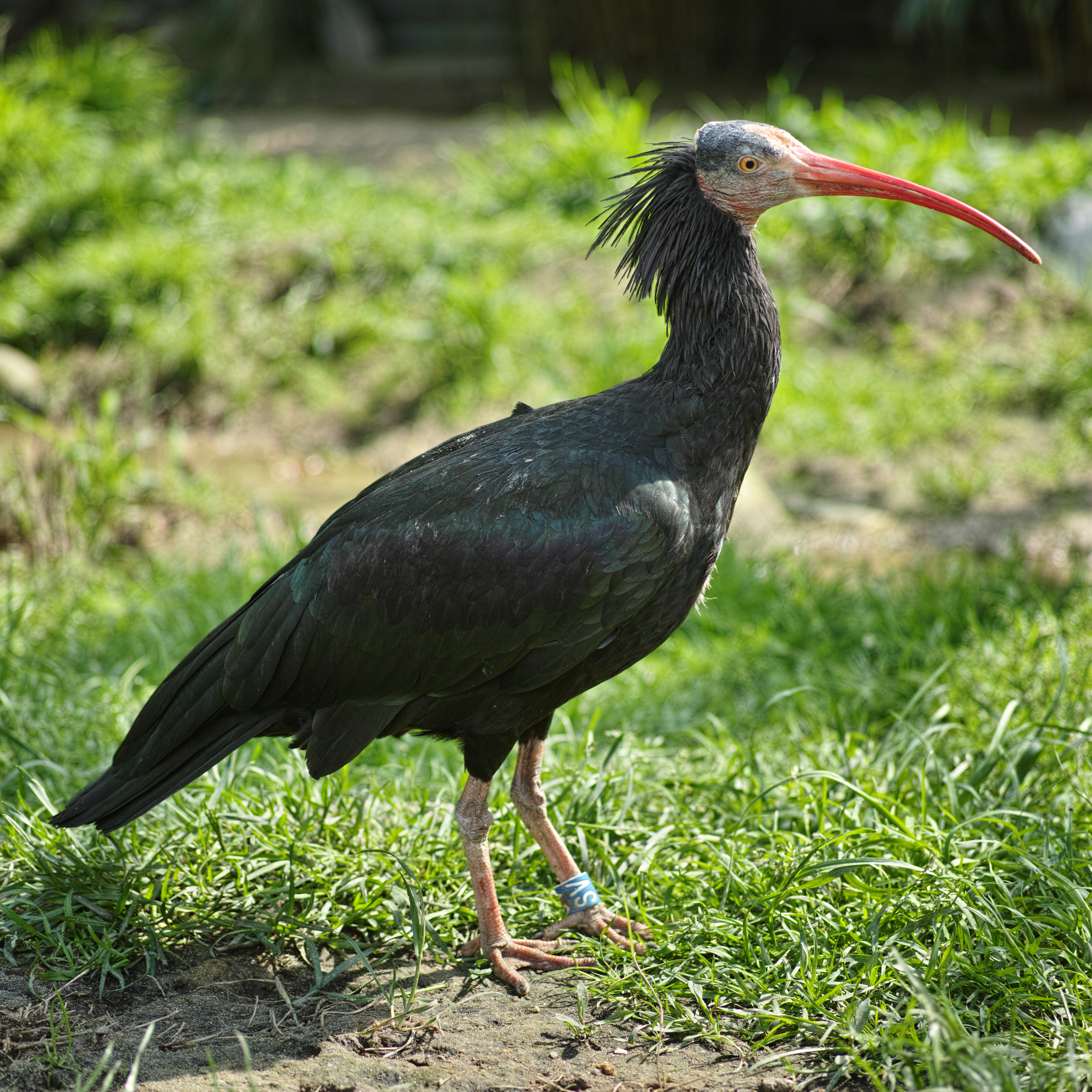
Tiergarten Schönbrunn in Vienna is running a successful breeding programme for reintroduction.

The guidelines for the conservation and reintroduction of the northern bald ibis were established in 2003 at an International Advisory Group for Northern Bald Ibis (IAGNBI) conference in Innsbruck at the Alpenzoo, which maintains the European studbook for the northern bald ibis.

Decisions taken at the meeting included:

- There should be no augmenting of the wild populations at Souss-Massa or in Palmyra using zoo-bred ibises.
- There are two distinctive populations of northern bald ibis, and the separate ranges of the eastern and western forms should be respected.
- In order to prepare birds for release, groups of chicks should be hand-reared by human "parents".
- Migration routes and stop-over points will have to be taught to young birds, since it is unlikely that they will discover this information by themselves.

A second conference in Spain in 2006 stressed the need to survey potential and former sites in north-west Africa and the Middle East for currently undetected colonies. The need to raise the standards of hygiene and husbandry in the Birecik aviaries was reiterated, and the prevalence of skin problems in a number of zoos reinforced the view that no zoo birds should be used for any free-flying trials. In future captive breeding and releasing programmes, only birds of known origin should be used.

==== Zoo populations ====
Geronticus eremita at the Bronx Zoo, video clip

There are 850 northern bald ibises in European zoos and a further 250 in captivity in Japan and North America. The 49 European zoos keeping this species produce 80 to 100 young birds per year, and earlier attempts at releasing captive-bred birds included close to 150 birds between 1976 and 1986 from an aviary at Birecik, 75 from Tel Aviv Zoo in 1983, and an unspecified number from a project in Almería, Spain, from 1991 to 1994; all these attempts were unsuccessful. All northern bald ibises in zoos, other than those in Turkey, are of the western population, and were imported from Morocco. Three bloodlines exist; the earliest relates to importations to Zoo Basel, Switzerland in the 1950s and 1960s, the next is the descendants of birds taken in the 1970s to stock Rabat Zoo, and the last captured wild birds were those taken to the Naturzoo, Rheine, in 1976 and 1978. Captive birds have a high incidence of skin problems, and 40% of those birds that had to be put down suffered from chronic ulcerative dermatitis, characterised by feather loss, rawness, and ulceration on the back, neck, and the undersides of the wings. The cause of this disease is unknown. Other major disease problems reported in zoo collections have been avian tuberculosis, gastric foreign bodies, bone disease, and heart problems. An outbreak of West Nile virus in Bronx Park, New York, involved northern bald ibises amongst many other species of birds and mammals.

==== Europe ====
In 1504, a decree by Archbishop Leonhard of Salzburg made the northern bald ibis one of the world's earliest officially protected species. They nested in the cliffs and on castles and ruins in the Graz/Steiermark and Salzburg regions of Austria and vanished around 1630–1645. Young birds were hunted as a delicacy at feasts for the nobility. Despite the decree, it died out in Austria as elsewhere in Europe.

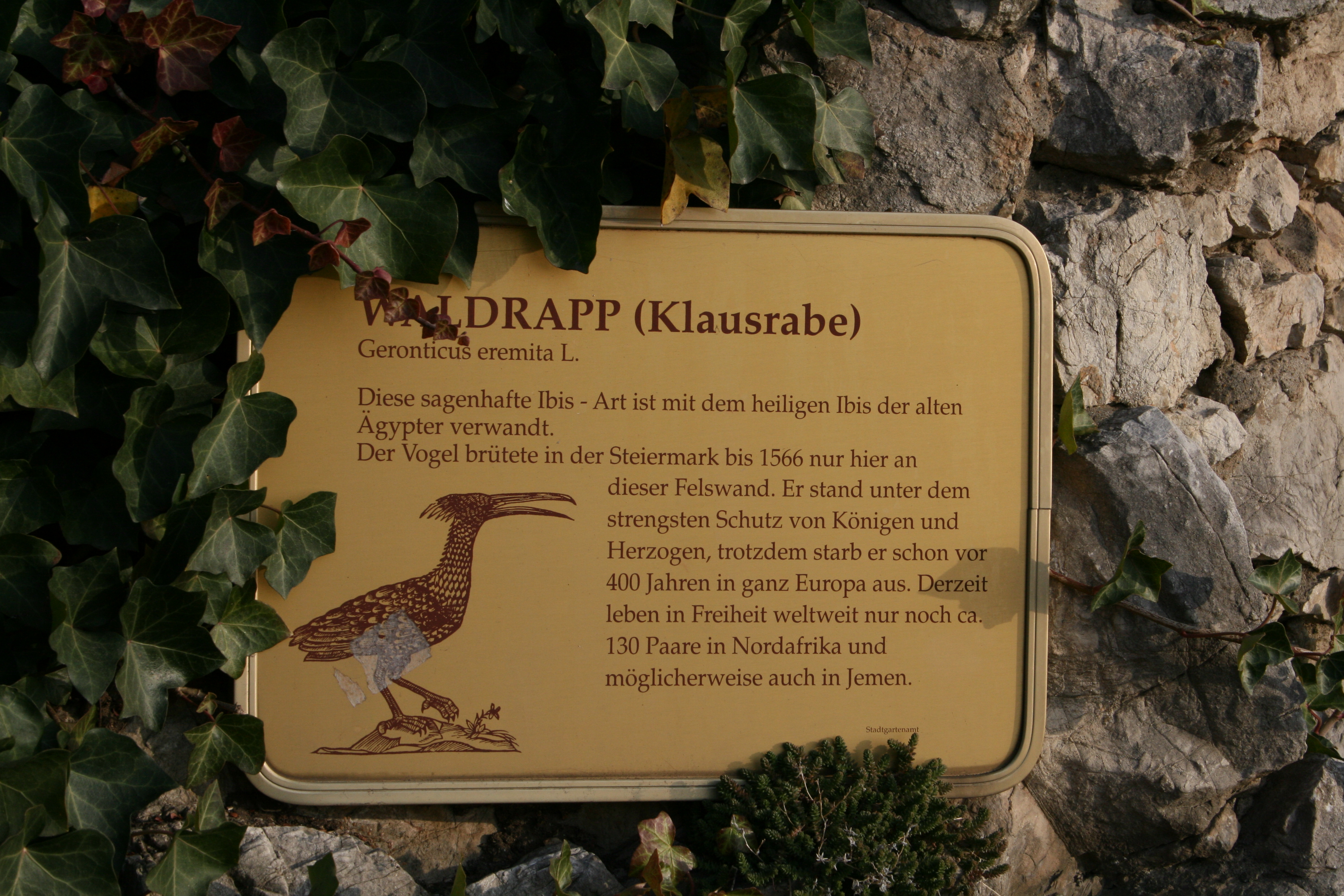
The Austrian reintroduction

There are now two ibis reintroduction projects in Austria, at Grünau and Kuchl. A research station at Grünau has a breeding colony managed, like the Turkish population, as a free-flying flock which is caged at migration time. The aim here is to investigate flock interactions and hormonal status, behavioural and ecological aspects of natural foraging, and the establishment of traditions via social learning.

The Scharnstein Project is an attempt to establish a migratory waldrapp colony by using ultralight planes to teach a migration route. The scheme builds on the Grünau research by developing a method to control and guide the autumn migration of a founder population, which then can pass this migration tradition to subsequent generations. In May 2002, 11 birds from the Vienna Zoo and the Grünau colony were trained to follow two microlight planes, and in 2003, a first attempt was made to lead a group of birds from Scharnstein to southern Tuscany. Due to adverse weather and technical problems, the birds had to be transported by road over a considerable part of the distance. The subsequent releases were more successful, with birds wintering in Tuscany, and, from 2005, returning to northern Austria. In 2008, a female ibis named Aurelia flew 930 km (580 mi) back to Austria for her fourth return to the breeding site. The hazards of the journey are shown by the loss of her two offspring and her mate while on the southern journey in the autumn of 2007.

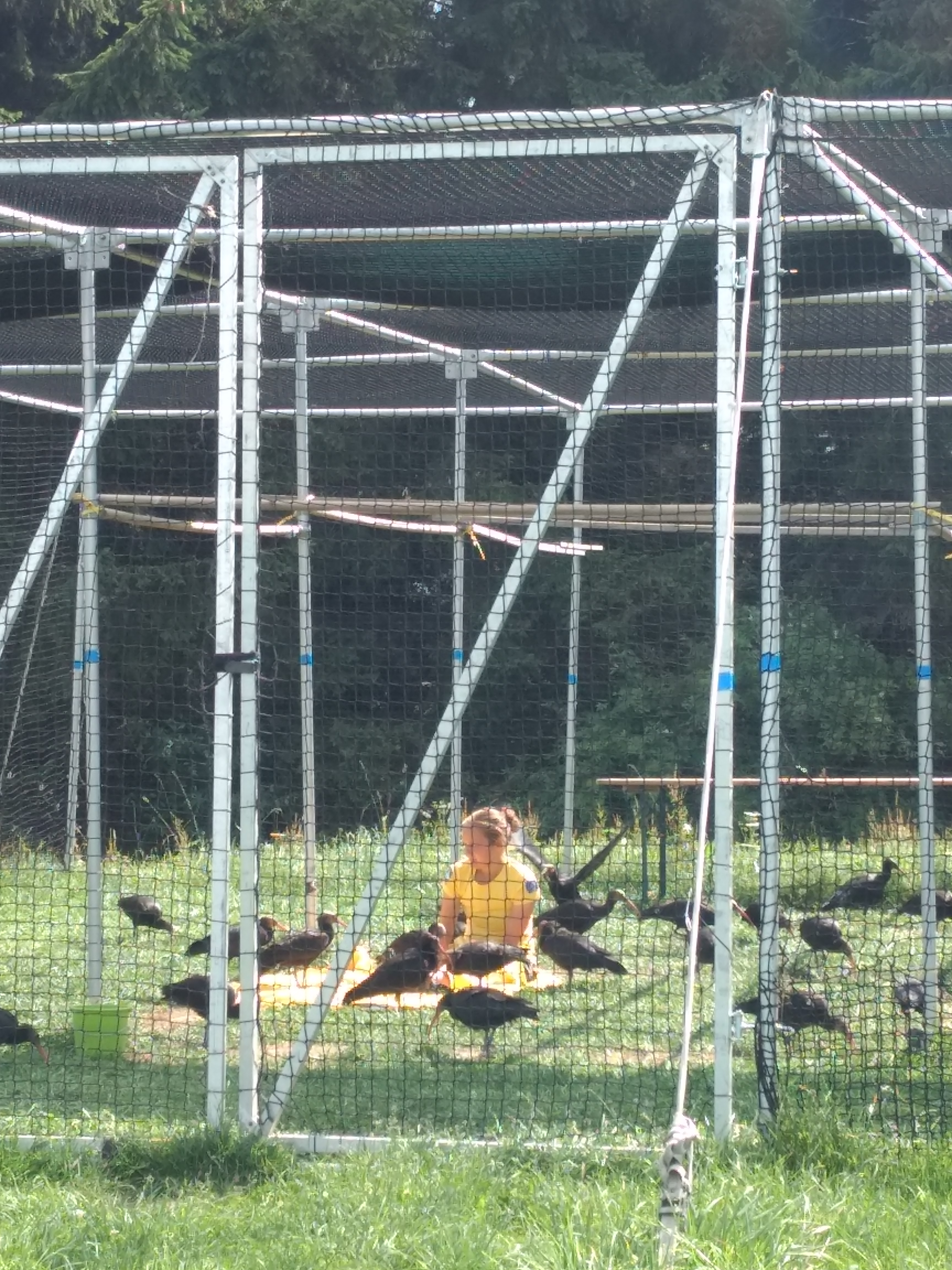
Waldrapp aviary near Lake Constance

On 13 January 2019 a bird released from the captive population in Rosegg Tierpark, Austria was caught alive in the town of Karlovo (CS Bulgaria). Regardless of the attempts to be rescued a few days later, it died. This is the first record of Geronticus eremita in Bulgaria

In August 2013 the European Union agreed to provide support to reintroduction projects until 2019 under its LIFE+ Biodiversity programme. The Reason for Hope project under the leadership of the biologist Dr. Johannes Fritz has operated one breeding and observation site in Austria, in Kuchl, near Salzburg, and two similar sites in Burghausen, Bavaria, and in Überlingen on Lake Constance in Baden-Württemberg. The positions and flight patterns of migratory birds are monitored with light-weight solar transmitters. After learning to follow their human foster-mothers seated in ultralight aircraft, around 30 young birds are led over the Alps to spend the winter months in Tuscany. Numerous studies on migratory bird behaviour have been published and presentations given at symposiums. In November 2019 it was announced that the project team succeeded in uniting juvenile birds with experienced adult birds so that they could fly to their wintering site together.

Proyecto Eremita is a Spanish reintroduction involving the release of nearly 30 birds in the Ministry of Defence training ground in La Janda district, Barbate, Cádiz Province. It had its first success in 2008, when a pair laid two eggs. This is probably the first attempt to breed in the wild in Spain for 500 years as the last definite reference to the northern bald ibis breeding in Spain is from a 15th-century falconry book. This effort has been undertaken by the Andalusian government's Environmental Ministry, the Spanish Ministry of Defence, and the Zoobotánico de Jeréz (Jerez Zoo and Botanical Gardens), with the assistance of the Estación Biológica de Doñana (Doñana Biological Station), CSIC and volunteers from the Cádiz Natural History Society. Previously, two birds left the area in 2005 and 14 in 2006, but nothing is known of their whereabouts other than that a ringed bird from Spain was seen in the Middle Atlas, Morocco in 2005. Internet pictures of this species taken near Armação de Pêra, Algarve, Portugal in 2009 and later, may be related to those releases in Spain. In the interim, the Spanish colony has been growing very well, from 9 breeding pairs in 2011, 10 in 2012 and 15 in 2013 to 23 breeding pairs in 2014, which successfully raised 25 chicks in 2014. In 2014 the total population of this colony was 78 wild birds split into two colonies, originally along the cliffs of the Atlantic coast and in 2012 with a second colony of 5–6 breeding pairs that started at the cliffs 10 km inland next to a country road at La Barca de Vejer (Vejer de la Frontera). In 2022 the wild population of northern bald ibis living near Cádiz has increased to about 180 birds that roam an area of about 50 km.

In June 2023, a pair was reported nesting on a commercial building in Rümlang, near Zurich Airport in Switzerland, with two young, the first recorded breeding pair in Switzerland in over 400 years. The adults were reported to have been tracked from the reintroduction project at Überlingen in Germany.

==== Northern Morocco ====
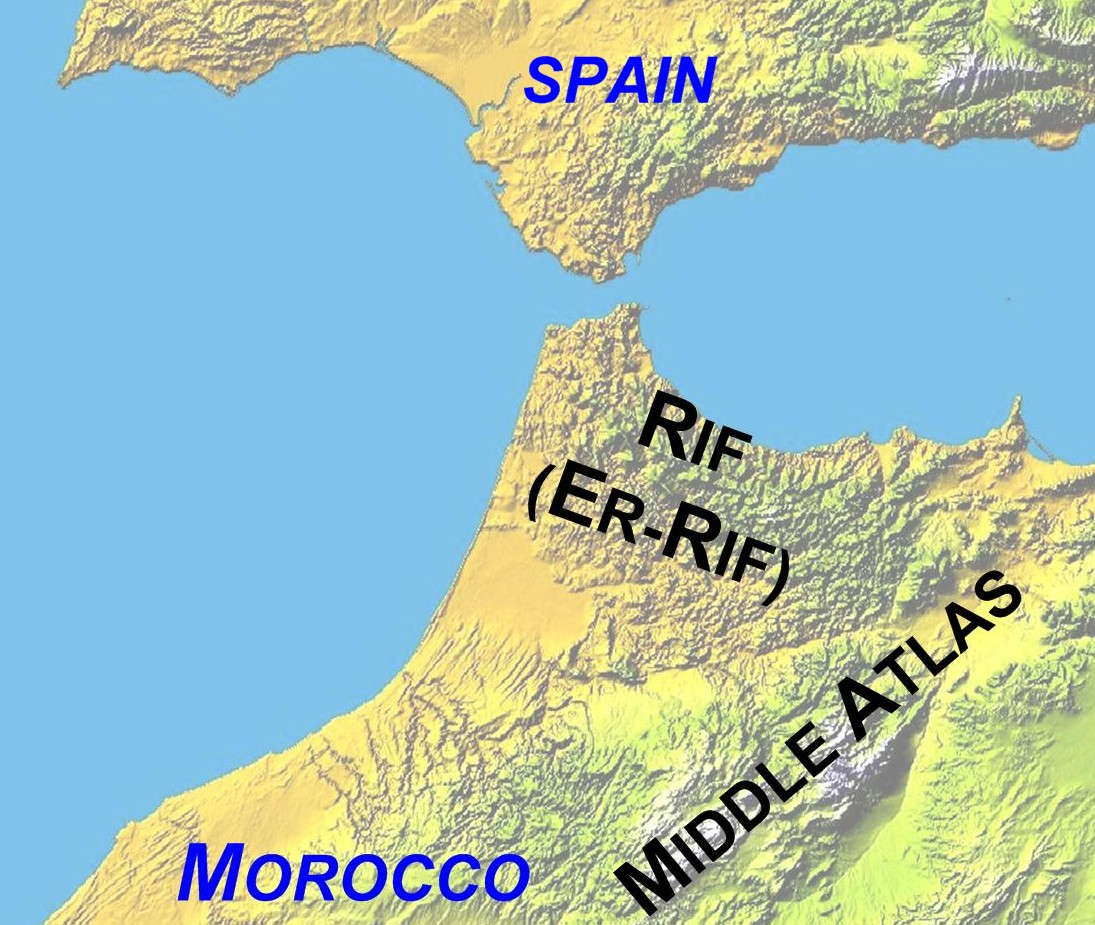
Location of the Rif mountains

There is a planned reintroduction of the ibis at Ain Tijja-Mezguitem in the north-east of Morocco. Since the wild populations further south remain vulnerable, and the porous sandstone of their breeding ledges is exposed to erosion, the intention is to establish a non-migratory population (stocked from German, Swiss, and Austrian zoos) in an area where this species was known to have bred up to about 1980. The station in the Rif mountains was built in 2000, and stocked with the first group of zoo-bred birds. A second importation of zoo-bred birds and the construction of an information centre took place in 2004. Six pairs bred in 2006 subsequent to a change in the birds' diet, and six offspring from five nests were successfully reared. In 2007 there were 19 birds (13 adults and six juveniles) in the aviary.

The rock walls of the mountains have many potential breeding ledges, and an artificial lake provides water to the birds and to the local human population. Steppe pasture which is not exposed to herbicides or pesticides gives good foraging. Once the population reaches around 40 birds, a release will be initiated, subject to international agreement. The reintroduction site is 760 km (470 mi) from Agadir on the other side of the Atlas Mountains, so accidental contamination of the wild colonies is unlikely.

== In culture ==
Northern bald ibis in Egyptian hieroglyphs

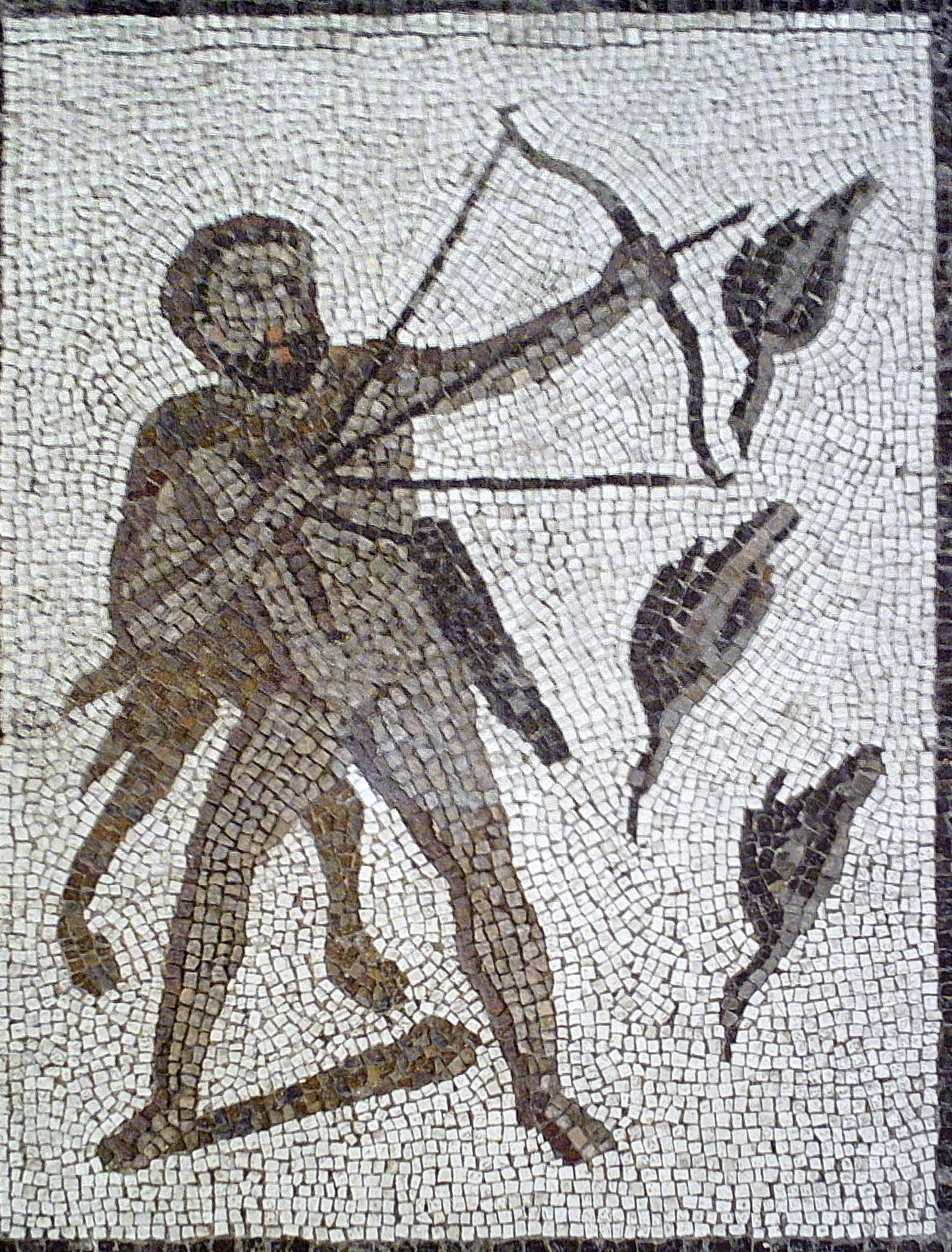
Heracles fights the Stymphalian birds

According to local legend in the Birecik area, the northern bald ibis was one of the first birds that Noah released from the Ark as a symbol of fertility, and a lingering religious sentiment in Turkey helped the colonies there to survive long after the demise of the species in Europe, as described above.

This ibis was revered as a holy bird and a symbol of brilliance and splendour in Ancient Egypt, where, together with the sacred ibis, it was regarded as an embodiment of Thoth, scribe of the gods, who was usually depicted with a man's body and the head of an ibis. The Old Egyptian word akh, "to be resplendent, to shine", was denoted in hieroglyphs by a bald ibis, presumably as a reference to its glossy plumage. In a more abstract sense, akh stood for excellence, glory, honour, and virtue. It has also been used to signify the soul or spirit, one of five elements constituting personality.

Herodotus wrote of the man-eating Stymphalian birds, which had wings of brass and sharp metallic feathers they could fire at their victims. Ridding Lake Stymphalia in Arcadia of these creatures was one of the twelve labours of Heracles. These mythical birds are sometimes considered to be based on the northern bald ibis, but since they were described as marsh birds, and usually depicted without crests, the legendary species is more likely to be derived from the sacred ibis. Some depictions, such as the 6th-century BC Athenian black-figure amphora in the British Museum, clearly show the black head and white body of the sacred ibis. After the bald ibis became extinct in Central Europe, some later writers thought that Gesner's description was one of several in his book depicting mythical creatures.

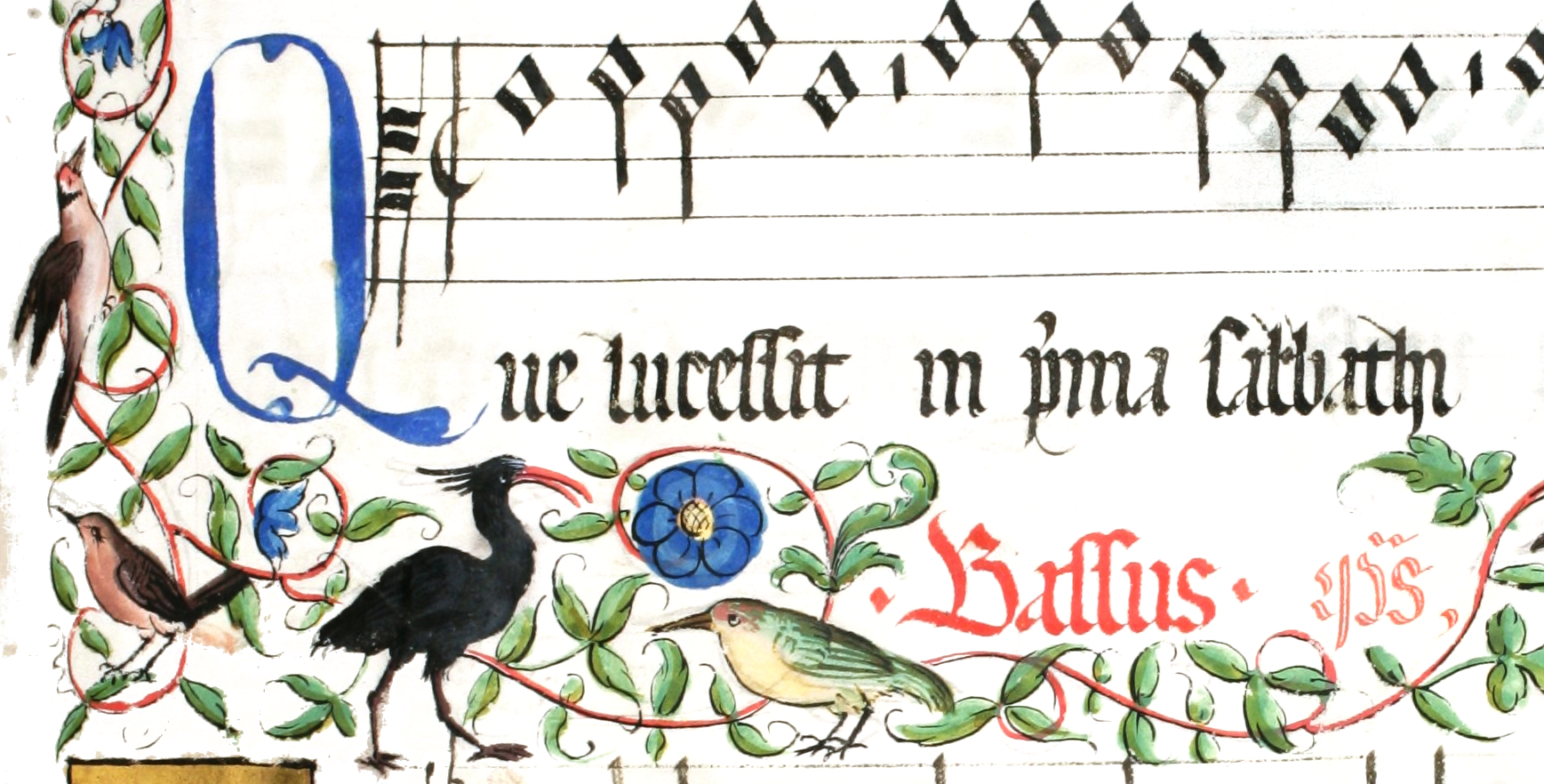
Illumination in a manuscript from 1562 at St. Gallen

The bird painted in 1490 in one of the Gothic frescoes in the Holy Trinity Church in Hrastovlje (now southwestern Slovenia) in the Karst by John of Kastav was most probably the northern bald ibis. A small illustration of the northern bald ibis is found in the illuminated St Galler Handschrift of 1562, a drawing by Joris Hoefnagel in Missale Romanum (1582-1590) and in paintings in the collection of Rudolf II at Vienna. It is believed that it had also been depicted at other places in Istria and Dalmatia, where it was presumably native during the Middle Ages, e.g. in the local church in Gradišče pri Divači and in the coat of arms of the noble family Elio from Koper. The portal of Lukovec Castle in Lukovica pri Brezovici (central Slovenia) also features this species.

In Birecik, Turkey an ancient celebration 'Kelaynak yortusu' held in mid-February to mark the return of the birds from Africa was revived in the 1950s.

Several countries have produced postage stamps which depict the northern bald ibis. They include Algeria, Morocco, Sudan, Syria, Turkey, and Yemen, which are breeding or migration locations; Austria, which is seeking to reintroduce the bird; and Jersey, which has a small captive population.
