= Dragomer =

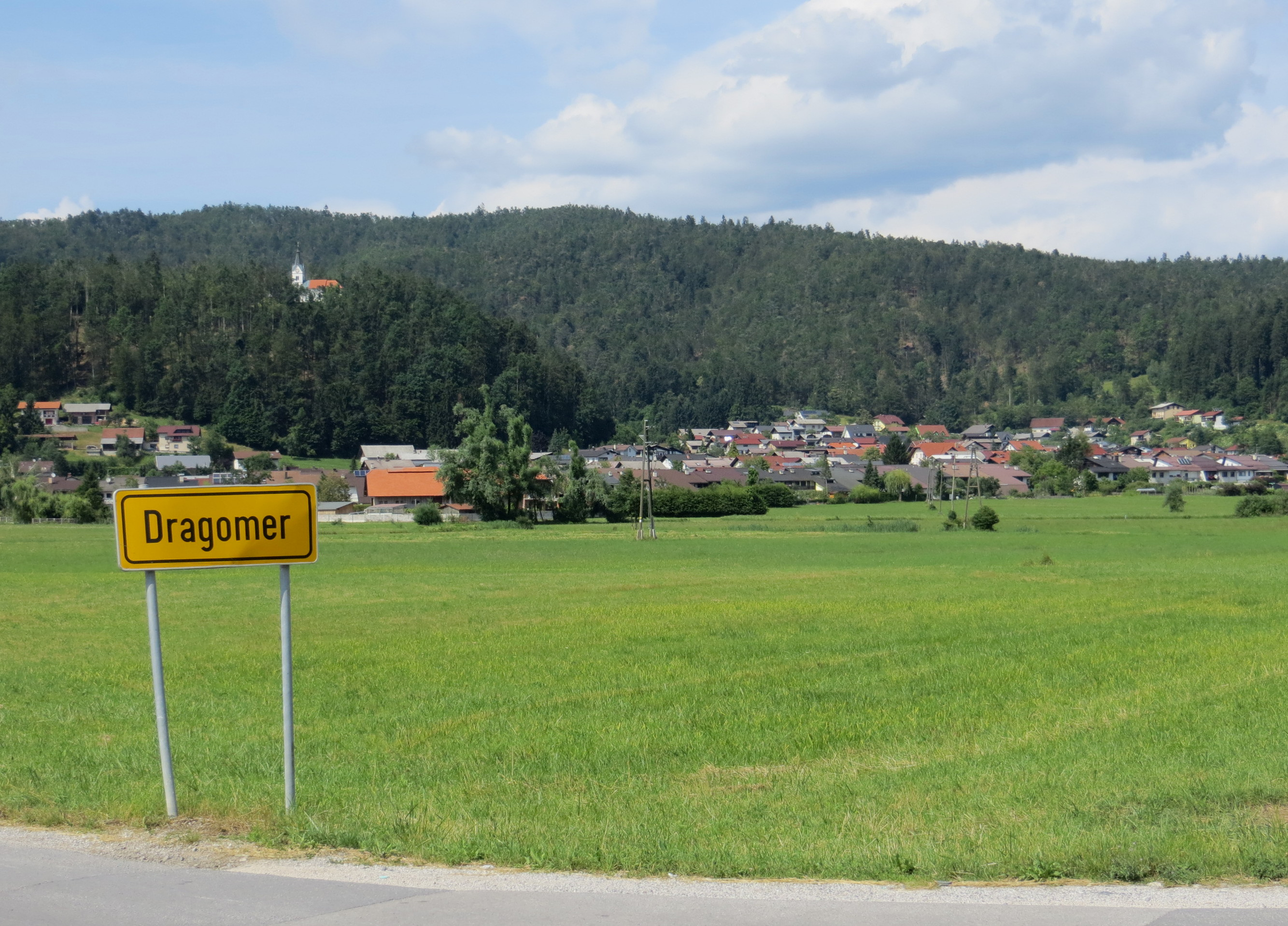

- Location in Slovenia
- Coordinates: 46°1′8.19″N 14°22′55.21″E
- Country: Slovenia
- Traditional region: Inner Carniola
- Statistical region: Central Slovenia
- Municipality: Log-Dragomer

Area
  - Total: 3.68 km^{2} (1.42 sq mi)
- Elevation: 299.1 m (981 ft)

Population (2002)
  - Total: 1,464

Dragomer (pronounced [ˈdɾaːɡɔmɛɾ]) is a settlement southwest of Ljubljana in the Municipality of Log-Dragomer in the Inner Carniola region of Slovenia.

== Name ==
Dragomer was attested in written sources in 1444 as Dragamer. It is based on a Slavic personal name, *Dragomirъ or *Dragoměrъ, presumably referring to an early inhabitant of the place.

== Church ==
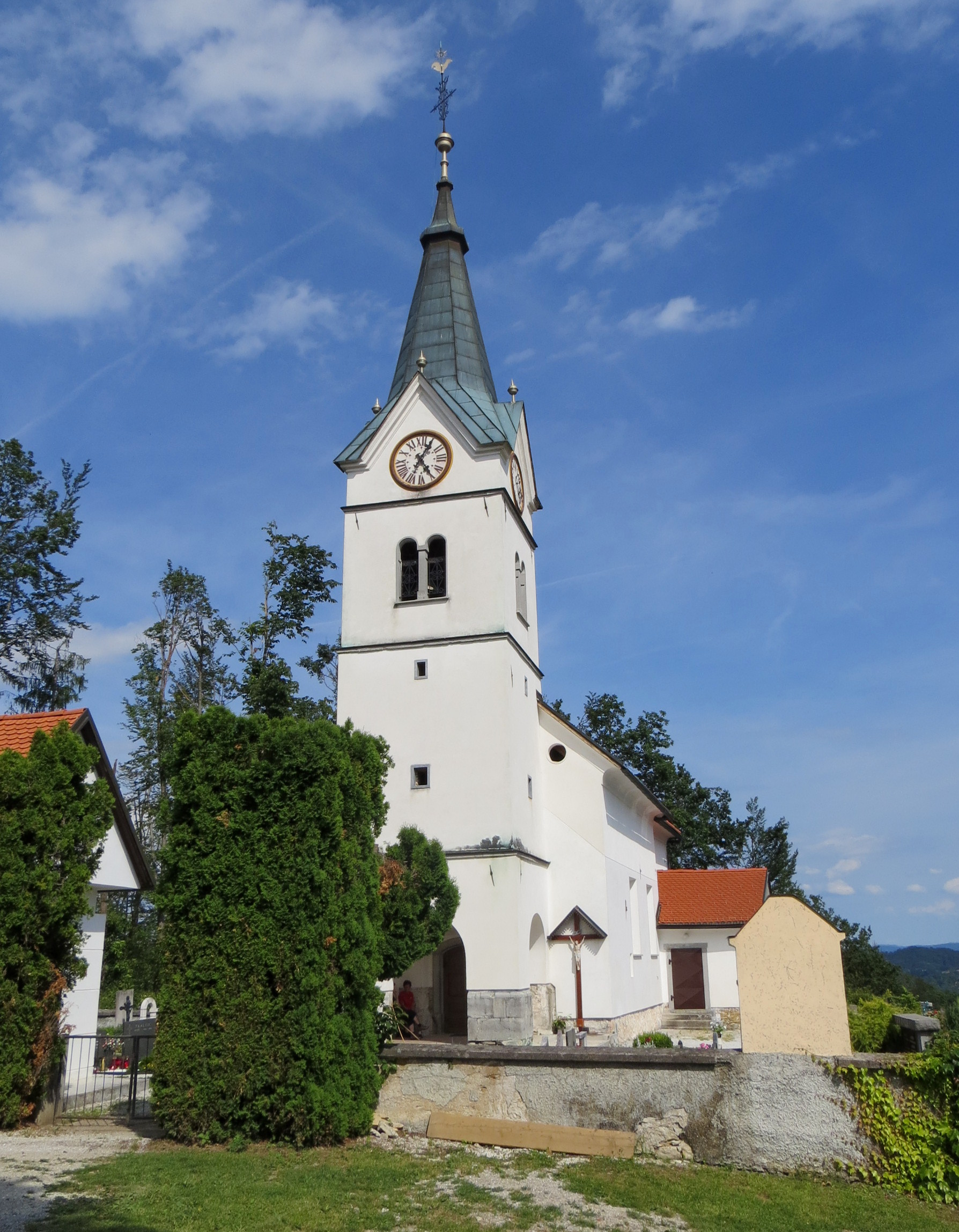
Saint Lawrence's Church

The local church in the settlement is dedicated to Saint Lawrence and belongs to the Parish of Brezovica.
