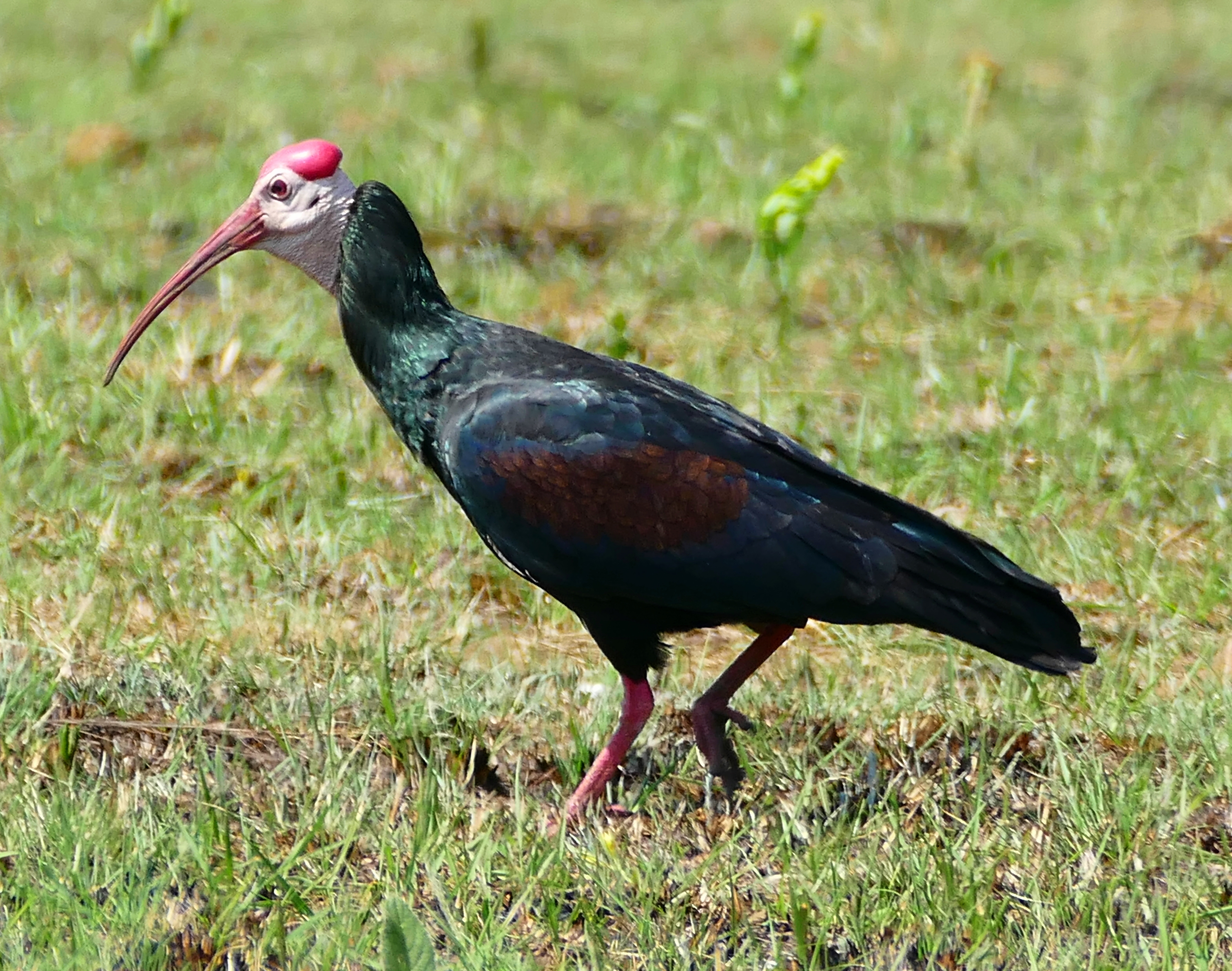
- In the uplands of Eswatini

Conservation status
- Near Threatened (IUCN 3.1)
- CITES Appendix II

Scientific classification
- Kingdom: Animalia
- Phylum: Chordata
- Class: Aves
- Order: Pelecaniformes
- Family: Threskiornithidae
- Genus: Geronticus
- Species: G. calvus

Binomial name
- Geronticus calvus (Boddaert, 1783)

Synonyms
- Tantalus calvus Boddaert, 1783

= Southern bald ibis =

Species of bird

The southern bald ibis (Geronticus calvus) is a large bird found in open grassland or semi-desert in the mountains of southern Africa. Taxonomically, it is most closely related to its counterpart in the northern regions of Africa, the waldrapp (Geronticus eremita). As a species, it has a very restricted homerange, limited to the southern tips of South Africa in highland and mountainous regions.

This large, glossy, blue-black ibis has an unfeathered red face and head, and a long, decurved red bill. It breeds colonially on and amongst rocks and on cliffs, laying two or three eggs which are incubated for 21 days before hatching. It is a large bird that feeds and roosts in substantial groups. It feeds on insects, small reptiles, rodents and small birds. They do little vocalizing other than occasional gobbling sounds.

The ibises are gregarious long-legged wading birds with long down-curved bills; they form one subfamily of the Threskiornithidae, the other subfamily being the spoonbills. The two Geronticus species differ from other ibises in that they have unfeathered faces and heads, breed on cliffs rather than in trees, and prefer arid habitats to the wetlands used by their relatives. The species is currently listed as near threatened on the IUCN Red List, however, it is in no immediate danger of extinction.

== Taxonomy ==
The southern bald ibis was described by the French polymath Georges-Louis Leclerc, Comte de Buffon in 1781 in his Histoire Naturelle des Oiseaux based a specimen obtained from the Cape of Good Hope region of South Africa. The bird was also illustrated in a hand-coloured plate engraved by François-Nicolas Martinet in the Planches Enluminées D'Histoire Naturelle which was produced under the supervision of Edme-Louis Daubenton to accompany Buffon's text. Neither the plate caption nor Buffon's description included a scientific name but in 1783 the Dutch naturalist Pieter Boddaert coined the binomial name Tantalus calvus in his catalogue of the Planches Enluminées. The southern bald ibis is now placed in the genus Geronticus that was erected by the German naturalist Johann Georg Wagler in 1832. No subspecies are recognised.

The southern bald ibis is part of the family, Threskiornithidae, which is composed of birds from the warm temperate and tropical regions of the world, with the exclusion of Oceania. The group is defined by the lack of feathers on their face. This family is composed of the ibises and their close relatives, the spoonbills.

Taxonomically, ibises are categorized as a subfamily named Threskiornithinae. This subfamily contains around 26 species of wading birds with long, thin, down-curved beaks, ranging in size from medium to large. These species rarely have a voice box, and if one is present, the bird only croaks or cackles harshly. Historically, ibises are an ancient group. Fossil records of these birds have been dated back to the Eocene period, 60 million years ago. Human history records also date these birds back 5 000 years.

The southern bald ibis is part of the genus Geronticus, which includes two distinct species. The southern bald ibis (Geronticus calvus) is restricted primarily to the southern regions of Africa whereas its counterpart, the waldrapp (Geronticus eremita) is found in the northern regions of the continent. Both species share common characteristics regardless of their geographic separation. Both species nest on rock cliffs and display distinct breeding behaviours adapted for their particular locations. Similarly, they both show evolutionary adaptations in foraging behaviours due to their dry habitats. The separation between these two species is believed to have occurred only 335 000 to 1 million years ago.

== Description ==
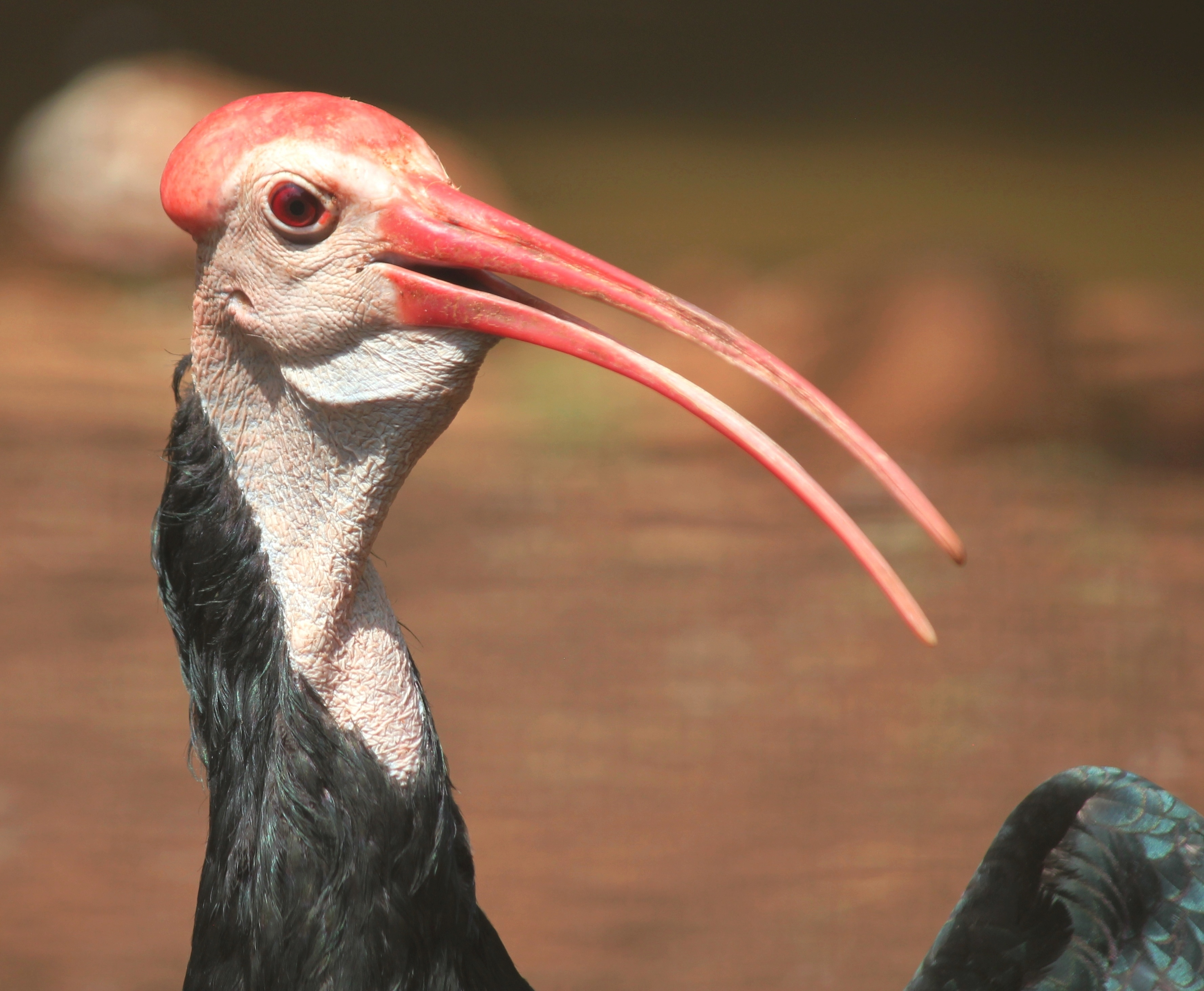
A close-up of the head, Pretoria Zoo

The southern bald ibis (Geronticus calvus) is an uncommon bird endemic to the highlands of the southern African region. In South Africa, the species' total breeding population was estimated around 4,600 birds. As of 2024, the total population lower bound is estimated between 7,000 and 8,000. However, little is known about the biology of this species.

Its plumage is dark green with iridescent streaks of green, violet and bronze. The neck displays long feathers that are a blue-green shade. As adults, its shoulders display shades of copper. However, as juveniles, the plumage is predominantly a dull grey color. The bird's Latin name, Geronticus calvus, is translated as "bald, old man", referring to the bird's featherless, wrinkled head and face. The head is the key feature in recognizing this species due to the evident bare whitish skin. On the top of the head, there is a red dome-shaped crown. The bills of these birds are down-curved and red, along with their legs. Similarly, their eyes are also colored an orange-red shade.

== Distribution and habitat ==
The southern bald ibis is a species with a very restricted homerange. It is estimated that there are only 4 600 breeding birds of this species in the South African region. The species is confined to the eastern regions of South Africa and are restricted to the highland and mountainous regions. Its range extends from the highlands of Lesotho extending into Eswatini. The birds may migrate short distances within their designated home ranges.

These birds are cliff-nesters and breed in the open areas of mountain faces, as well as river gorges and sometimes around waterfalls. Their breeding habitat is composed mainly of mountainous grasslands that range in altitude from 1 200 to 2 000 meters above sea level. The grassland areas are labeled as 'sour' due to the low nutritional value of the foliage in late summer and early autumn due to the previous grazing of mammals.

== Behaviour ==
The southern bald ibis is a bird that feeds and roosts in large groups. They travel in groups of up to 100 individuals to find suitable foraging areas. As insectivores, their diet is composed mainly of insects and other small invertebrates found in burnt grasslands. The species live on cliff edges where they build their nests and for the most part, breed in colonies. They do little vocalizing besides occasional gobbling sounds.

=== Vocalizations ===
The southern bald ibis is known to be a relatively quiet bird. This species in particular has been noted to make a weak gobbling sound. This is refers back to their old Afrikaans name of "Wilde-Kalkoen", otherwise translated as "wild turkey". This bird is most boisterous in the nesting areas and in flight. It projects a high-pitched keeaaw-klaup-klaup call, resembling that of a turkey's.

=== Diet ===
This species is insectivorous and feeds predominantly on insects and other small terrestrial invertebrates. It is a forager, alternating between feeding in harvested maize fields, overgrazed pastures and burnt grasslands. They walk along the land while pecking and probing the ground. The main component of its diet is the caterpillar of the maize stalk borer, Busseola fusca. This bird will also turn over feces and leaves to search for prey including caterpillars, grasshoppers, beetles, earthworms, snails and sometimes frogs, small dead mammals and birds.

Throughout July and the first half of August, before laying their eggs, the birds are found foraging in maize fields. In the second half of August and early September, during the incubation period, the birds are seen alternating between the maize fields, grazed pastures and burnt grasslands. Finally, in the nestling phase of September and October, they forge in maize fields, but more frequently in ploughed fields. It is only on rare occasions that ibises are seen in tall grasses and almost never in marshy areas. These birds avoid the tall grasses due to the hindering of their mobility and the potential hiding of their prey. This area would require a slow-walk feeding technique, whereas this bird is known to use a fast-walk technique for their feeding. They also appear to avoid foraging in areas very close to their nesting sites.

Their predominant feeding area, the burnt grasslands, are termed "sour" due to the low availability of nutrients. These areas are burned every 1 to 3 years to clear any excess of foliage. In winter and spring, the ibises feed in the burned areas where new growth is emerging and scavenge for any available insects. Their breeding season is linked with the burning period of these crops. Therefore, successful breeding and survival is partially dependent on the availability of these burned grasslands.

=== Reproduction ===
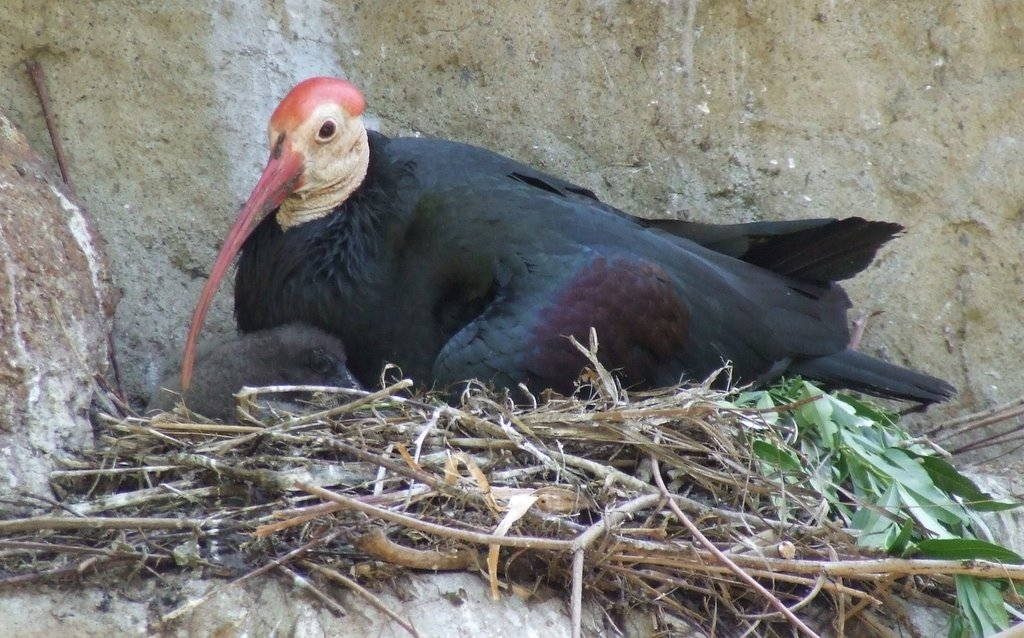
Southern bald ibis in a nest with young

The southern bald ibis nests in cliffs and breeds on open ledges. Due to the mostly inaccessible nature of these areas, observations during breeding season are difficult to obtain. However, these birds are known to breed predominantly in colonies, while some pairs decide to nest away from the rest. The females lay their eggs anywhere from late July to mid-October. Following this, the young develop feathers for flight around mid-October and into the month of December.

Their nests are made mostly of sticks and grass. On average, the collection of these materials begins around two weeks before the first egg is laid. Once the first egg is laid, incubation lasts from 26 to 32 days. The incubating birds change their position and rotate the egg more frequently around three days before the hatch day. Once hatched, the chicks spend the first 7 to 10 days feeding from their parent via regurgitation. After 35 days, the young leave the nest to wander around and after 40 to 50 days, the chicks are able to fly, but still spend most of their time on the ledges of the cliff or in their nest.

== Conservation status ==
The southern bald ibis is currently listed as Near Threatened on the IUCN Red List of Threatened Species. However, there is no immediate threat of the species going extinct. The bird is also listed in the Convention on International Trade in Endangered Species (CITES), signifying that the trade of this species is substantially regulated.

One of the greatest causes in the decline of this species is human disturbance at their breeding sites and the degradation of their habitat. Most of the breeding sites occur on privately owned land, whereas only a small minority of breeding pairs are located on nature reserves or state forest land, which are the only areas where they are guaranteed protection. Therefore, a large portion of the population is dependent on the efforts and contributions of private landowners. Furthermore, another threat is that the adult birds may be captured in order to collect the eggs and nestlings for food or medicine in some African tribal practices. The hunting of these birds has also been popular in farming populations to supplement their meat supplies. Local hunting continues to be a threat today.

== Gallery ==
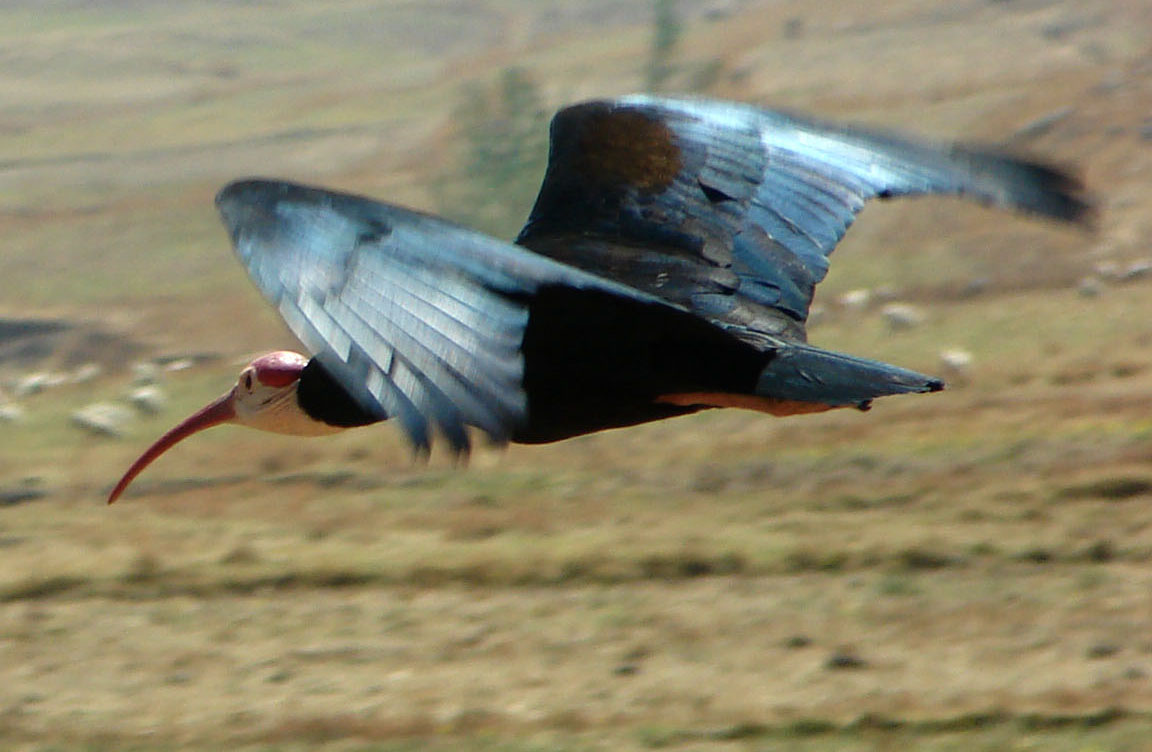
Southern bald ibis in flight, Lesotho

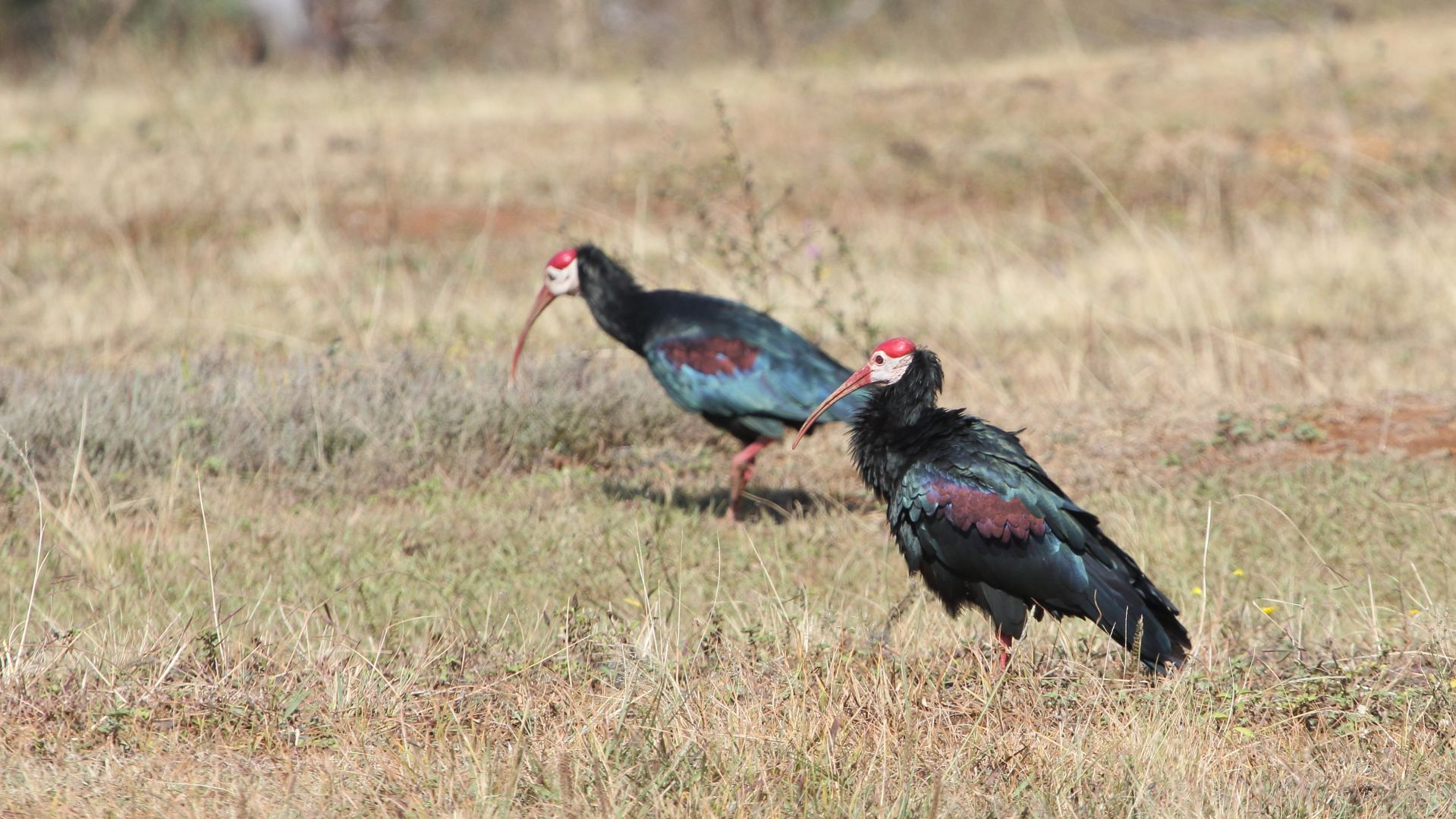
Foraging in short grassland, KwaZulu-Natal

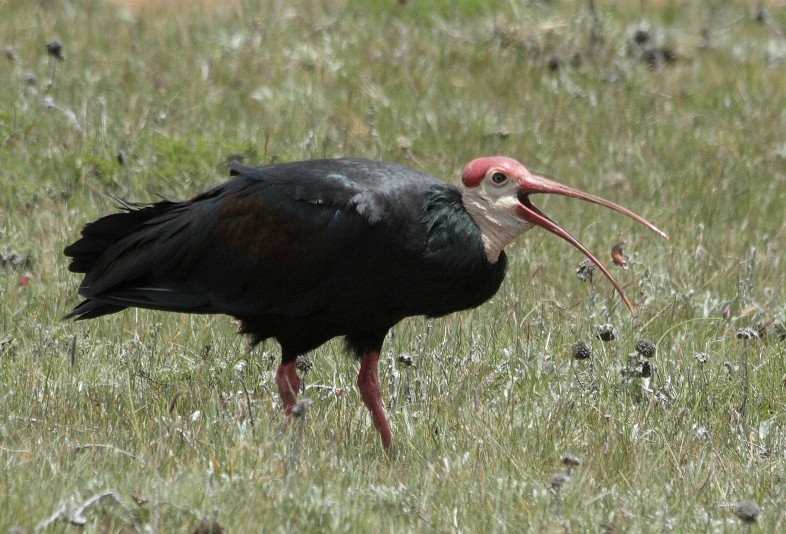
Foraging in short grassland, Lesotho

Video of the Geronticus calvus at Disney's Animal Kingdom
