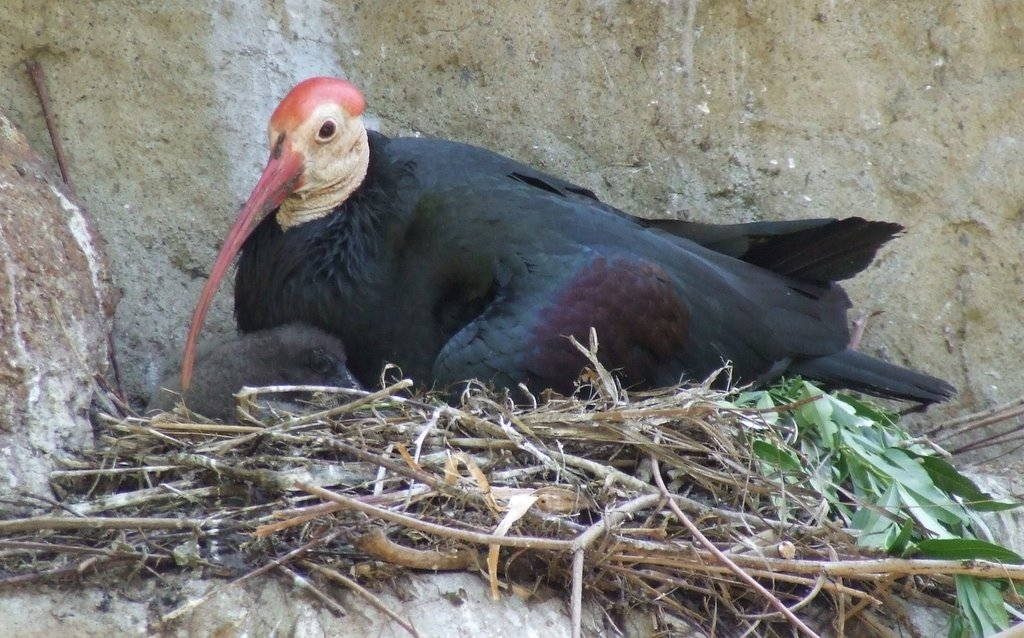
- Nesting southern bald ibis (G. calvus) with young.

Scientific classification
- Kingdom: Animalia
- Phylum: Chordata
- Class: Aves
- Order: Pelecaniformes
- Family: Threskiornithidae
- Subfamily: Threskiornithinae
- Genus: Geronticus; Wagler, 1832

Type species
- Tantalus calvus Boddaert, 1783

Species
- Geronticus calvus Geronticus eremita For fossil species, see text

= Geronticus =

Geronticus Temporal range: Middle Miocene to recent 13–0 Ma

Genus of birds

The small bird genus Geronticus belongs to the ibis subfamily Threskiornithinae. Its name is derived from the Greek gérontos (γέρωντος, "old man") in reference to the bald head of these dark-plumaged birds; in English, they are called bald ibises.

The genus was erected by the German naturalist Johann Georg Wagler in 1832. The type species was subsequently designated as the southern bald ibis (Geronticus calvus).

== Species ==
Genus Geronticus – Wagler, 1832 – two species
Common name	Scientific name and subspecies	Range	Size and ecology	IUCN status and estimated population
northern bald ibis or waldrapp	Geronticus eremita (Linnaeus, 1758)	Mediterranean	Size: Has a neck crest of elongated feathers. Habitat: Its range had expanded after the last glacial period to the Alps of Germany and even a bit further north, but it was rendered extinct there mainly due to habitat destruction and unsustainable hunting. It is subject to ongoing reintroduction programs. Diet:	EN
southern bald ibis	Geronticus calvus (Boddaert, 1783)	subtropical southern Africa	Size: Has a red crown patch but no crest. Habitat: Diet:	VU

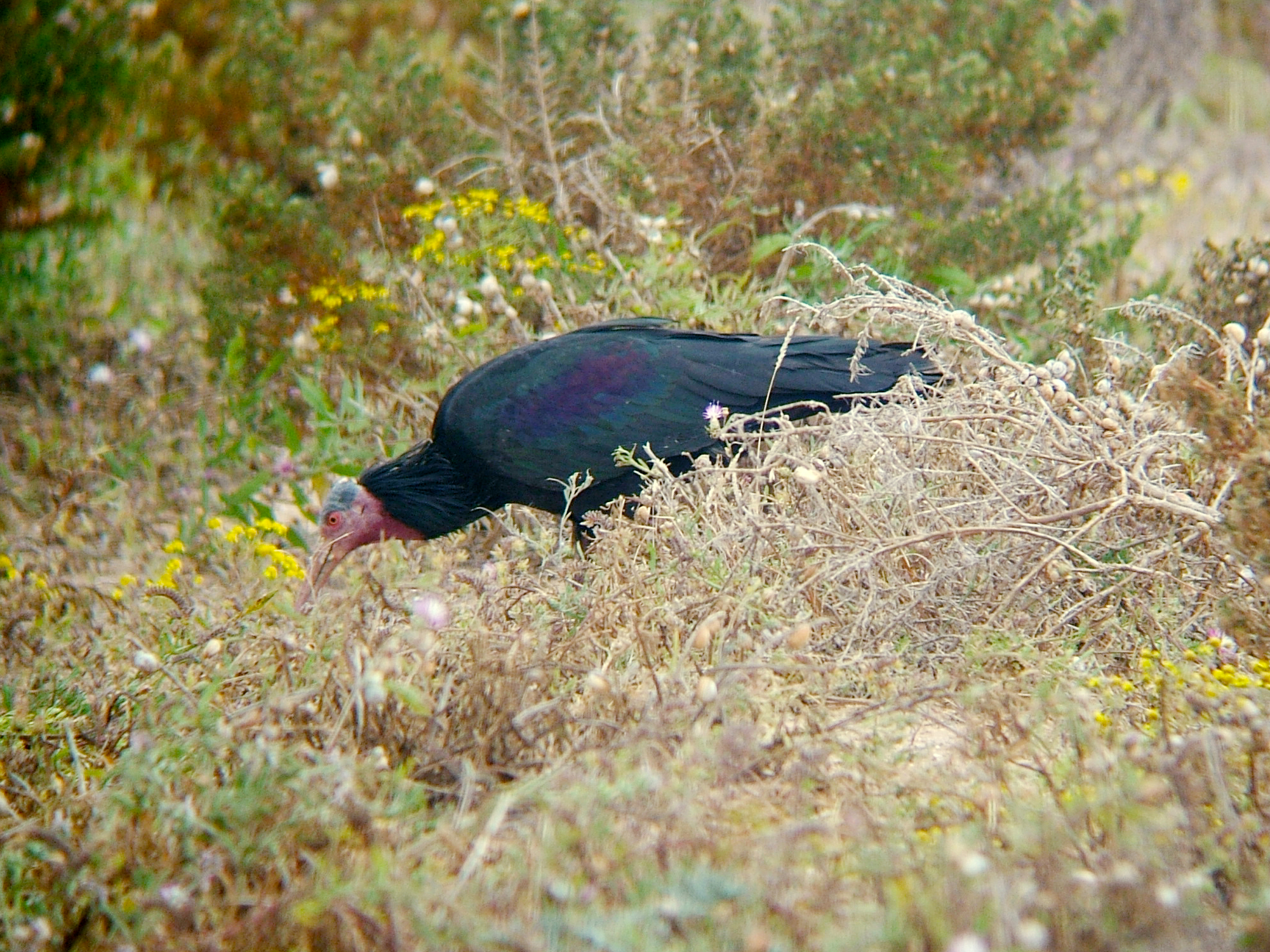
Wild northern bald ibis (G. eremita) foraging in Morocco

Like most ibises, they are gregarious long-legged wading birds with long down-curved bills; they form one subfamily of the Threskiornithidae, the other subfamily being the spoonbills. The two Geronticus species differ from other ibises in that they have unfeathered faces and heads, breed on cliffs rather than in trees, and prefer arid habitats to the wetlands used by their relatives. Their food contains fewer aquatic animals and more terrestrial ones; they are known to gather together and feed on locust swarms, killing many of these notorious pests. This has also contributed to their decline however, as they were much affected by indiscriminate pesticide spraying in the mid-to-late 20th century, leading to their disappearance from many regions.

== Fossil record ==
Geronticus perplexus is by far the oldest fossil assigned to the present genus. It is known only from a piece of distal right humerus, found at Sansan, France, in Middle Miocene rocks of the Serravallian faunal stage MN 6 (about 12-14 million years ago). It was initially considered to be a heron and placed in the genera Ardea and Proardea. More plesiomorphic than the living species, it seems to represent an ancient member of the Geronticus lineage, in line with the theory that most living ibis genera seem to have evolved before 15 million years ago (mya).

Geronticus apelex is apparently the direct ancestor of the southern bald ibis. Its remains were found in Early Pliocene deposits near Langebaanweg, South Africa, which date back about five million years.

What may be an ancestral European form, Geronticus balcanicus, was found in a Late Pliocene deposit near Slivnitsa, Bulgaria. It is hitherto only known from one left and one right carpometacarpus piece (NMNHS 14 and NMNHS 453, respectively) which are almost identical to those of living bald ibises. Contemporaneous with these during the early MN18 faunal stage – about two mya – birds entirely indistinguishable from the modern northern bald ibis inhabited at least Spain, if not the whole western Mediterranean region already. Thus, the extinct species may be the immediate ancestor of G. eremita, which would have originated at the western extent of its range. Some authors even include the Bulgarian population in G. eremita, but most are more cautious. G. balcanicus may also represent a lineage related but not ancestral to the northern bald ibis, which inhabited the inland regions northeastwards of the European Alpides and – like the immediate ancestor of G. eremita in this scenario – was isolated from the ancestors of G. calvus when gene flow across tropical Africa ceased.
