= Municipality of Log-Dragomer =

Municipality of Slovenia

Municipality of Log–Dragomer Občina Log - Dragomer
- Municipality
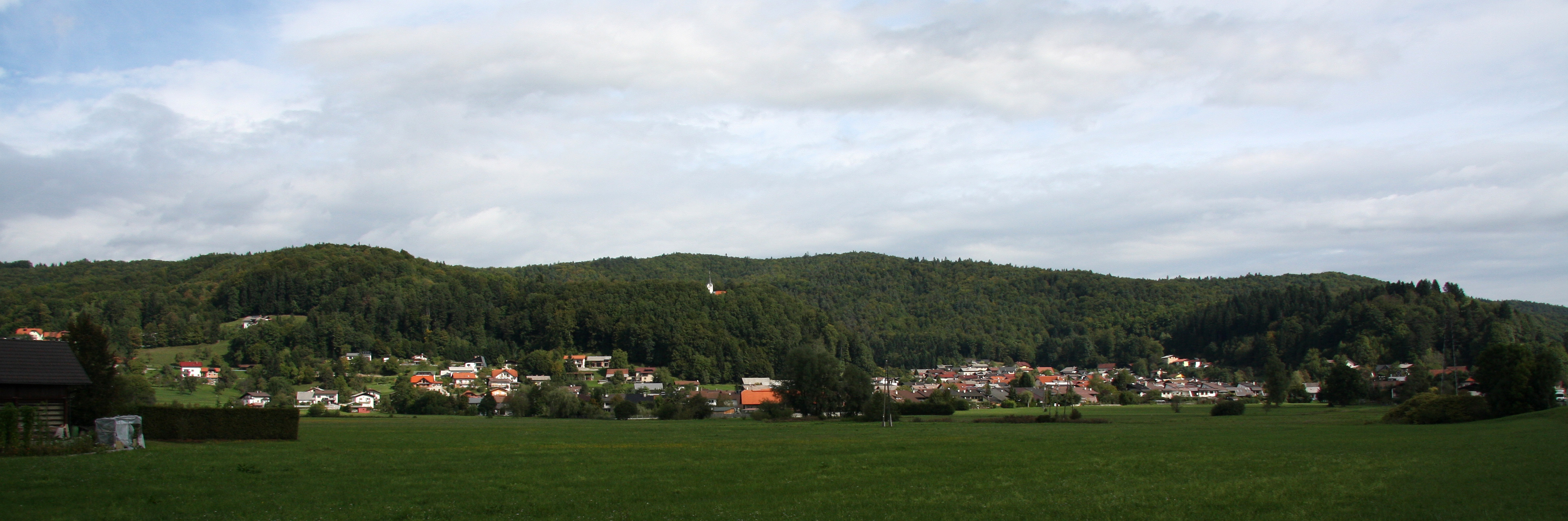

- Location of the Municipality of Log–Dragomer in Slovenia
- Coordinates: 46°0′41″N 14°22′30″E
- Country: Slovenia

Government
  - Mayor: Miran Stanovnik (Independent)

Area
  - Total: 11 km^{2} (4.2 sq mi)

Population (2002)
  - Total: 3,465
  - Density: 310/km^{2} (820/sq mi)
- Time zone: UTC+01 (CET)
  - Summer (DST): UTC+02 (CEST)
- Website: www.log-dragomer.si

The Municipality of Log-Dragomer (pronounced [ˈloːk ˈdɾaːɡɔmɛɾ]; Slovene: Občina Log - Dragomer) is a small municipality to the southwest of Ljubljana in the Inner Carniola region of Slovenia. It was created in 2006, when it split from the Municipality of Vrhnika. The seat of the municipality is the town of Log pri Brezovici.

== Settlements ==
In addition to the municipal seat of Log pri Brezovici, the municipality also includes the settlements of Dragomer and Lukovica pri Brezovici.
