= Oued Tamri =

Location
- Country: Morocco

Oued Tamri is a river in western Morocco which discharges to the Atlantic Ocean near the village of Tamri.

The surface flow becomes very low at the end of summer before the rainy season has commenced. Until recently the northern bald ibis was believed to survive in the wild only in Morocco at Souss-Massa National Park (338 km^{2}) where there are three colonies, and at the nearby Tamri River mouth, where there is one colony containing almost half the African breeding population, with some movement of birds between these two sites.

Waters of the Oued Tamri are quite alkaline and moderately turbid from the fine sediments washing down from the mountainous terrain to the east. Autumnal pH levels have been measured in the range of 9.6.
