= Lukovica pri Brezovici =

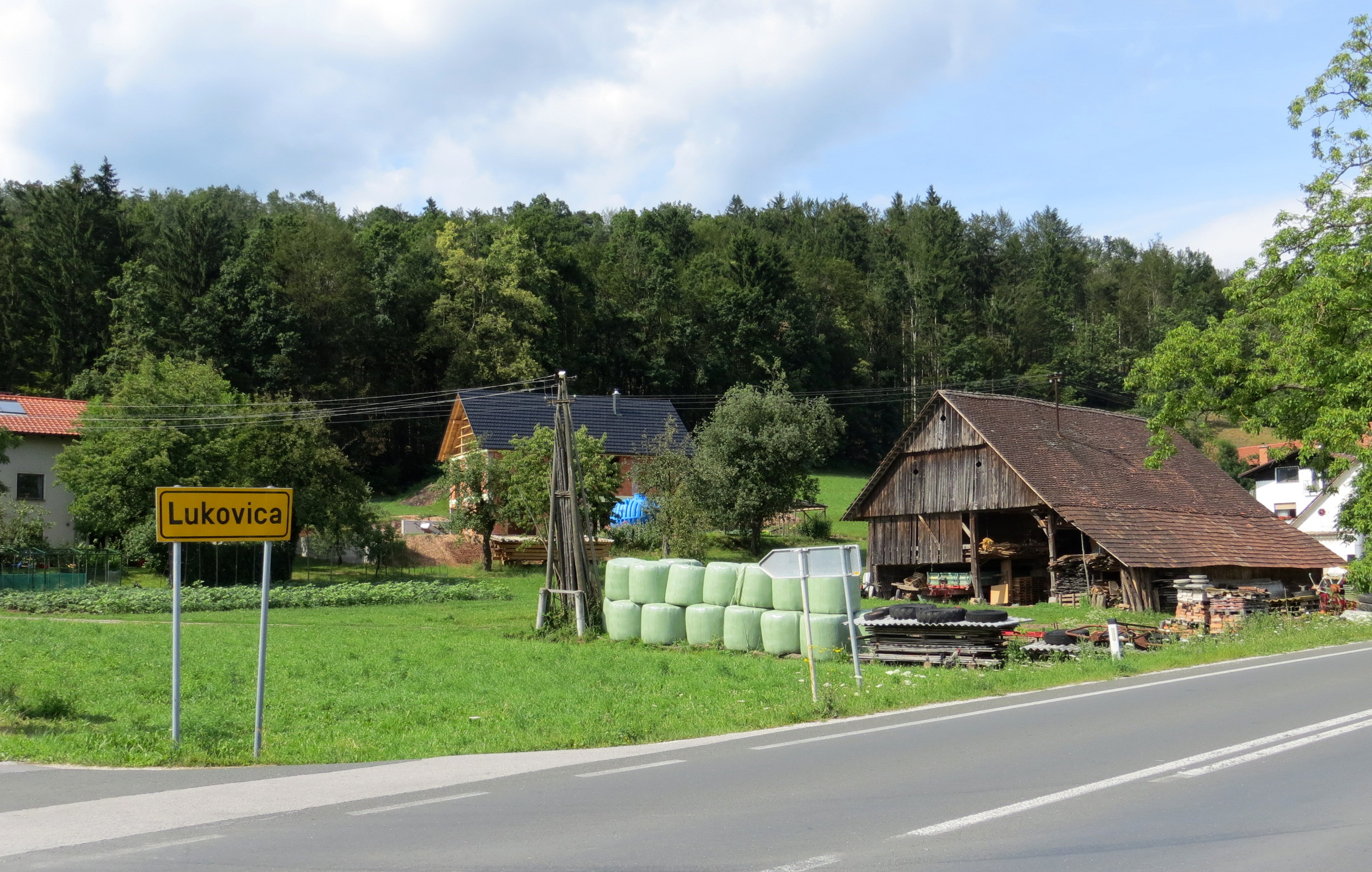

- Location in Slovenia
- Coordinates: 46°1′1.56″N 14°23′28.3″E
- Country: Slovenia
- Traditional region: Inner Carniola
- Statistical region: Central Slovenia
- Municipality: Log-Dragomer

Area
  - Total: 2.74 km^{2} (1.06 sq mi)
- Elevation: 292.9 m (961 ft)

Population (2002)
  - Total: 513

Lukovica pri Brezovici (pronounced [ˈluːkɔʋitsa pɾi ˈbɾeːzɔʋitsi]; German: Lukowitz) is a settlement southwest of Ljubljana in the Municipality of Log-Dragomer in the Inner Carniola region of Slovenia.

== Geography ==
Lukovica pri Brezovici is an elongated settlement on both sides of the old road from Ljubljana to Vrhnika. Fat Peak (Slovene: Debeli vrh, 540 meters or 1,770 feet) rises to the north, and the Ljubljana Marsh lies to the south; the village's territory encompasses a large area of the marsh known as Big Bog (Slovene: Veliki mah). Most of the fields belonging to the village lie to the south, where the soil is boggy, and in places loamy and damp. There are also some fields on the slope of Fat Peak above the village.

== Name ==
Lukovica pri Brezovici was attested in written sources in 1431 as Lukowicz (and as Lukobicz in 1479). The name is probably derived from the common noun luk 'leek, onion, garlic', referring to the local vegetation. The name of the settlement was changed from Lukovica to Lukovica pri Brezovici in 1955. In the past the German name was Lukowitz.
