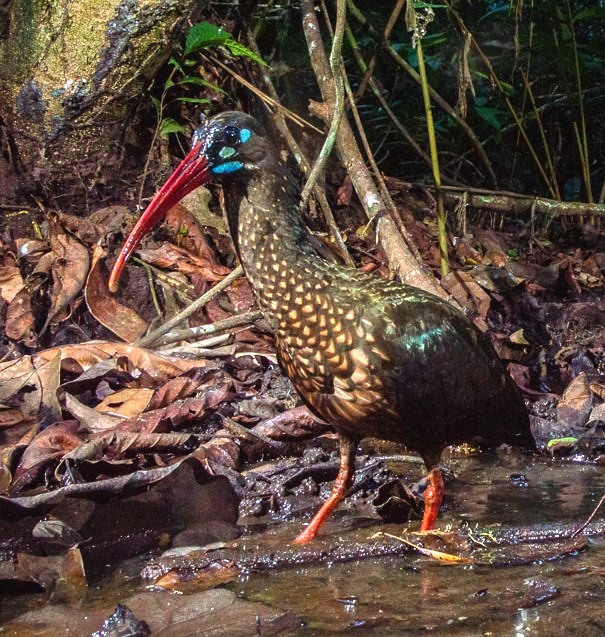
- Imaged by camera trap in the DRC

Conservation status
- Least Concern (IUCN 3.1)

Scientific classification
- Kingdom: Animalia
- Phylum: Chordata
- Class: Aves
- Order: Pelecaniformes
- Family: Threskiornithidae
- Genus: Bostrychia
- Species: B. rara

Binomial name
- Bostrychia rara (Rothschild, Hartert & Kleinschmidt, 1897)

= Spot-breasted ibis =

Species of bird

The spot-breasted ibis (Bostrychia rara) is a small, forest-dwelling ibis found in African lowland forests and swampy forested areas. Its preference for dense rainforests in tropical Africa means that it is seldom seen and is vulnerable to deforestation.

== Description ==
The spot-breasted ibis is a small, dark ibis (around 47 cm (19 in)), with long legs and a long red bill. The adult has a long, loose crest at the back of its head, which is dark brown to black and glossy green. Its plumage varies, but most usually tends to be brownish-blue. The mantle is brown and edged buff, but with a shiny green color. The rump and tail are blue-green, and the tail is slightly blue-green. It has blue-black wings and black underwing. The scapulars and the inner secondaries have an iridescent bronze green.

The best distinguishing feature is suggested by its name: the buff-spotted neck, breast and belly that are used as a diagnostic tool to identify the species. Otherwise, the upperparts are uniformly dark, with turquoise green spots in front of and behind the eyes (smaller in females); a similar colored streak crosses the face in line with the bill.

Their wing length is 270–290 mm, their bill length is 115–130 mm and their tarsus length is 56–65 mm. Flying birds can be distinguished by their broad wings and short tail. The juvenile is duller, and has a shorter crest.

== Taxonomy ==
The spot-breasted ibis is most closely related to the four other members of the genus Bostrychia, olive ibis, São Tomé ibis, hadada ibis and wattled ibis, which are also all restricted to sub-Saharan Africa. In particular, the spot-breasted ibis is closely related to the olive ibis and São Tomé ibis, and these three species are sometimes placed into their own genus, Lampribis. There are no recognized subspecies of the spot-breasted ibis.

== Habitat and distribution ==
The spot-breasted ibis is found in Angola, Cameroon, Central African Republic, the Republic of the Congo, the Democratic Republic of the Congo, Ivory Coast, Equatorial Guinea, Gabon, Ghana, Guinea, Liberia, Nigeria, Sierra Leone, and Uganda. Although it is found across a wide range of territory is it not common and considered to be rare. In the areas where it is found it is a resident of that area, this means as a species they do not migrate and they live there all year long. Its habitat is in wooded swamps or forested areas near streams.

== Behavior ==
Spot-breasted ibises are difficult to observe because they are usually silent and solitary. When disturbed, they are often flushed from the ground to a nearby perch, where they remain silent. They are best located at dusk and dawn as they call in flight.

=== Vocalization ===
They are usually silent and furtive when feeding on the ground. At dawn and dusk birds call in flight, giving a loud, raucous "ha-han".

=== Diet ===
Spot-breasted ibises are omnivorous and feed on some plant material, along with various small crustaceans and insects. Invertebrates consumed include grubs, worms, aquatic snails, larvae and a variety of beetles. Usually diurnal, although they occasionally feed at night by moonlight. Away from roosting sites, most individuals feed alone or in pairs. Like other ibises, the spot-breasted ibis probes through the mud in swamps and along banks of forest rivers and streams.

=== Reproduction ===
The nests of the spot-breasted ibis are usually found about on tree branches one to six meters above ground or water. They are solitary nesters and generally lay two eggs at a time. Reproduction occurs throughout the year, except during long dry seasons when water levels are too low. For example, in Gabon birds laid in all months except July and August, with peaks in March–May and September–December. The peaks corresponded to the local rainy seasons. Incubation takes about 20 days. Chicks are independent about forty days after hatch. As with other ibises, chicks are semi-altricial; they are born with blackish-brown down that is replaced at six days by thicker white down.

== Conservation ==
Like many other birds in the Guineo-Congolian region the spot-breasted ibis is subject to habitat loss and fragmentation. Deforestation has destroyed much of the dense rain forest these birds prefer. Hunters have also had a negative impact on the success of this species. The database entry includes justification for why this species is Least Concern. For example, fishermen are known to take nestlings. Nonetheless, the species is considered not globally threatened.
