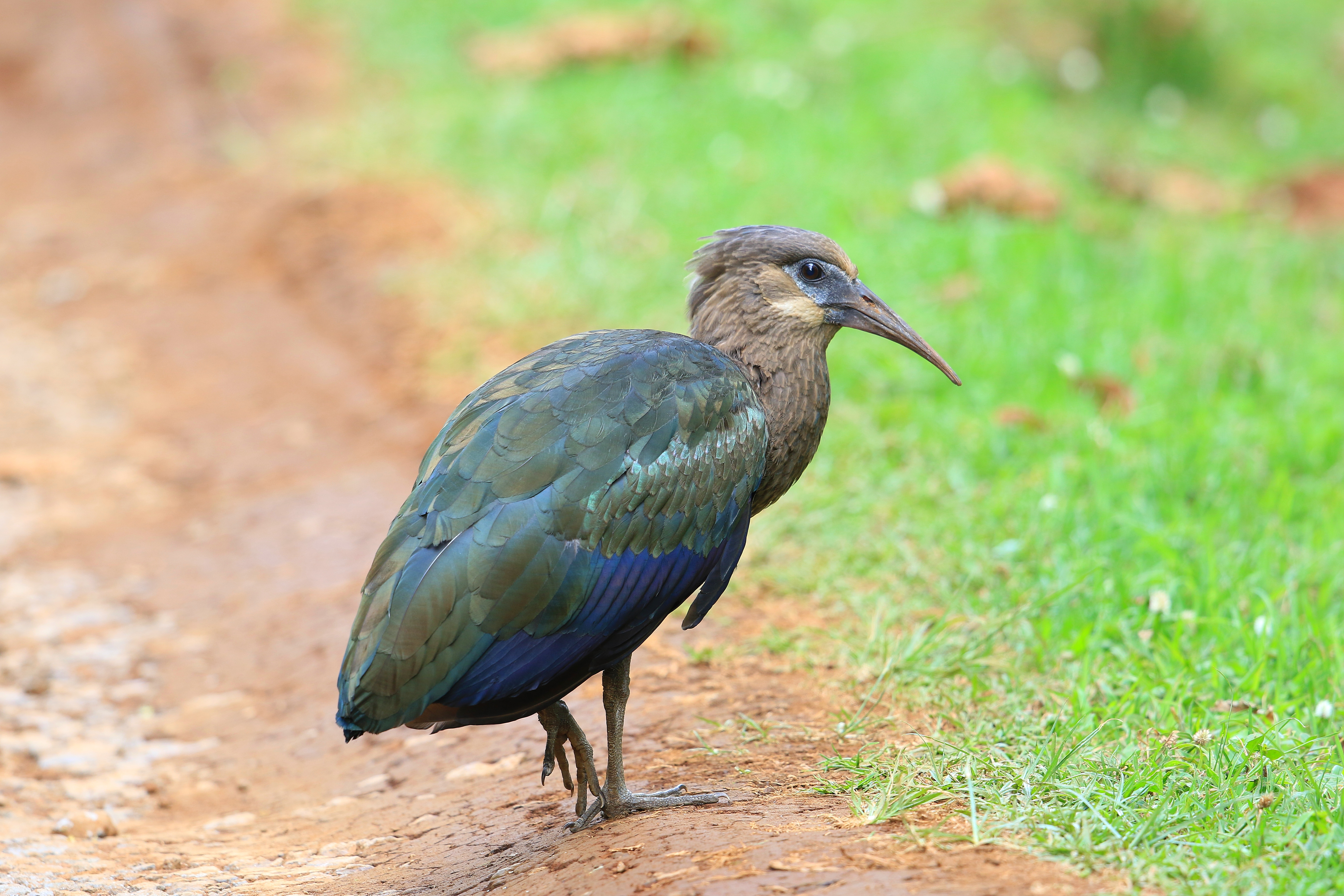
- Immature B. o. akleyorum at Mt Kenya – it lacks the long crest found in adults

Conservation status
- Least Concern (IUCN 3.1)

Scientific classification
- Kingdom: Animalia
- Phylum: Chordata
- Class: Aves
- Order: Pelecaniformes
- Family: Threskiornithidae
- Genus: Bostrychia
- Species: B. olivacea

Binomial name
- Bostrychia olivacea (Du Bus de Gisignies, 1838)
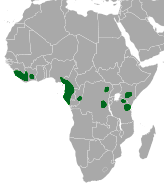
- Current extant resident distribution according to the IUCN (2012)

= Olive ibis =

Species of bird

The olive ibis (Bostrychia olivacea) is a species of ibis native to dense tropical forests in central Africa. Between 65 and 75 cm in length, it is a small ibis with olive plumage displaying an iridescent sheen. Four subspecies are recognized.

== Taxonomy and systematics ==
Historically, the olive ibis was included in various genera such as Geronticus, Comatibis and Harpiprion before finally being classified among the Bostrychia. It is also related to the Madagascar crested ibis Lophotibis cristata and Geronticus ibises.

Four subspecies of this ibis are currently recognised: Bostrychia olivacea olivacea, B. o. cupreipennis, B. o. akleyorum and B. o. rothschildi. The dwarf olive ibis Bostrychia bocagei of São Tomé was also formerly considered to be a subspecies of the olive ibis, but is now classified as a separate species because of its considerably smaller body size and different morphology.

The various subspecies inhabit different regions of Africa and despite differences in size and colouration; they are still regarded as belonging to the same species. These individual subspecies probably formed by geographic isolation through expansive grasslands or seas that separate each subspecies' forest habitat, hence preventing passage of individuals between the subpopulations. This probably also led to the formation of the dwarf olive ibis species of São Tomé.

== Description ==
=== Appearance ===
This relatively small ibis measures 65–75 cm in length, depending on subspecies. Recorded wing lengths in the various subspecies are 330–334 mm in olivacea, 309–355 mm in cupreipennis, 343–372 mm in akeleyorum, and 328 mm and 313 mm in males and females respectively of rothschildi. The culmen in olivacea measures 95–96 mm. Single male specimens of the subspecies akeleyorum, cupreipennis and rothschildi have reported culmen lengths of 108 mm, 85 mm and 95 mm respectively; with the corresponding lengths on females being 102 mm, 94 mm and 90 mm respectively.

B. o. cupreipennis and rothschildi are roughly equal in size, olivacea is slightly larger, and akleyorum is the largest of all subspecies and also has the longest bill. The number of available specimens of this species is however considered too small to confirm whether this pattern of size variation among the subspecies holds generally.

The adult plumage is dusky brown with green and bronze iridescent tinges. The head and neck are also brown, and pale stripes extend underneath the eye. The face around the orbital and loral regions is bluish black and the bill is coral red. The tail coverts and tail are dark blue. The back and rump are dusky greenish bronze. The secondary flight feathers and wing coverts stand out from the plumage through their pinkish green tinge. The colour of the legs and feet has been described as dull dark red, yellowish green or pinkish brown. The differing descriptions of soft part colourations probably refer to individuals in different stages of breeding.

Colouration differs slightly between the different subspecies. The plumage in the standard olivacea race is said to have a warm brown tone. The back in the akleyorum subspecies is greener than in the other subspecies, with wing coverts that are also green as opposed to coppery brown in olivacea. Cupreipennis has more green on the neck and body than in the olivacea subspecies. The rump in rothschildi is said to be purplish blue with olive green reflections.

The olive ibis has a distinctive brown crest which is purple near the neck, clearly distinguishing it at close range from the similar hadada and spot-breasted ibises. The purple is more extensive on the crest of rothschildi. The crest is not usually seen in flight because of the flyer's extended neck. The olive ibis and spot-breasted ibis are reportedly impossible to distinguish superficially in the field, but the akeleyorum subspecies appears heavier than the hadada ibis and has a thicker neck.

This ibis has a straggling but strong and powerful flight with a wingbeat that is apparently similar to that of night herons. It is very difficult to identify in the field and much more commonly seen when in flight at dawn and dusk. Flocks of the akeleyorum subspecies have been observed to fly high above the forests at about 800 ft, presumably en route to montane forests to roost. The natal young have uniformly brownish-black down, and their bare facial patches reportedly have the same pattern and spatial extent relative to the feathered tracts as those of adults. They however lack the long crest found in an adult.

=== Vocalisations ===
The call is a distinctive, loud, squawky "gar-wa", repeated several times and uttered in flight high above the trees. Reportedly, it only vocalizes in flight and then only during twilight. The rothschildi subspecies instead utters a call described as "HAAN-ha HAAN-ha". Other calls have been transcribed as "aka-a", "ka" and "kau". When threatened by an intruder, it repeatedly utters the "ga" element at the threat. Vocalisations at the nest have not been documented because the sound of rushing stream water may mask these noises. This ibis remains silent during the day when feeding in its typical habitat, so is difficult to detect at this time.

The call of the olive ibis also sounds harsh but measured, unlike the clamorous, three-syllable shrieking of the hadada ibis. The call of the spot-breasted ibis lacks the honking timbre of that of the olive ibis and the olive ibis does not emphasise the second note of its call as does the spot-breasted ibis. The pattern of the call is therefore a more reliable feature than superficial appearance by which to distinguish the olive ibis and spot-breasted ibis in the field.

== Distribution and habitat ==
This species is patchily distributed in dense forests from the West to East coast of tropical Africa. The countries in which it natively occurs are Cameroon, the RCongo, DRCongo, Côte d'Ivoire, Gabon, Ghana, Kenya, Liberia, Nigeria, Sierra Leone and Tanzania, besides Príncipe and São Tomé islands. Alongside its dense forest habitat, it has also been recorded in regenerating forest in Gabon and cliff holes.

The different subspecies inhabit different geographical regions in Africa. Bostrychia olivacea olivacea and B. o. cupreipennis occur in the west. The former is found in Upper Guinea in countries such as Sierra Leone, Liberia and Cote d'Ivoire; and the latter found in Lower Guinea in countries slightly further south such as Cameroon, Gabon, RCongo and DRCongo. B. o. cupreipennis is also found more toward central Africa than olivacea, which is more common on the western coast. B. o. rothschildi lives on Príncipe island and São Tomé.

B. o. akleyorum occurs in the montane forests of eastern Africa at altitudes of 1,800-12,000 m above sea level. It is found in the eastern DRCongo, on Mount Kenya and in the Aberdares of Kenya, Kilimanjaro in Tanzania, on Mount Meru and on Mount Elgon; but is apparently absent from lowland forests in east Africa such as the Kakamega tropical rainforest in Kenya. However, its call was once reportedly heard in the Bwamba lowlands of Uganda. It is readily distinguished from the similar hadada ibis by elevation of habitat since the latter occurs at altitudes in this region of less than 6,000 feet. The olive ibis may be the only resident African species to inhabit only lowland tropical forests in West Africa and only higher-altitude montane forests in the East.

The olive ibis is probably largely sedentary, although short migrations appear to happen in Liberia in extremely dry weather; during which individuals move from northern Grand Gedeh county to regions further south such as Glaro, Sapo and Sinoe.

== Behaviour and ecology ==
=== Feeding and roosting ===
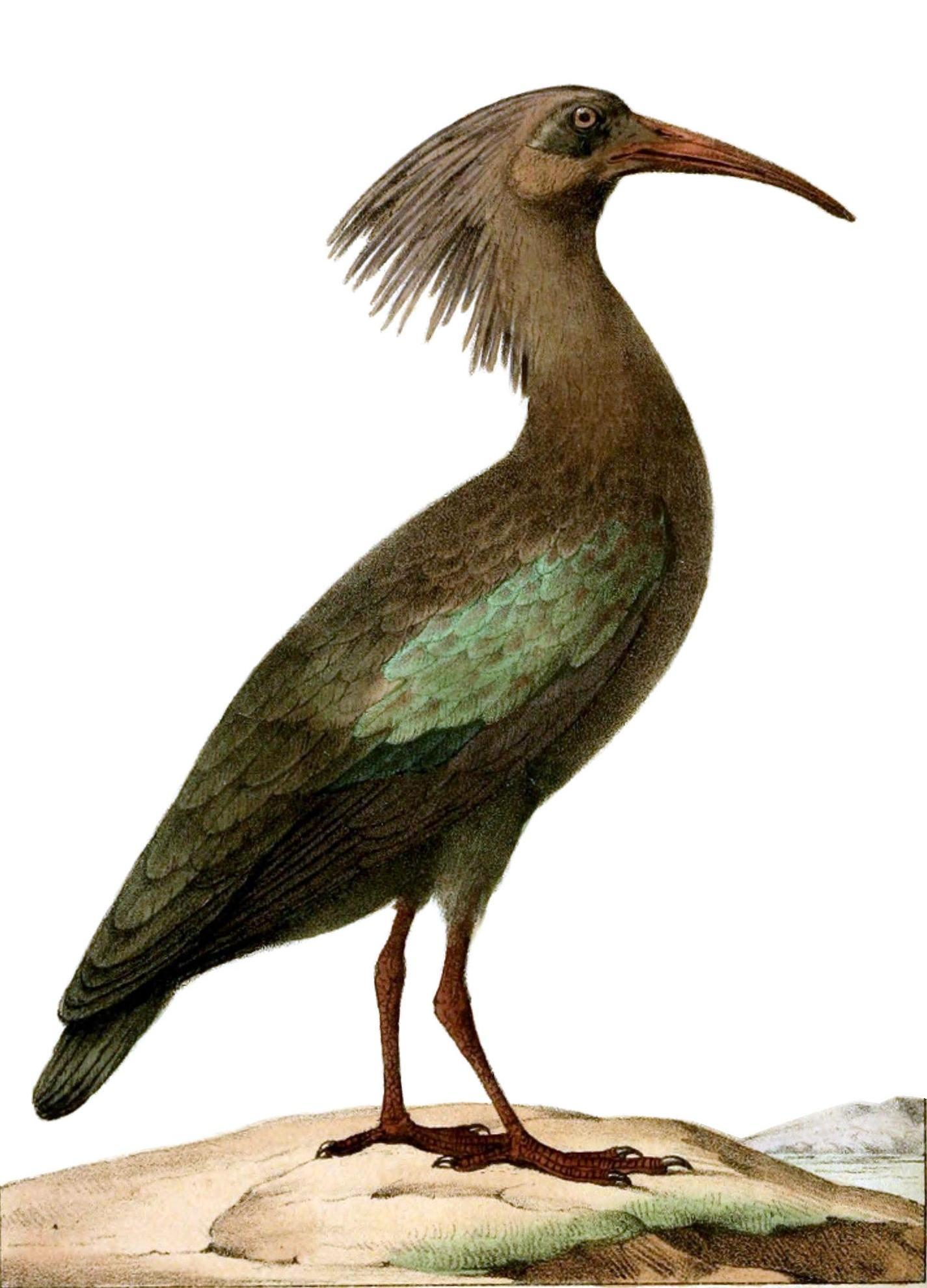
Illustration of an adult bird of the nominate subspecies – a native of the Upper Guinean forests

The olive ibis feeds on insects such as beetles, grubs and snails. It also reportedly feeds on myriapods, forest floor vegetation and snakes. It feeds singly, in pairs or in flocks usually comprising 5-12 individuals in densely forested areas along small stretches of fast flowing water, but also in mangroves, marshes, swamps and backwaters as well as larger rivers such as St. Paul's River in Liberia and Camma River in Gabon. Observations from the Hagenia forests of Kenya suggest that this ibis may preferentially forage on the forest floor with little or no undergrowth.

The olive ibis preferentially roosts in tops of large dead trees at night such as silk-cotton and probably uses the same ones daily. It apparently uses the same routes daily to fly between roosting and feeding grounds. When landing on a tree branch from flight, the ibis does not do so at right angles, but along the length of the branch and runs a short distance along the branch after landing.

=== Breeding ===
This ibis breeds solitarily. It was first recorded breeding in 1910 on Mount Kenya at 9,000 feet. Later breeding records of this ibis have been made adjacent to water in East Africa. One nest was discovered at the headwaters of the Pesi River in the northern Aberdares in mixed Juniperus/Podocarpus forest, and another at a streamlet near the Thiririka River in the southeastern Aberdares in mixed Podocarpus/Ocotea forest. In both cases, the nest measured 20–40 cm in diameter, was situated 2-4m above the surface of the water and precariously balanced in slender branches. Generally, the nest is loosely composed of dead branches supported on a tree limb and appears surprisingly unstable for a bird of its size. Additionally, both the male and female have been observed to silently construct the nest. Although only nests of akleyorum have been thus far discovered, those of the remaining subspecies are probably similar in structure and location (Chapin, 1932). The only breeding record in West Africa comes from Liberia in June.

From the few known breeding records in Kenya, egg-laying appears to take place from June to August. The clutch typically comprises three eggs. The egg is pea green with cinnamon rufous stains and chesnut-brown marks. It typically weighs about 50g and measures 56-58 x 40-41mm.

=== Threats and survival ===
This species is affected by hunting and habitat destruction through deforestation. Secondary threats probably include predation by forest birds and mammals such as the olive baboon Papio anubis and yellow baboon P. cynocephalus. However, the extent of all threats is unknown because the population of this ibis is largely undocumented.

When disturbed, the olive ibis makes no sound as it flies away and hides itself in thickly leaved trees.

== Relationship to humans ==
This ibis has reportedly never been kept in captivity, nor have live specimens ever been imported into Europe. However, numerous non-living specimens have been kept in museums around the world; such as in Brussels, Paris, Philadelphia, Leyden and Lisbon. Specimens of the akleyorum subspecies have also appeared in the Nairobi Museum and the British Museum.

== Status ==
The olive ibis is evaluated as Least Concern by the IUCN because the population does not apparently approach the threshold for Vulnerable under the range and population trend criteria.

Because this species is very secretive with largely inaccessible habitats, it has proved difficult to census. The world population has been conservatively estimated at 3,000-25,000 wild individuals. It is not globally threatened, but the putatively small world population is considered to be declining due to deforestation and hunting. However, the extent of its population decline is not considered large enough to render the world population Vulnerable. Because of the difficulty in identifying wild individuals, this species may be more common than documented; especially also considering its frequently heard vocalisations.

The rothschildi subspecies was believed to have become extinct on the island of Príncipe off the West African coast in 1901. However, this race was last reportedly sighted there in 1991; and a group of fewer than 10 wild individuals may remain on this island.
