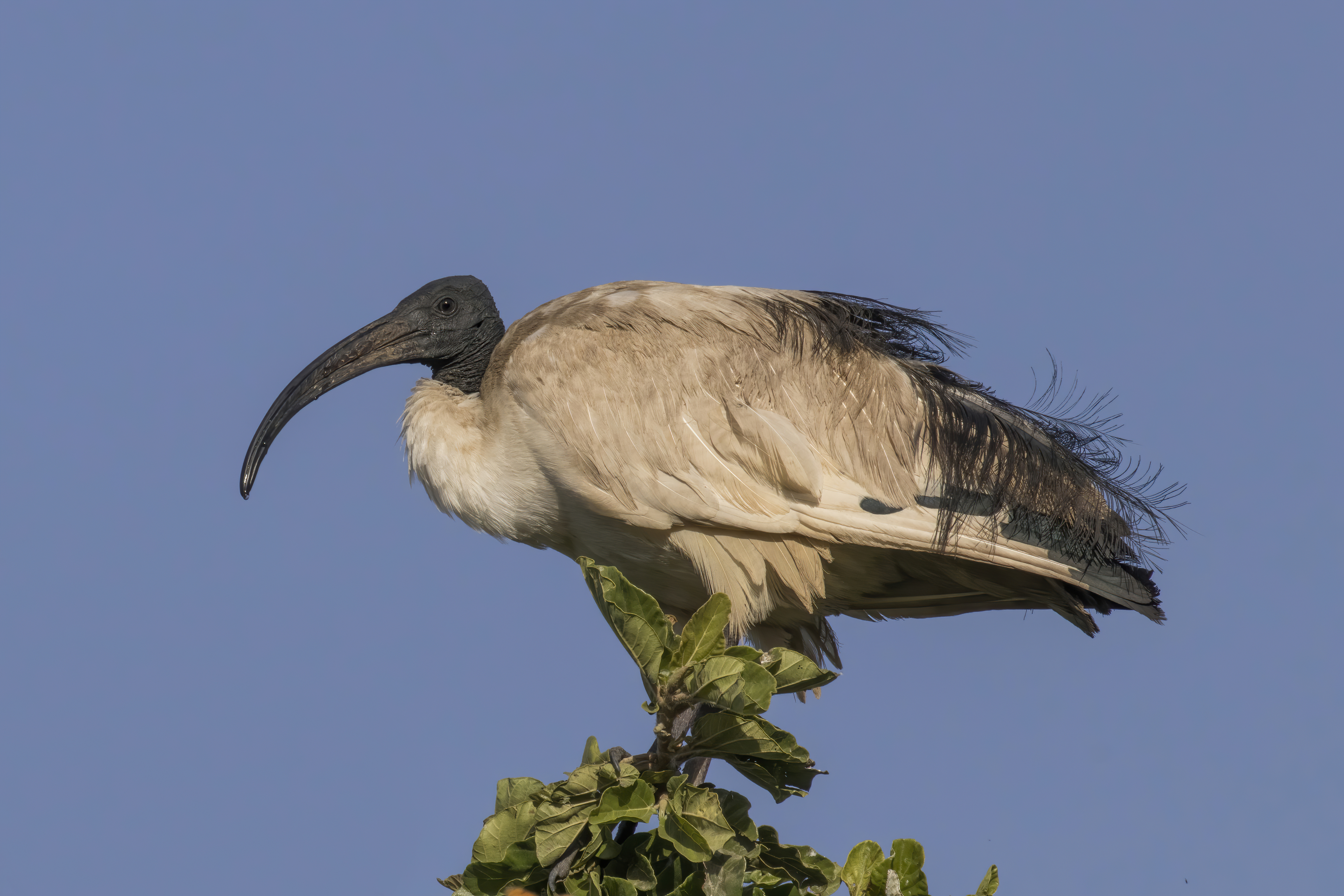
- African sacred ibis

Scientific classification
- Kingdom: Animalia
- Phylum: Chordata
- Class: Aves
- Order: Pelecaniformes
- Suborder: Ardei
- Family: Threskiornithidae; Poche, 1904

Genera
- Eudocimus Wagler 1832; Theristicus Wagler, 1832; Cercibis Wagler, 1832; Mesembrinibis Peters, 1930; Phimosus Wagler, 1832; Plegadis Kaup, 1829; Lophotibis Reichenbach, 1853; Bostrychia Gray, 1847; Nipponia Reichenbach, 1853; Geronticus Wagler, 1832; Pseudibis Hodgson, 1844; Platalea Linnaeus, 1758; Threskiornis Gray, 1842

= Threskiornithidae =

Threskiornithidae Temporal range: Early Eocene to present

Family of birds

The family Threskiornithidae includes 35 extant species of large wading birds, and one more that became extinct in historical times. The family has been traditionally classified into two subfamilies, the ibises and the spoonbills; however, recent genetic studies have cast doubt on this arrangement, and have found the spoonbills to be nested within the Old World ibises, and the New World ibises as an early offshoot. These studies found two major clades within the family, a widespread clade that includes the type genus Threskiornis and seven other genera (including the spoonbills) occurring in both the Old and New Worlds, and a smaller group of entirely New World species, with five genera.

== Taxonomy ==
The spoonbills and ibises were once thought to be related to other groups of long-legged wading birds in the order Ciconiiformes, until genetic studies found that they are members of the order Pelecaniformes. In response to these findings, the International Ornithological Congress (IOC) reclassified Threskiornithidae and their sister taxon Ardeidae under the order Pelecaniformes, instead of the previous order of Ciconiiformes, in 2010.

A study of mitochondrial DNA of the spoonbills plus the sacred and scarlet ibises found that the spoonbills formed a clade with old world genus Threskiornis, with Nipponia nippon and Eudocimus as progressively earlier offshoots and more distant relatives, and hence casts doubt on the arrangement of the family into ibis and spoonbill subfamilies. Subsequent studies have supported these findings, the spoonbills forming a monophyletic clade within the "widespread" clade of ibises, including Plegadis and Threskiornis, while the "new World Endemic" clade is formed by the genera restricted to the Americas such as Eudocimus and Theristicus.

Ibises are a rather old group, with well-preserved definitive fossils known as far back as the Eocene (Rhynchaeites), and potential members dating as far back as the Late Paleocene (Dakotornis).

== Description ==
Members of the family have long, broad wings with 11 primary feathers and about 20 secondaries. They are strong fliers and, rather surprisingly, given their size and weight, very capable soarers. The body tends to be elongated, the neck more so, with rather long legs. The bill is also long, decurved in the case of the ibises, straight and distinctively flattened in the spoonbills. They are large birds, but mid-sized by the standards of their order, ranging from the São Tomé ibis (Bostrychia bocagei), at 45 cm (18 in) and 450 g (0.99 lb), to the giant ibis (Pseudibis gigantea), at 100 cm (39 in) and 4.2 kg (9.3 lb).

== Distribution and ecology ==
They are distributed in tropical and warm temperate regions almost worldwide, being found near almost any area of standing or slow-flowing fresh or brackish water away from cool temperate and arctic zones. Ibises are also found in drier areas, including using human detritus in landfills by some species, and semi-desert fields by the northern bald ibis. The northernmost occurrence is Eurasian spoonbill, breeding north to 57°N in northern Denmark, and the southernmost is black-faced ibis, south to 55°S in Tierra del Fuego.

The Llanos are notable in that these wetland plains support seven species of ibis in the one region.

Ibises and spoonbills feed on a wide range of invertebrates and small vertebrates; ibises by probing in soft earth or mud, spoonbills by swinging the bill from side to side in shallow water. They roost in trees near water, or standing in shallow water. They are gregarious, feeding, roosting, and flying together, often in formation.

Nesting is colonial in large or small groups or occasionally singly, nearly always in trees overhanging water, but sometimes on islands or small islands in swamps. Generally, the female builds a large structure out of reeds and sticks brought by the male. The typical clutch size is two to five; hatching is asynchronic. Both sexes incubate in shifts, and after hatching feed the young by partial regurgitation. Two or three weeks after hatching, the young no longer need to be brooded continuously and may leave the nest, often forming creches but returning to be fed by the parents.

== Species ==
There are 35 extant species of ibis and spoonbill, and one (Réunion ibis) that became extinct in historical times.

Image	Genus	Species
	Eudocimus Wagler, 1832	Scarlet ibis, Eudocimus ruber; American white ibis, Eudocimus albus
	Theristicus Wagler, 1832	Plumbeous ibis, Theristicus caerulescens; Buff-necked ibis, Theristicus caudatus; Black-faced ibis, Theristicus melanopis; Andean ibis, Theristicus branickii
	Cercibis Wagler, 1832	Sharp-tailed ibis, Cercibis oxycerca
	Mesembrinibis J.L. Peters, 1930	Green ibis, Mesembrinibis cayennensis
	Phimosus Wagler, 1832	Bare-faced ibis, Phimosus infuscatus
	Plegadis Kaup, 1829	Glossy ibis, Plegadis falcinellus; White-faced ibis, Plegadis chihi; Puna ibis, Plegadis ridgwayi
	Lophotibis L. Reichenbach, 1853	Madagascar ibis, Lophotibis cristata
	Bostrychia G.R. Gray, 1847	Olive ibis, Bostrychia olivacea; São Tomé ibis, Bostrychia bocagei; Spot-breasted ibis, Bostrychia rara; Hadada ibis, Bostrychia hagedash; Wattled ibis, Bostrychia carunculata
	Nipponia Reichenbach, 1850	Crested ibis, Nipponia nippon
	Geronticus Wagler, 1832	Northern bald ibis, Geronticus eremita; Southern bald ibis, Geronticus calvus
	Pseudibis Hodgson, 1844	Red-naped ibis, Pseudibis papillosa; White-shouldered ibis, Pseudibis davisoni; Giant ibis, Pseudibis gigantea
	Platalea Linnaeus, 1758	Roseate spoonbill, Platalea ajaja; Yellow-billed spoonbill, Platalea flavipes; African spoonbill, Platalea alba; Eurasian spoonbill, Platalea leucorodia; Royal spoonbill, Platalea regia; Black-faced spoonbill, Platalea minor
	Threskiornis G.R. Gray, 1842	African sacred ibis, Threskiornis aethiopicus; Malagasy sacred ibis, Threskiornis bernieri; †Reunion ibis, Threskiornis solitarius (extinct); Black-headed ibis, Threskiornis melanocephalus; Australian white ibis, Threskiornis molucca; Straw-necked ibis, Threskiornis spinicollis

=== Fossil genera ===
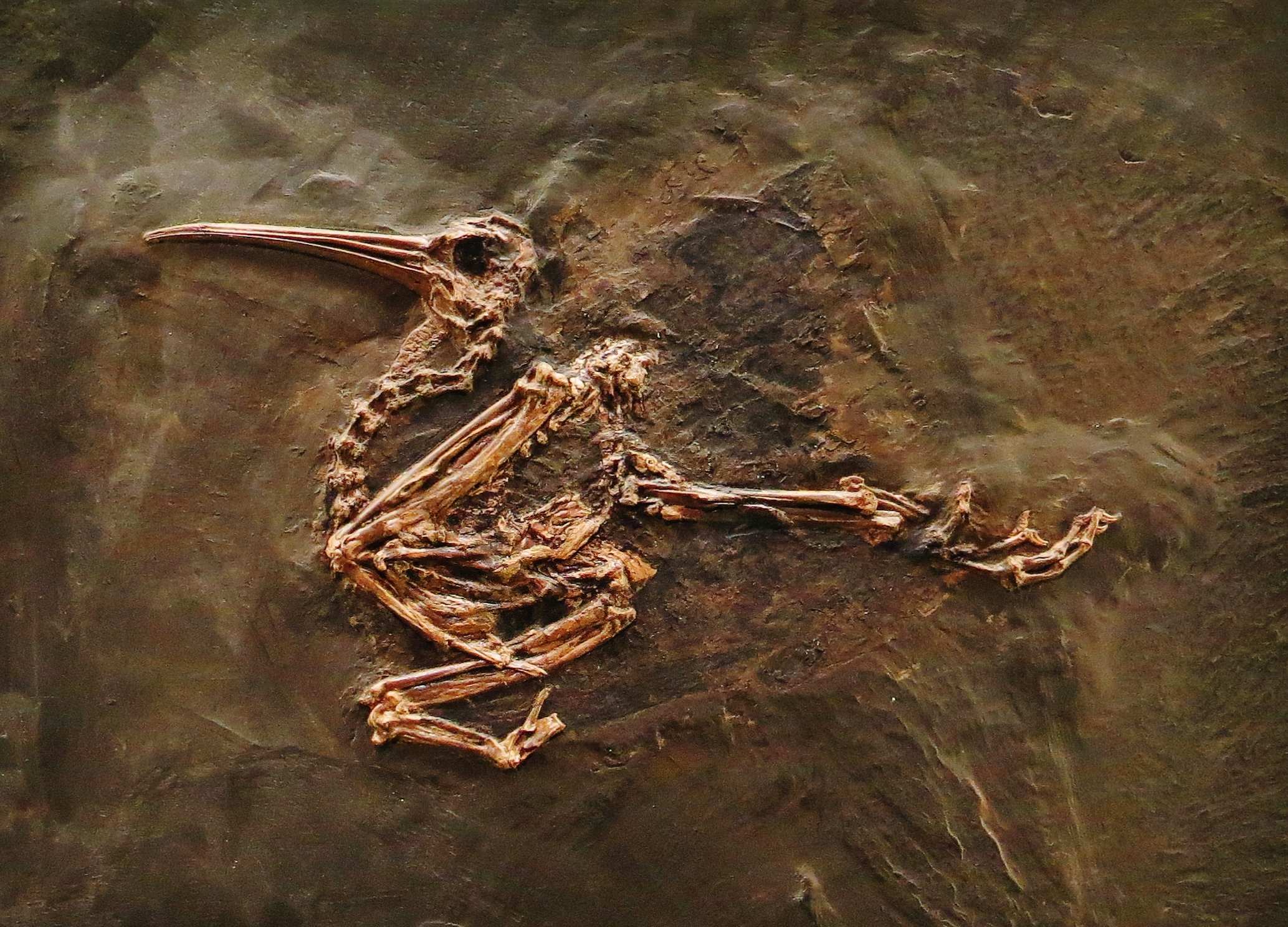
Rhynchaeites, a stem-ibis from the Messel Formation of Germany

The following fossil genera are known:

- Actiornis (Late Eocene of England)
- Apteribis. Several species of flightless ibises from Hawaii.
- ?Dakotornis (Late Paleocene of North Dakota, US)
- Gerandibis. Discovered in France. It is the sole species known for this genera.
- ?Minggangia (Late Eocene of China)
- Rhynchaeites (Early to Middle Eocene of England and Germany, potentially Denmark and Wyoming, US)
- ?Vadaravis (Early Eocene of Wyoming, US)
- Xenicibis. Discovered in Jamaica.
