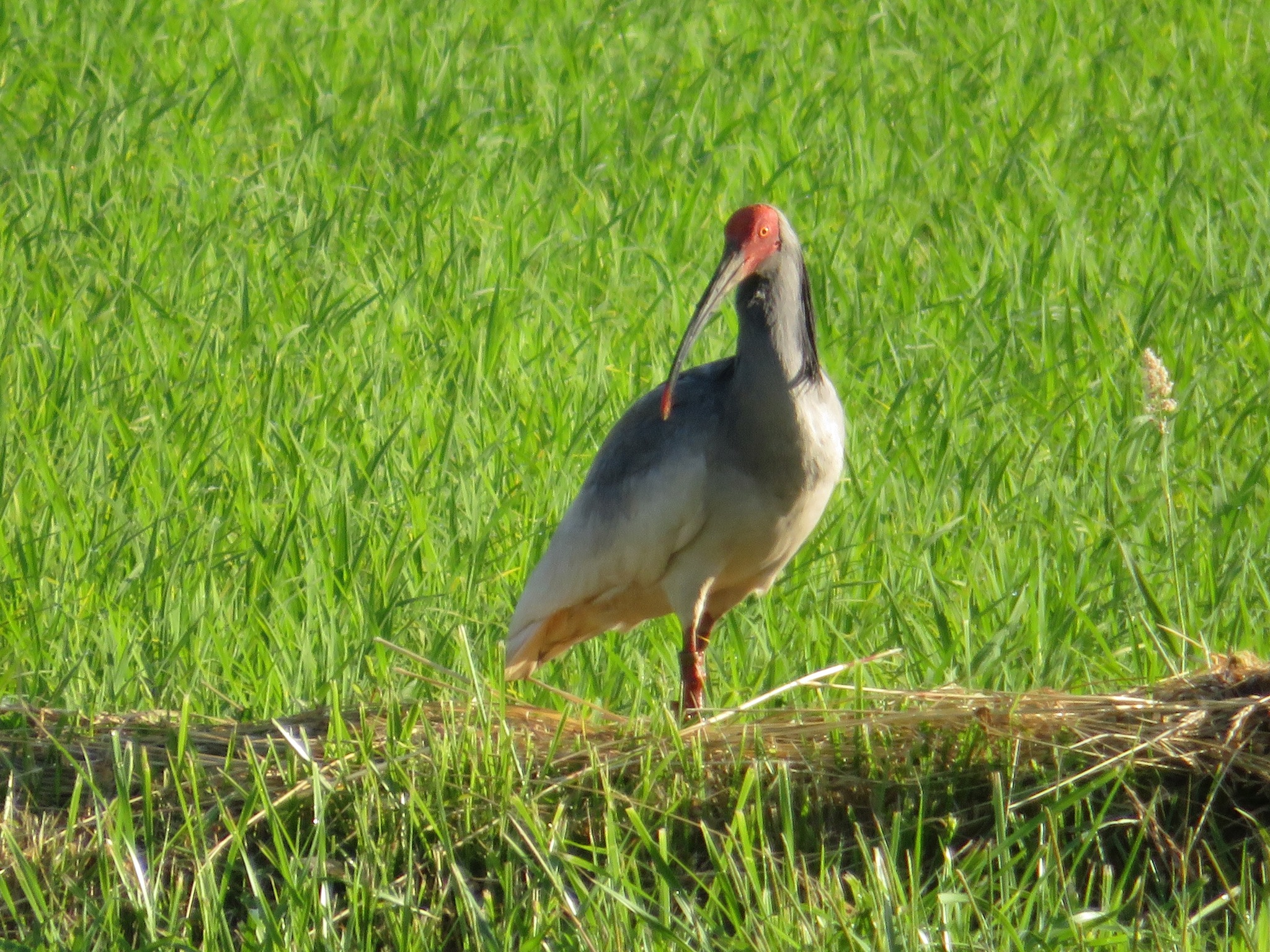

Conservation status
- Endangered (IUCN 3.1)
- CITES Appendix I

Scientific classification
- Kingdom: Animalia
- Phylum: Chordata
- Class: Aves
- Order: Pelecaniformes
- Family: Threskiornithidae
- Genus: Nipponia; Reichenbach, 1853
- Species: N. nippon

Binomial name
- Nipponia nippon (Temminck, 1835)
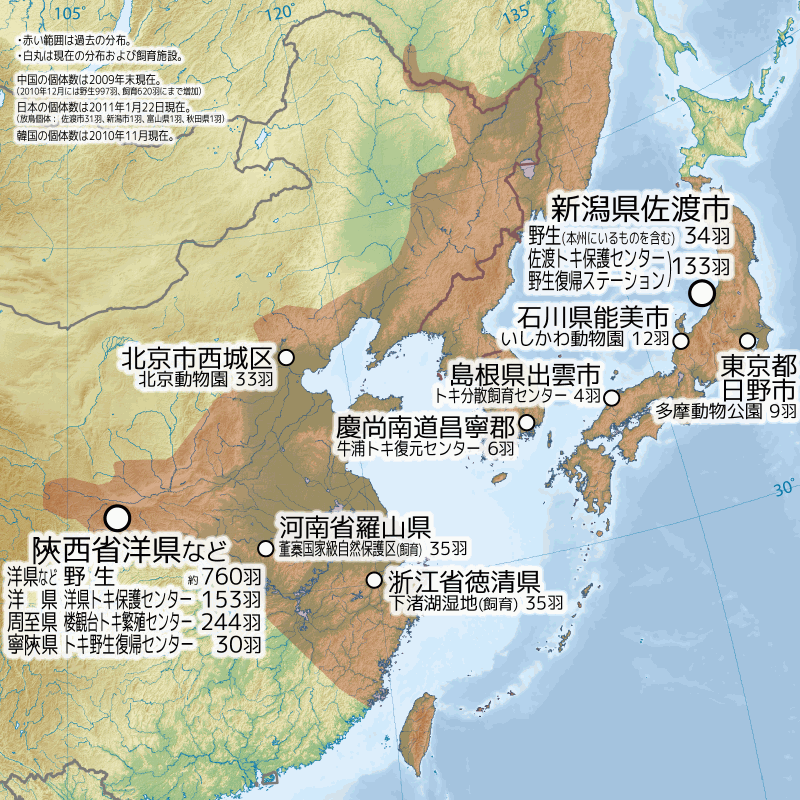
- former natural range

Synonyms
- Ibis nippon Temminck, 1835; Ibis temmincki Reichenbach, 1850; Nipponia temmincki (Reichenbach, 1850)

= Crested ibis =

Species of bird

The crested ibis in captivity and in the wild on Sado Island, 2025

The crested ibis (Nipponia nippon), also called the Japanese crested ibis, Asian crested ibis or toki (トキ), is a species of bird in the ibis family, Threskiornithidae. It is the only species in the genus Nipponia.

The crested ibis was once widespread across eastern China, the Korean Peninsula, and Japan, but by the late 20th century its wild population had become restricted to Yangxian in Shaanxi Province, China. Reintroduction programs have since established populations in South Korea and in Japan on Sado Island and the Noto Peninsula.

== Description ==
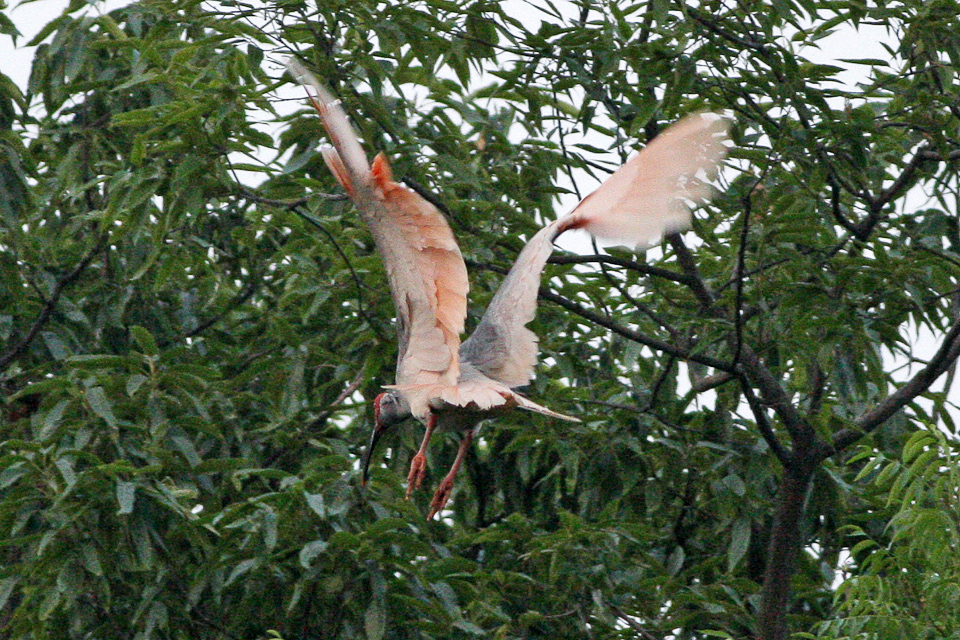
In flight showing the pink underwing

It is a medium-sized to large ibis, 55–78.5 cm (21.7–30.9 in) long, with a bare red face, and a dense crest of plumes on the nape. The plumage varies with seasons; in winter, it is largely white with salmon-pink tones on the wings and tail; in summer, it is pale grey above and on the breast, with a darker grey shawl across its back, and white with a salmon-pink tinge below. In flight, the upper side of the wings and tail are white; the underside of the flight feathers on the wing and tail are strongly flushed pink. The bill is long and strongly downcurved, black with a red tip; the legs and feet are red. Juveniles have downy feathers on the cheeks, while the rest of the face is bare and orange-yellow. The plumage is tinged with smoky gray and has a rosy sheen. The legs are pale brown, and the iris is light yellowish-brown.

== Habitat ==
The crested ibis inhabits temperate mountain forests and hilly regions, and is frequently active near rice paddies, riverbanks, ponds, marshes, and mountain streams. It typically nests in tall trees close to wetlands.

== Behavior ==
The crested ibis is generally solitary and quiet, vocalizing mainly when taking flight and rarely during other activities. Individuals are most often observed alone, in pairs, or small groups, and seldom associate with other bird species. Its movements are slow and deliberate, and flight is characterized by steady, deliberate wingbeats with the head and neck extended forward and the legs stretched backward, not protruding beyond the tail. Crested ibises are diurnal, spending the day foraging in wetlands and roosting at night in tall trees.

== Breeding ==
Breeding season is from March to May. Nests are built in mountain forests with minimal disturbance, positioned on the branches of tall chestnut, poplar, pine, and other trees near water bodies. The nest is relatively crude and simple, primarily constructed from dead branches and lined with soft grass leaves, stems, and moss. Each clutch contains 2–5 eggs, typically 3. The eggs are oval-shaped, bluish-gray with brown spots. Incubation begins in April and is shared by both parents, lasting 28–30 days. The birds exhibit strong territoriality, defending their territory during the breeding season. After hatching, both parents feed the chicks, which gain the ability to fly and leave the nest for 45–50 days of feeding. When the chicks grow large enough to leave the nest, they remain near the nesting area with their parents for foraging and activities, typically leaving the nesting grounds after July. Sexual maturity occurs around 3 years of age, and in captivity, they can live over 17 years.

== Diet ==
Crested ibis's diet usually consists of small fish, loaches, frogs, crabs, shrimp, snails, crickets, earthworms, beetles, hemipteran insects, crustaceans, and other invertebrates and small vertebrates such as insect larvae. Foraging occurs during daylight hours. It typically forages in shallow waters near water's edge or in rice paddies, though it is also observed foraging in muddy areas and on land. When foraging on land, it often moves slowly and quietly, scanning the ground ahead with its eyes. Upon discovering food, it immediately pecks at it with its beak. When foraging in shallow water or mud, it primarily relies on repeatedly inserting its long, curved beak into the soil and water to probe for food.

== Distribution ==
The crested ibis was once widely distributed in China, spanning the Ussuri River basin and Lake Xingkai in Heilongjiang Province, northeastern China; eastern, central, and western Jilin Province; Dalian, Jin County, and Yingkou on the Liaodong Peninsula in Liaoning Province; Hebei Province; western Henan Province; Shandong Province; southeastern Shaanxi Province; Mount Taiabai and Yangxian County in southern Shaanxi Province; Lanzhou and southeastern Huixian in Gansu, Anhui, Qu County in Zhejiang, as well as Fuzhou and Hainan Island. They also nested in the Russian Far East, Japan, and was a non-breeding visitor to the Korean Peninsula and Taiwan. However, it is now only found in Yangxian County, Shaanxi.

== Migration ==
Populations originally breeding in eastern Russia, North Korea, northern Japan, and northern China typically migrate southward in autumn to overwinter in southern Japan and areas south of the Yellow River in China, extending to the lower Yangtze River, Fujian, Taiwan, and Hainan Island. Some individuals remain in North Korea for the winter. In contrast, populations breeding in southern China and Japan are generally non-migratory, serving as resident birds. The population currently distributed in Yangxian County, Shaanxi Province, China, also exhibits non-migratory behavior, wandering locally after the breeding season.

== Conservation ==
The last wild crested ibis in Japan died in October 2003, with the remaining wild population found only in Shaanxi Province of China, until the reintroduction of captive bred birds back into Japan in 2008. They were previously thought to be extinct in China as well, until their rediscovery in 1981. Extensive captive breeding programs have been developed by Japan and China to conserve the species. They are on China's State Protection List. In 2002, there were a total of 130 colonies in China. Northwest Shaanxi province's research center has a history of 26 crested ibis fledglings including artificial and natural incubation. On July 31, 2002, five out of seven crested ibis chicks hatched at an incubation center in northwest Shaanxi province. This was the highest ever recorded number of chicks that hatched. The parents of the chicks were chosen from 60 ibis pairs raised at that research center.

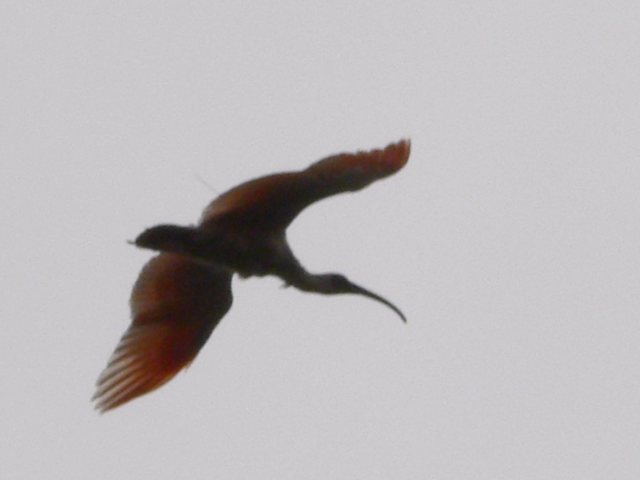
Crested ibis near Crested Ibis Conservation Center on Sado Island

In the 1980s, the birds were decimated by overhunting, the use of pesticides, ongoing habitat loss, their already small population size, their limited range, winter starvation and persecution, which together brought the endangered species to the brink of extinction. The crested ibis has been listed in Appendix I of the conservation treaty CITES.

The London Zoo had crested ibises from 1872 until 1873. Outside China, only Japan and South Korea currently keep the species.

== Reintroductions ==
=== Japan ===
On September 25, 2008, in Sado, Niigata, the Sado Japanese Crested Ibis Preservation Center released 10 of the birds as part of its crested ibis restoration program, which aimed to introduce 60 ibises into the wild by 2015. It was the first time the bird has returned to the Japanese wild since 1981.

On April 23, 2012, it was confirmed that three crested ibis chicks had hatched on Sado Island in Niigata Prefecture, the first time chicks had hatched in the wild in Japan in 36 years.

On June 23, 2022, nearly five hundred toki returned to Sado, where the birds now draw tourists. This instance has been cited as a conservation success story when one in eight bird species globally are threatened with extinction, having involved international diplomacy as well as an agricultural revolution on a small island off Japan's west coast.

=== South Korea ===
On the Korean Peninsula, the bird has not been present since it was last seen in 1979 near the Korean Demilitarized Zone (DMZ). South Korea made efforts to restore the species after former CCP general secretary Hu Jintao delivered a pair of the birds as a present during a South Korea–China summit in 2008, and CCP general secretary Xi Jinping presented another pair in 2013. The restoration center in Changnyeong has bred more than 360 crested ibises so far. The South Korean government has released dozens of crested ibises into the wild to promote its efforts to preserve biological diversity.

Reintroduced ibises were first recorded breeding in South Korea in 2021, with sporadic nesting records in following years.

== See also ==
- List of Special Places of Scenic Beauty, Special Historic Sites and Special Natural Monuments – the crested ibis is listed
