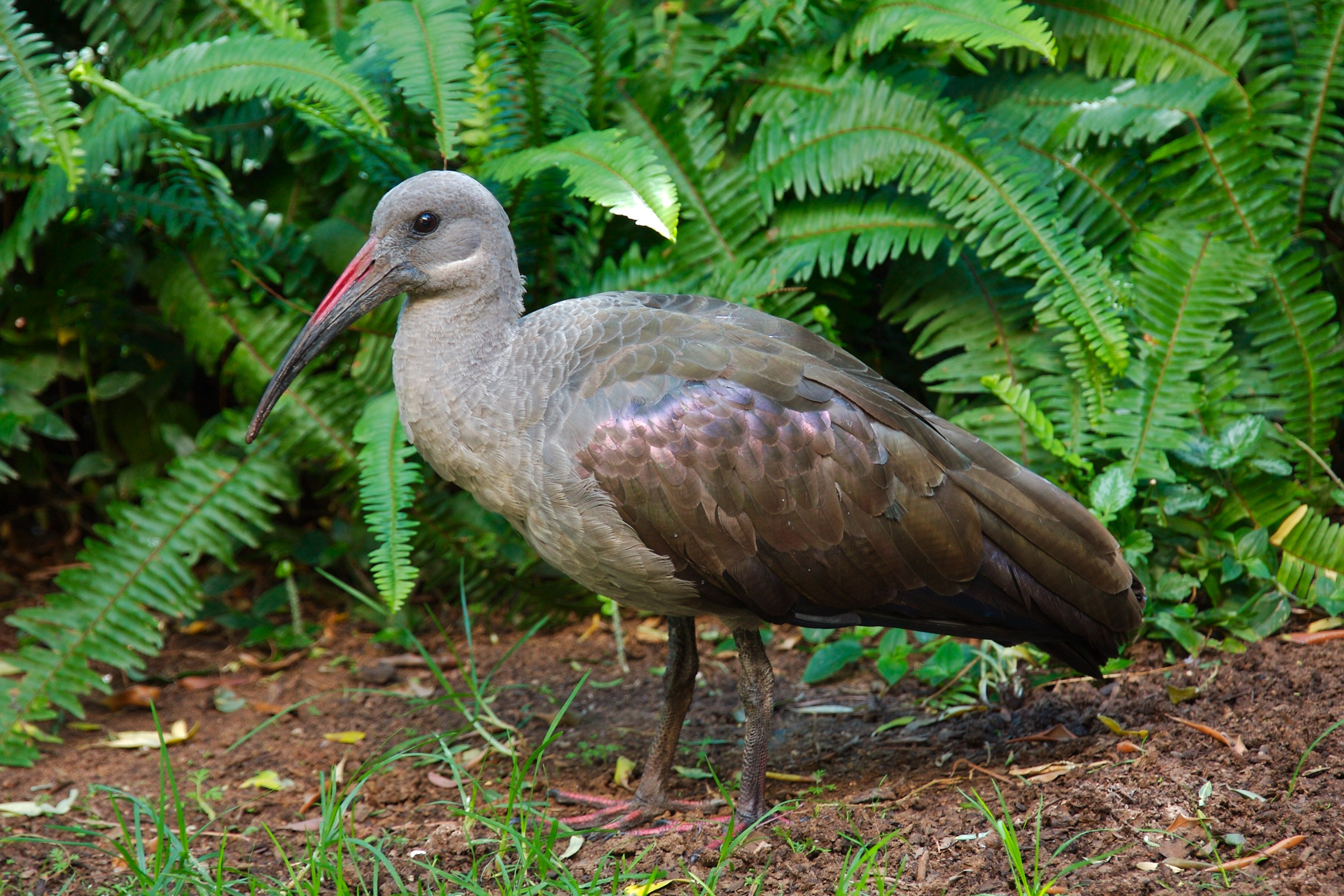
- Bostrychia hagedash

Scientific classification
- Kingdom: Animalia
- Phylum: Chordata
- Class: Aves
- Order: Pelecaniformes
- Family: Threskiornithidae
- Subfamily: Threskiornithinae
- Genus: Bostrychia; G.R. Gray, 1847

Type species
- Ibis carunculata (Rüppell, 1837)

= Bostrychia =

Genus of birds

Bostrychia is a genus of ibises in the family Threskiornithidae. Member species are found in many countries throughout Africa.

== Species ==
It contains the following five species:

Image	Scientific name	Common name	Distribution
	Bostrychia carunculata	Wattled ibis	Ethiopia
	Bostrychia hagedash	Hadada ibis	Sudan, Burundi, Ethiopia, Senegal, Uganda, Tanzania, Gabon, Democratic Republic of Congo, Cameroon, Gambia, Kenya, Somalia, Lesotho, Eswatini, Botswana, Mozambique, Zimbabwe and South Africa.
	Bostrychia olivacea	Olive ibis	Cameroon, Democratic Republic of the Congo, Republic of the Congo, Côte d'Ivoire, Gabon, Ghana, Kenya, Liberia, Nigeria, Sierra Leone, Zaire, Tanzania and São Tomé and Príncipe Island
	Bostrychia bocagei	São Tomé ibis	São Tomé
	Bostrychia rara	Spot-breasted ibis	Angola, Cameroon, Central African Republic, the Republic of the Congo, the Democratic Republic of the Congo, Ivory Coast, Equatorial Guinea, Gabon, Ghana, Guinea, Liberia, Nigeria, Sierra Leone, and Uganda

== Conservation ==
Four of these species are evaluated as Least Concern status, but the dwarf olive ibis is Critically Endangered according to the IUCN.
