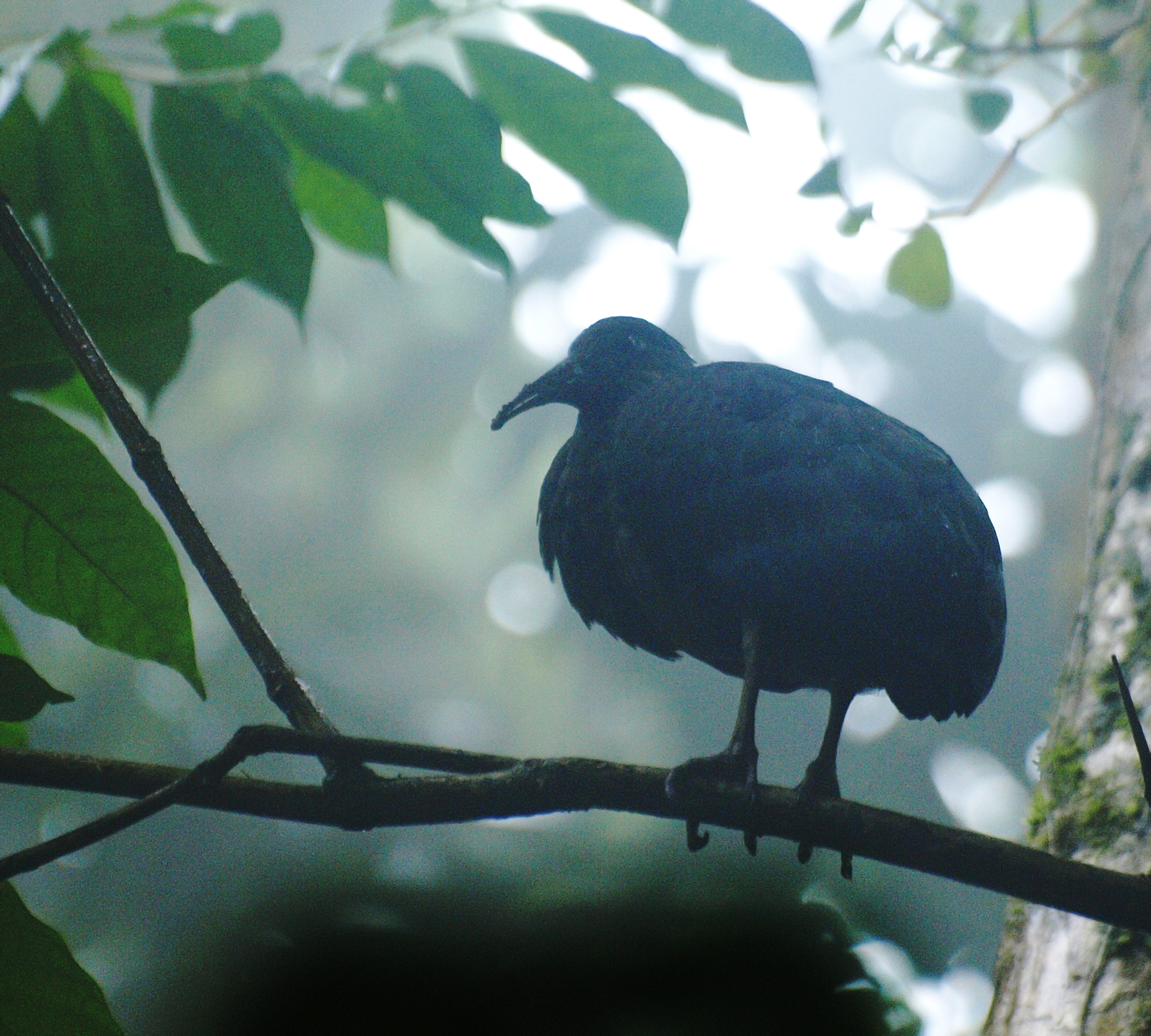

Conservation status
- Critically Endangered (IUCN 3.1)

Scientific classification
- Kingdom: Animalia
- Phylum: Chordata
- Class: Aves
- Order: Pelecaniformes
- Family: Threskiornithidae
- Genus: Bostrychia
- Species: B. bocagei

Binomial name
- Bostrychia bocagei (Chapin, 1923)
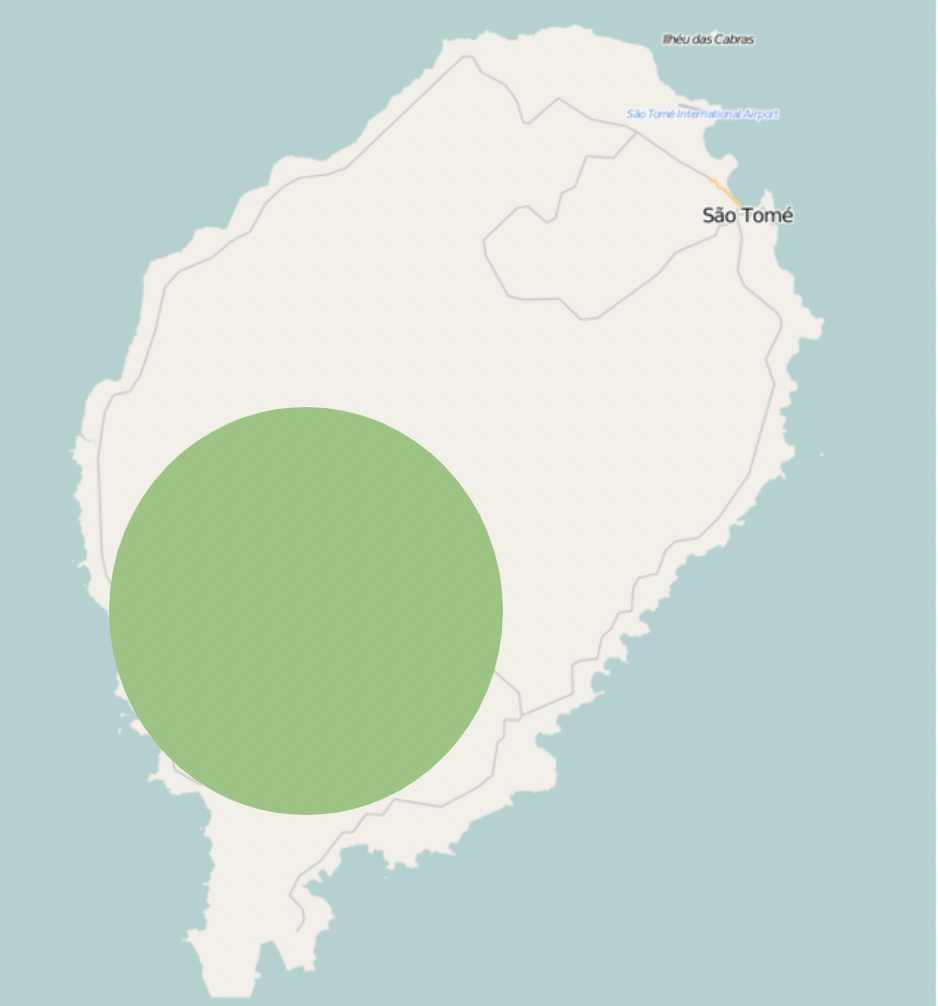
- Range map of the distribution of the dwarf ibis on the island of São Tomé

= São Tomé ibis =

Species of bird

The São Tomé ibis (Bostrychia bocagei), also known as the dwarf olive ibis or the dwarf ibis, is a critically endangered bird that is endemic to São Tomé off the western coast of Central Africa in the Gulf of Guinea. Discovered in the 1800s by Francisco Newton, it was once thought to be a subspecies of the larger olive ibis, but is now classified as a distinct species.

Living with 19 other species of endemic birds on the island, the dwarf ibis is one of 10 that are threatened for extinction. B. bocagei prefers the southern forests almost exclusively living there in nests that are high up in the trees to avoid predators. Aside from predation, other common threats to the species include overhunting and habitat loss as a result of overexploitation of resources by the people of São Tomé. Although no specific conservation reforms have been enacted to help B. bocagei, indirect efforts to help biodiversity on São Tomé in general have been instituted, such as the ECOFAC program and the establishment of a national park.

== Description ==
The São Tomé ibis measures 248 mm on its wings, 75 mm on its bill, 52 mm on its tarsus, and 95 mm on its tail, on average. The head is a dull olive color with black surrounding the eyes and the base of the bill. The tectrix (wing coverts) and mantle of the bird are slightly bronzed.

Most of the time, the dwarf ibis is silent, but when it is disturbed, it gives off differing coughed grunts. When going to roost, it lets out a harsh honking. Its call could also be described as a stressed Walalalala.

== Behavior ==
B. Bocagei chooses to nest between 8m and 16m up in the trees in the forests. The nests were composed primarily of twigs and other biomass material, with leaves and feathers lining the inside. The nests had diameters of between 330 and 370 mm x 260–360 mm.

== Habitat and ecology ==
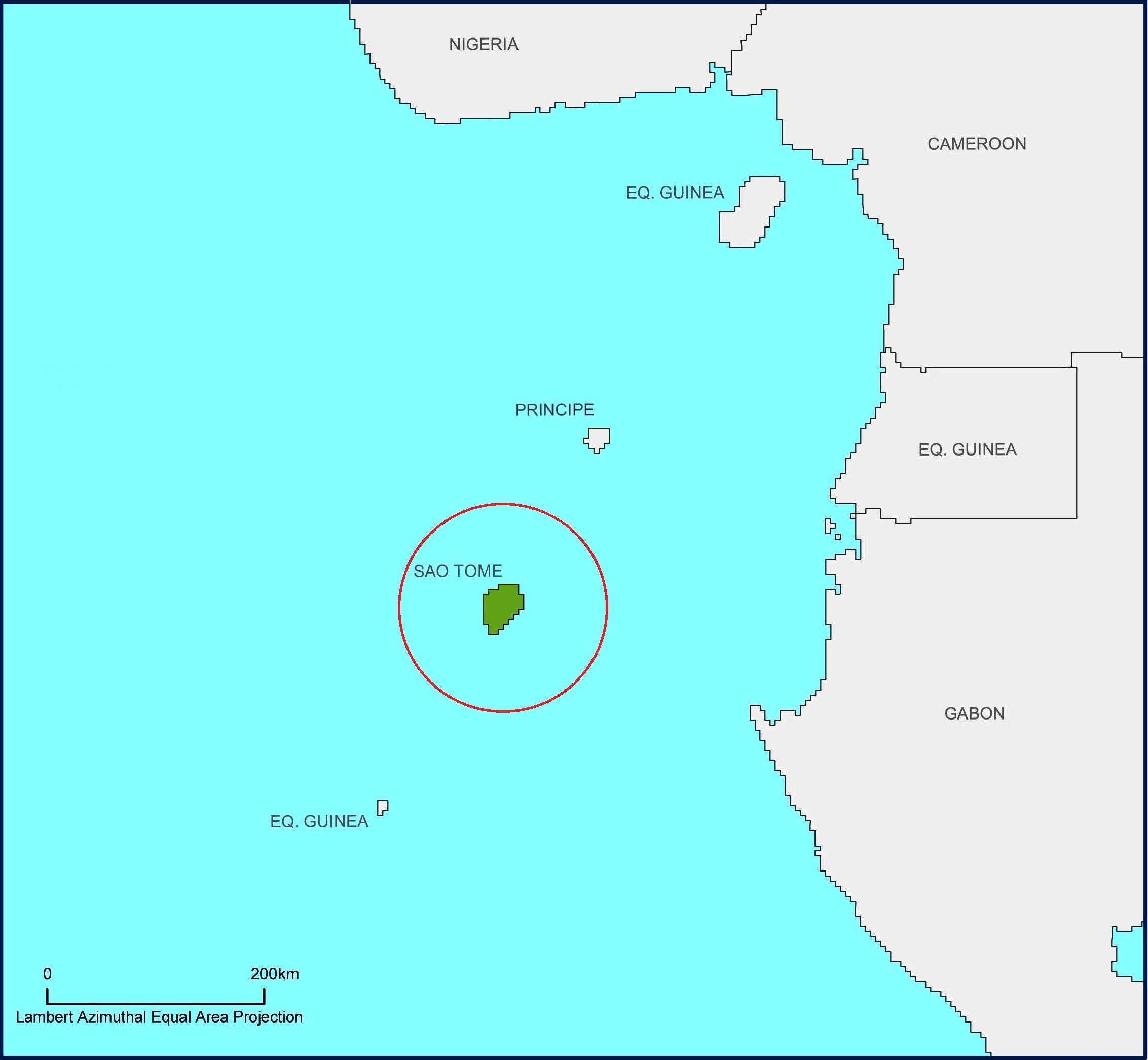
The island of São Tomé off the coast of Africa

The São Tomé ibis was discovered in the late 1800s by Francisco Newton, a Portuguese collector, inhabiting the island of São Tomé off the coast of Western Africa. Alongside 19 other endemic species of birds, the São Tomé ibis is one of the 10 that are threatened for extinction, but little has been done to protect the island's very high biodiversity. It is found in primary forest below 450 m altitude, being seen almost exclusively in the southern forests. The decision of the ibis to nest higher up is related to predation avoidance. The nests appear both higher up and away from running water, most likely to avoid snakes and introduced mammals that could exploit the eggs, such as rats and Mona monkeys. Recently, it has been seen more and more in the newly created Obô Natural Park, which spans the majority of the western side of the island. It forages for food on the forest floor with sparse undergrowth, especially where the ground has been disturbed by feral pigs, and in swampy areas bordering watercourses.

== Threats ==
The extremely small population of São Tomé ibises contains between 50 and 249 individuals. Due to this, it is listed as Critically Endangered on the IUCN Red List. A neighboring subspecies of the São Tomé ibis on the island of Príncipe became extinct in the last century, indicating that small habitats like São Tomé make ibises more vulnerable to threats and extinction. The São Tomé ibis is facing problems that are both environmental and anthropogenic that contribute to its status as critically endangered.

=== Anthropogenic ===
In total, approximately 75% of the native flora of São Tomé has been lost since its colonization in the 1500s. Living in the Anthropocene, the São Tomé ibis suffers from anthropogenic factors, including habitat destruction, overhunting, and urbanization. In efforts to urbanize the small island, railroads and roads have been built, bringing down forests with it. Additionally, dams are being constructed to provide electricity to the surrounding communities. The most significant part of urbanization is the development of oil-palm concessions. Oil-palm concessions are the licensing of specific land by governmental organizations to companies to build oil palm plantations. Aside from oil-palm plants, cacao, coffee, quinine, and cinnamon plantations have been built on the island. While building these plants, the habitat of all surrounding wildlife is destroyed, damaging the dwarf ibis population along with the surrounding ecosystems. All of the efforts mentioned above to attempt to urbanize the island have come with their drawbacks, including the habitat destruction of the dwarf ibis. These anthropogenic factors have been in response to an influx of inhabitants on the island. When more people visit the island, more resources are required to sustain them, explaining the additional increase in logging and contributing to the limiting of the ibis's available habitat and breeding range.

Overall population increases in São Tomé and Príncipe. The increase in population has increased the demand for resources which has consequently limited the available habitat for the dwarf ibis. Population of São Tomé (in thousands) is shown on the y-axis and time is on the x-axis.

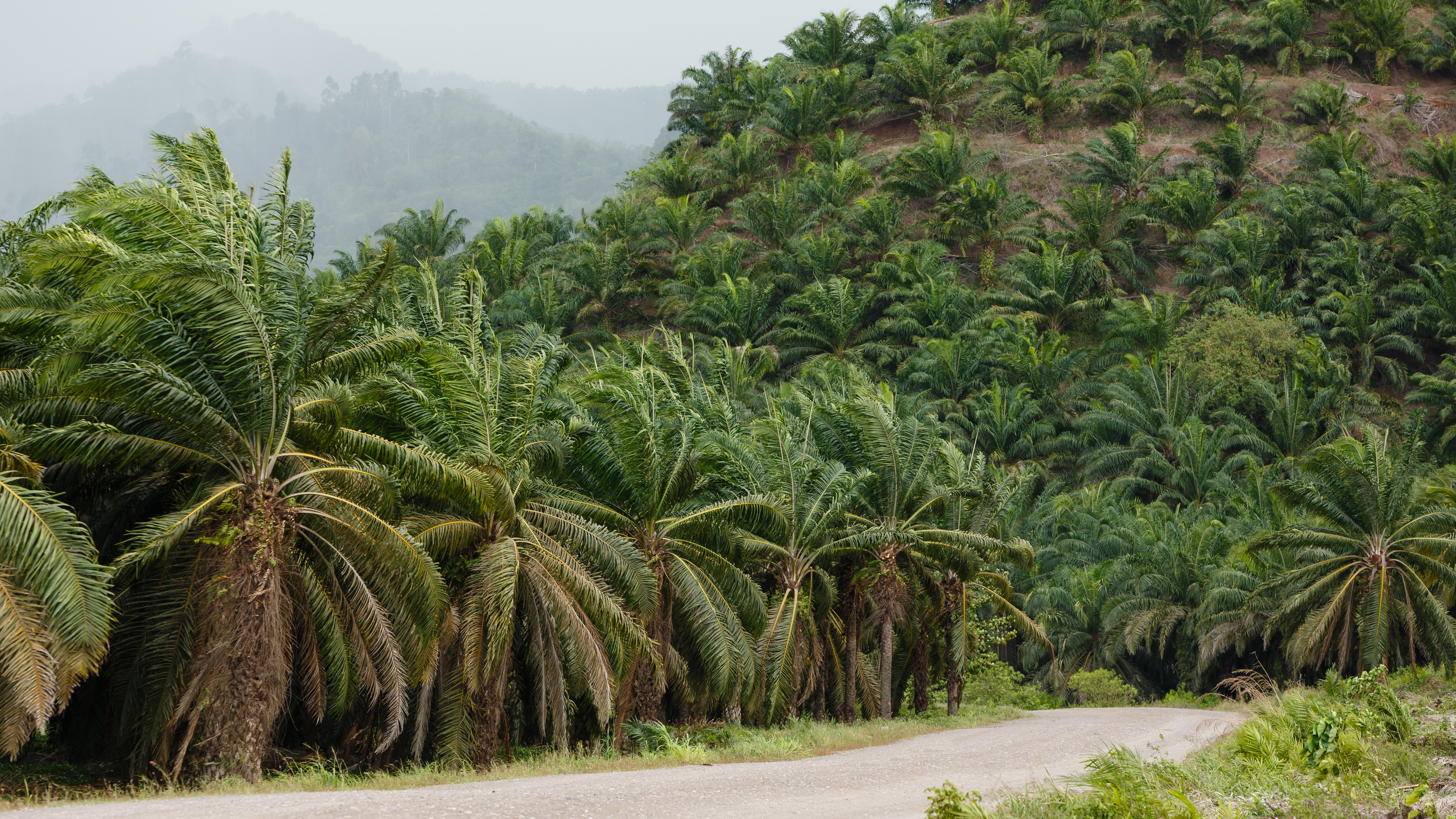
Oil palm plantation

Overhunting also plays perhaps the most important role in the endangered status of the dwarf ibis. As a large bird that forages on the forest floor and displays island tameness, it is very vulnerable to human hunters. Whether it is hunting for sport or accidental killings, the ibis population is decreasing in ways that are not attributable to simply the overexploitation of resources and the environment.

=== Environmental ===
Aside from anthropogenic threats, there are several environmental factors that threaten the population of the dwarf ibis in the form of invasive species, which dominate the food web of São Tomé and can compete with the ibis for resources or act as predators. Non-native predators include feral cats, feral dogs, Mona monkeys, black rats, least weasels and African civets.

== Conservation ==
=== Efforts ===
Biodiversity research in all of the Gulf of Guinea has been limited in the past due to political instability, economic collapse, and agricultural focuses. Conservation of the biodiversity of São Tomé has been discussed for over 100 years, but only acted upon in the last forty or so.

In 1993, the Gulf of Guinea Conservation Group was formed after a meeting of scientists in Britain concluded that further research and conservation was necessary. This group brought other scientists to the islands so that they could study the wildlife and make adequate conservation plans that could be enacted to save the wildlife. Simultaneously, the European Commission began to fund the ECOFAC program. The ECOFAC program was designed to fund various studies in São Tomé and Príncipe centered around biodiversity and conservation. Additionally, the program aimed at promoting sustainably using forest ecosystems to try to combat the overexploitation. The ECOFAC program has been successful in its funding of studies and its foundational basis for all other conservation efforts of São Tomé. Specifically, it led to the creation of the Bom Sucesso Botanical Garden, which is the gateway to the Obô National Park in São Tomé. Although not directly founded for the conservation of the dwarf ibis, its effects were indirect and have helped the population.

International organizations have also begun to get involved in conservation in São Tomé, which has trickle-down effects to helping the dwarf ibis. In 2018, BirdLife International opened an office in São Tomé to help promote conservation and research, which it was helping with since 2012. Since 2015, Fauna and Flora International has worked to build conservation capacity and raise awareness for the environment.

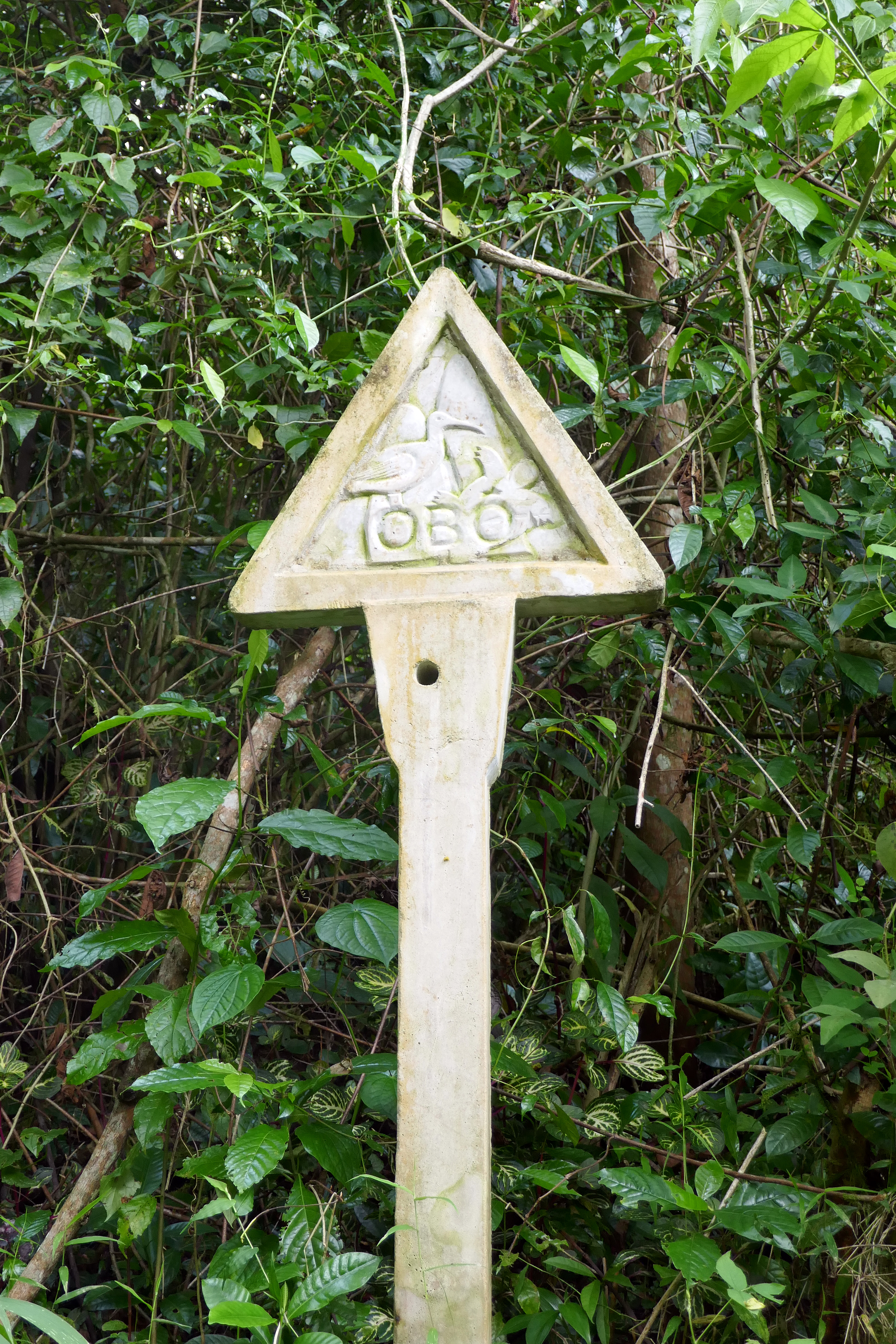
The entrance to Obô National Park in São Tomé.

The establishment of the Obô National Park in 2006 placed the best-preserved forests under protection for conservation. This includes the majority of the breeding range for the dwarf ibis. Currently, the majority of the dwarf ibis land is under protection, but it is being encroached upon by people illegally and is under threat by anthropogenic overexploitation. The São Tomé community uses lots of wood for building and amenities and relies on other extractive methods for their other resources. Because of this need, they have to illegally harvest resources in national parks, explaining how 5,000 tons of firewood was used in 2014. In order to help conserve the wildlife and the dwarf ibis, it is necessary that a living model that is based on nature conservation is established such that the locals understand that what they are doing is beneficial to them as well. This idea is being developed on the neighboring island of Príncipe, but it is still not present on the more populous island of São Tomé.

A 2011 case study conducted by The Mohamed bin Zayed Species Conservation Fund looked at the biodiversity of São Tomé, eventually awarding it $7,850 to help preserve land and conserve the species. This case study was one of the first of its kind due to the lack of data of the endemic species of the island. Specifically, the study highlighted how important it was to raise awareness both in and out of the country so that people would mobilize to help save the species. Although the award wasn't much, it helped to contribute to the awareness aspect of the conservation of the dwarf ibis.

In December, 2021, the European Union created the Global Gateway strategy to help develop sustainable infrastructure in developing countries that simultaneously integrates partnerships, democratic values, and private companies. This initiative is giving half of its €300 billion budget to Africa so that they can help with conservation efforts. Some of this money will be going towards the Gulf of Guinea and can be used to help conserve species like the dwarf ibis.

=== Challenges ===
While conservation efforts are becoming more prominent on São Tomé, no conservation plan has been enacted specifically to protect the dwarf ibis. Every conservation effort has been directed at species in general or conserving the flora of the ecosystem, not necessarily the avian fauna.

In order to combat the problems of over hunting, habitat loss, and tourism, it is advisable to work directly with the hunters and tourist companies to attempt to resolve the issue. By working with the people that hunt the birds as well as with the access tourists have to seeing the birds, the São Tomé ibis will have a higher likelihood of survival in the foreseeable future. Bringing awareness to the dwarf ibis is important, which comes with making people care about it and getting the word out.

While working with the problem seems like a smart choice to make, a fundamental attitude change needs to happen to shift the locals' focus away from extraction and towards conservation. A cultural shift is difficult to initiate, but it is necessary to kickstart the conservation of not just the dwarf ibis, but other species on the island.
