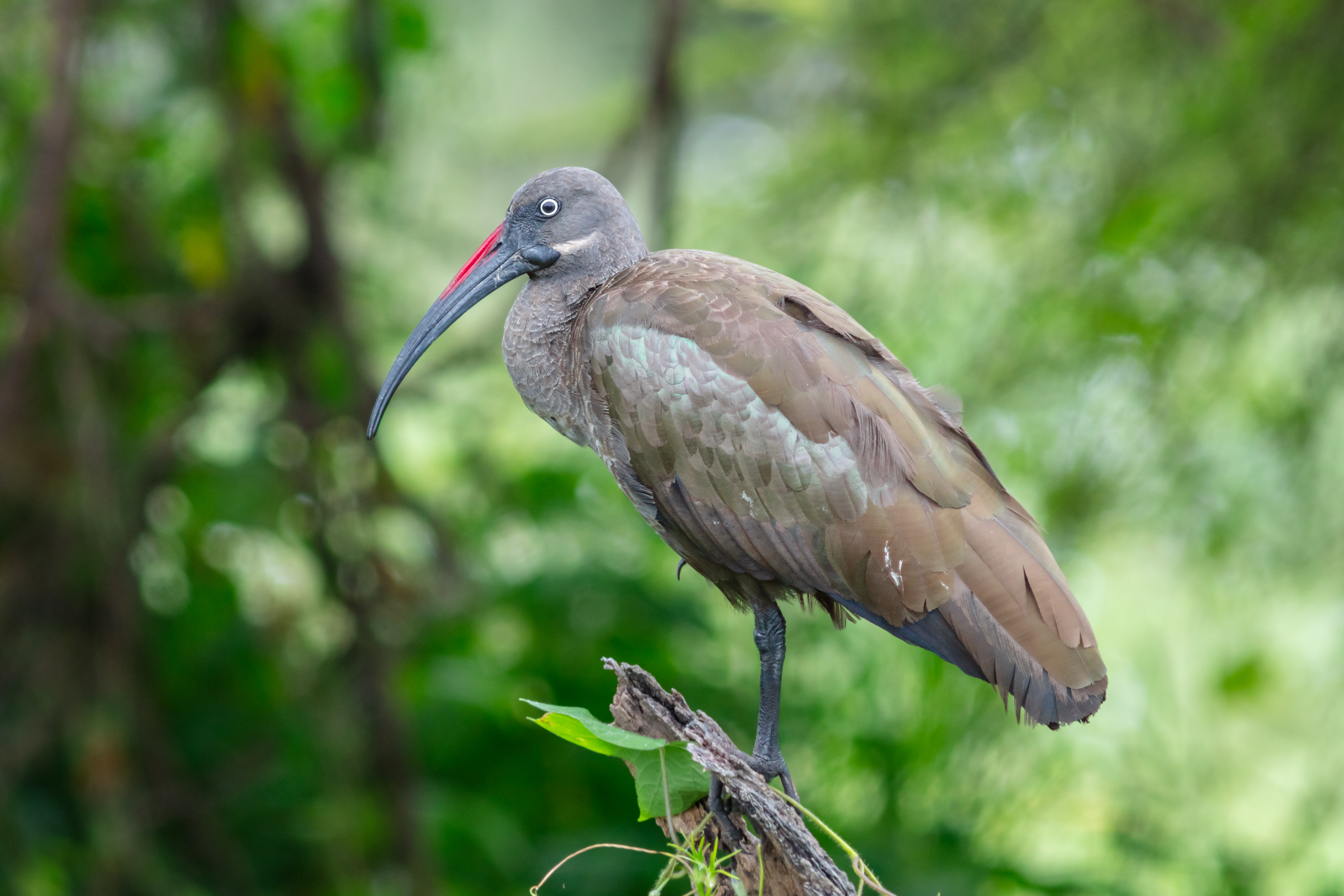
- In the National Park of Tarangire, Tanzania

Conservation status
- Least Concern (IUCN 3.1)

Scientific classification
- Kingdom: Animalia
- Phylum: Chordata
- Class: Aves
- Order: Pelecaniformes
- Family: Threskiornithidae
- Genus: Bostrychia
- Species: B. hagedash

Binomial name
- Bostrychia hagedash (Latham, 1790)
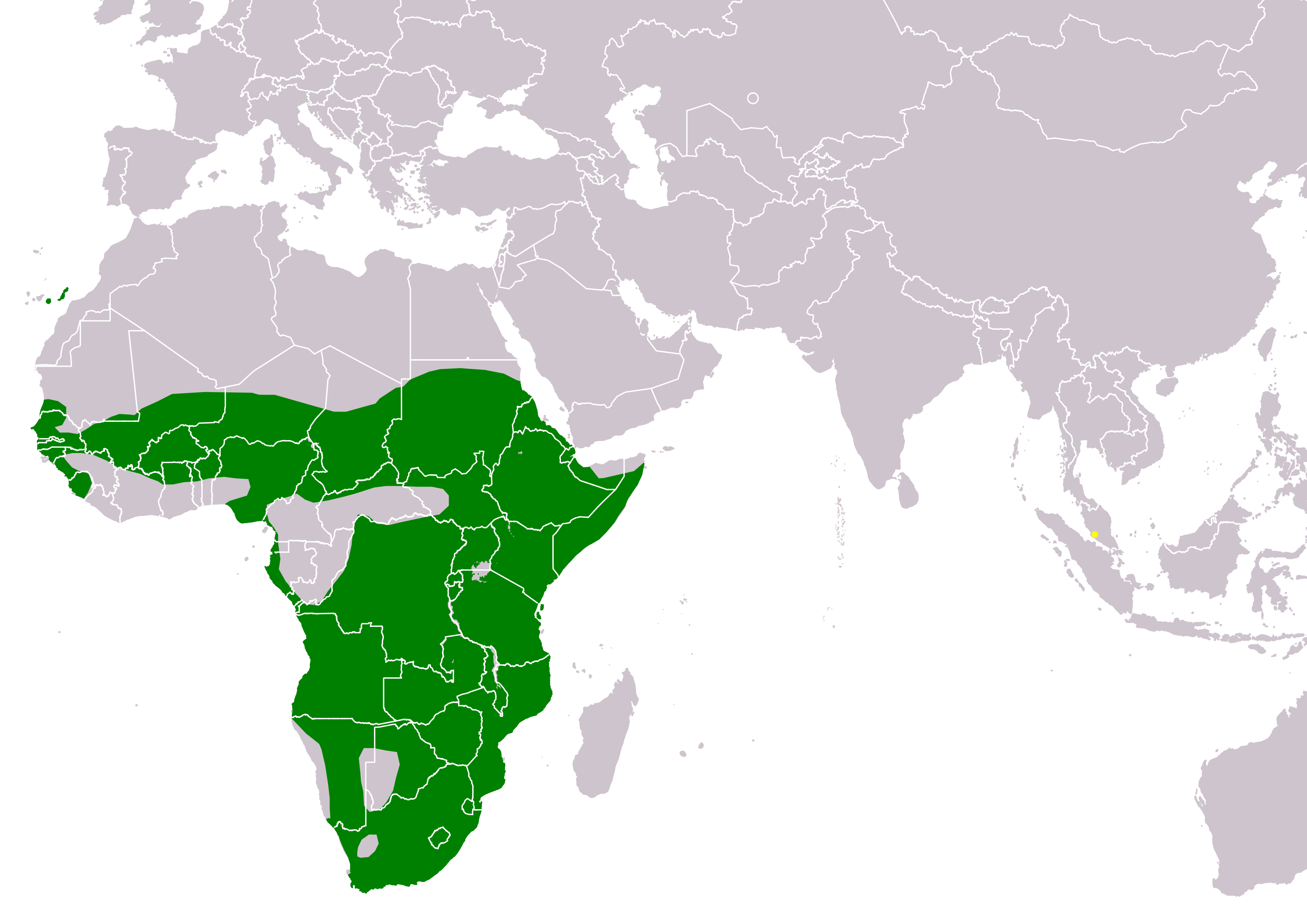
- range in 2024 native range (Sub-Saharan Africa) introduced (Malaysian Peninsula)

Synonyms
- Tantalus hagedash Latham, 1790; Geronticus hagedash (Latham, 1790); Ibis hagedasch Wagler, 1827; Tantalus cafrensis Lichtenstein, 1793; Ibis chalcoptera Vieillot, 1817

Audio
- Calls recorded near Kitale, Kenya

= Hadada ibis =

Species of bird

The hadada ibis (Bostrychia hagedash) or hadeda (/ˈhɑːdiːdɑː/) is an ibis native to Sub-Saharan Africa. It is named for its loud three to four note calls uttered in flight especially in the mornings and evenings when they fly out or return to their roost trees. Although not as dependent on water as some ibises, they are found near wetlands and often live in close proximity to humans, foraging in cultivated land and gardens. A medium-sized ibis with stout legs and a typical down-curved bill, the wing coverts are iridescent with a green or purple sheen. They are non-migratory but are known to make nomadic movements in response to rain particularly during droughts. Their ranges in southern Africa have increased with an increase in tree cover and irrigation in human-altered habitats.

== Taxonomy, systematics and etymology ==
Tantalus hagedash was the scientific name proposed by John Latham in 1790 who described it from a specimen that had been collected at "Houteniquas", due north of Mossel Bay, by Anders Sparrman who also recorded that it was onomatopoeically "called by the colonists hagedash, and also hadelde." It was later placed in a monotypic genus as Hagedashia hagedash but has since been placed in the genus Bostrychia. Three subspecies are recognized, the nominate form is found south of the Zambezi river and is paler and shorter billed than those of other subspecies. Populations to the north of the Zambezi river and towards the eastern parts of Africa including Uganda, Tanzania, Sudan and Ethiopia are larger and longer billed and designated as B. h. nilotica (Neumann, 1909) while to the west from Senegal to Congo and Kenya the darker brown and more brightly glossed populations are designated as B. h. brevirostris (Reichenow, 1907). A range of intermediate plumages are known and other subspecies such as erlangeri and guineensis have been proposed in the past.

The name hadeda with an e as opposed to the official IOC English name of hadada ibis, is used in some South African works including notable regional bird lists such as Roberts VII Names Database.

== Description ==
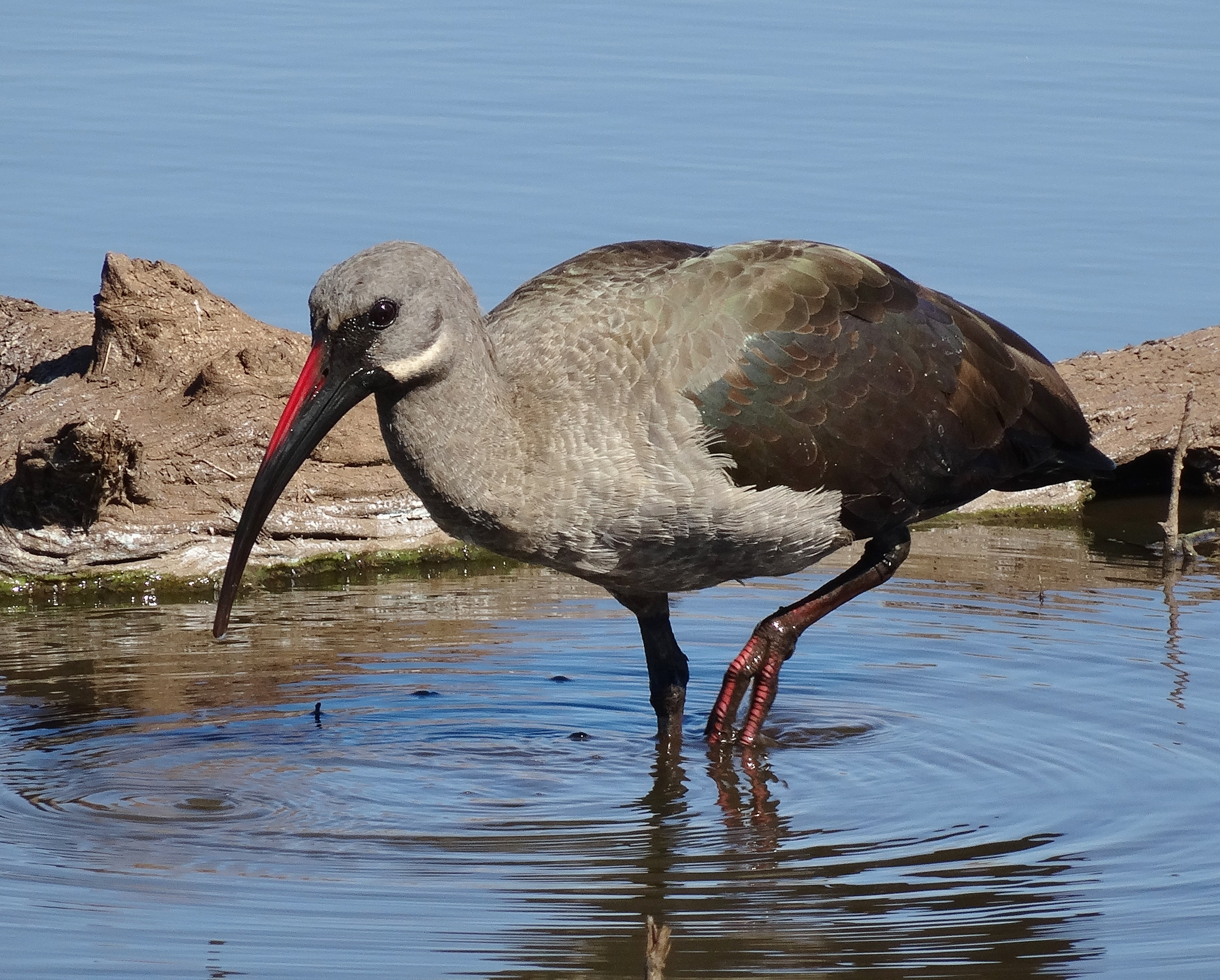
The nominate subspecies has a dark eye and paler grey head and neck than the northern subspecies. It also has pink (green from certain angles) wing covert plumage, and a less distinct white cheek stripe. Its wings and bill are also shorter.

The hadada is a large (about 76 cm (30 in) long), grey-to-partly brown species of ibis. Adults have a mean body mass of 1.2 kilograms (2.65 lbs.). Males and females are alike in plumage. It has a narrow, white, roughly horizontal stripe across its cheeks. This is sometimes called the "moustache" though it does not reach the mouth corners. The plumage over the wings has an iridescent purple sheen produced by optical microstructures within the feathers. The bird has blackish legs and a large grey-to-black bill but during the breeding season it has a red culmen on the basal half of the upper mandible. The upper surfaces of the toes are of a similar red during the onset of breeding. The wings are powerful and broad, enabling quick take-offs and easy manoeuvring through dense tree cover.

It has an extremely loud and distinctive "haa-haa-haa-de-dah" call—hence the onomatopoetic name. The call is often heard when the birds are flying or are startled, or when the birds communicate socially. While roosting they produce a single loud "haaaa". When foraging, their contact call is a low growl.

== Distribution and habitat ==
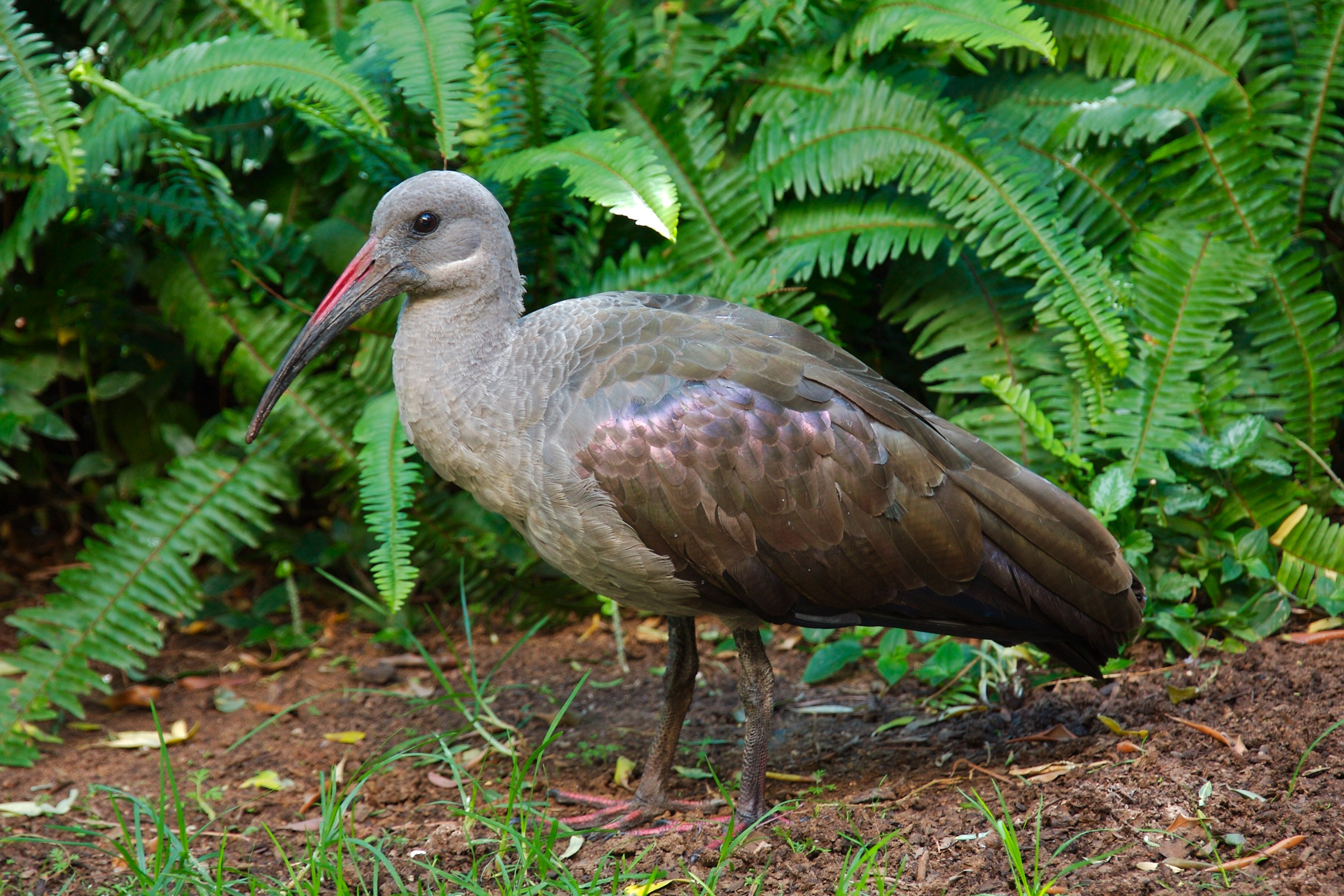
Nominate subspecies in breeding plumage in suburban Johannesburg

Calls of the nominate subspecies at dawn in suburban Pretoria, Gauteng

The hadada ibis occurs throughout Sub-Saharan Africa in open grasslands, savanna and wetlands, as well as urban parks, school fields, green corridors and large gardens. This bird occurs in Sudan, Burundi, Ethiopia, Senegal, Uganda, Tanzania, Gabon, Democratic Republic of Congo, Cameroon, Canary Islands, Gambia, Kenya, Somalia, Lesotho, Eswatini, Botswana, Mozambique, Zimbabwe, Namibia, and South Africa.

The distribution range of the hadada has increased in southern Africa by nearly two and a half times in the 20th century following the introduction of trees in parts that were treeless. Irrigation projects may have also helped in their expansion as they appear to need moist and soft soils in which to probe for food.

== Behaviour and ecology ==
Hadada ibises roost in groups on trees. They fly out in the mornings with loud calls and return in the evenings with regularity. Hadada feed on insects, millipedes and earthworms, using their long scimitar-like bill to probe soft soil. They also eat larger insects, such as the Parktown prawn, and also spiders and small lizards. These birds also feed readily on snails and often clear garden beds around residential homes. They are particularly welcomed on bowling and golf greens because they are assiduous in extracting larvae of moths and beetles that feed on the roots of the grass.

Like other ibis species, including spoonbills, and like some other probing feeders such as sanderling and kiwi, hadada have sensory pits around the tips of their bills. In their foraging for unseen prey, such as shallow subterranean larvae, the pits enable them to locate feeding insects and earthworms.

Hadada have become very common in many African cities and tolerate the closeness of humans. They are able to judge the direction of gaze of humans and the speed of approach to decide their escape strategies. Hadada ibises have been involved in several bird-hits at airports in Kenya and South Africa.

Hadada are monogamous and pair bonds are thought to persist throughout the year. Breeding begins after the rains. In the Cape province, they breed mainly from October to November. The nest is a platform of twigs placed in a major branch of a large tree, typically in a fork, and unlike most ibis species, in spite of their moderately gregarious nature, they do not nest in groups. Both parents take part in incubating the clutch of three to four eggs. Incubation takes about 26 days. The parents feed the young by regurgitating food. Many young birds die by falling off the nest. The survivors fledge in about 33 days.

== In culture ==
The calls of hadada ibises are considered as a sign of impending rains in parts of Lesotho. The Xhosa people use the name ing'ang'ane or ingagane which means black ibis as opposed to the white sacred ibis. The name in many African languages is onomatopoeic. It is known as Zililili in Chewa, Chinawa in Chiyao, Chihaha or Mwanawawa in Tumbuka, and Mwalala in Khonde. Colonial hunters considered it as a good bird for eating. The Bantu people of Uganda have an origin story where a man and wife starved themselves during a drought while letting their children eat whatever little they had. The man and his wife were then turned into ibises that go by the name of Mpabaana. In Zululand the name ingqangqamathumba indicates that anyone who mocks the bird will break out in abscesses. When they fly continually, they are said to foretell a rich harvest in that year. A saying utahthisele amathole eng'ang'ane which means "he has taken the hadada's nestlings" is an idiom used to indicate that someone has offended a vindictive man and that he would have to be careful.

Some bird depictions on bronze plaques and ceremonial staffs from Benin that were kept in German museums were examined by Ernst Schüz who found them confusingly similar to the hadada but also showing a wattle prominently as in the wattled ibis.

== Conservation status ==
As the hadada ibis is widespread and common throughout its large range, it has been evaluated as Least Concern on the IUCN Red List.

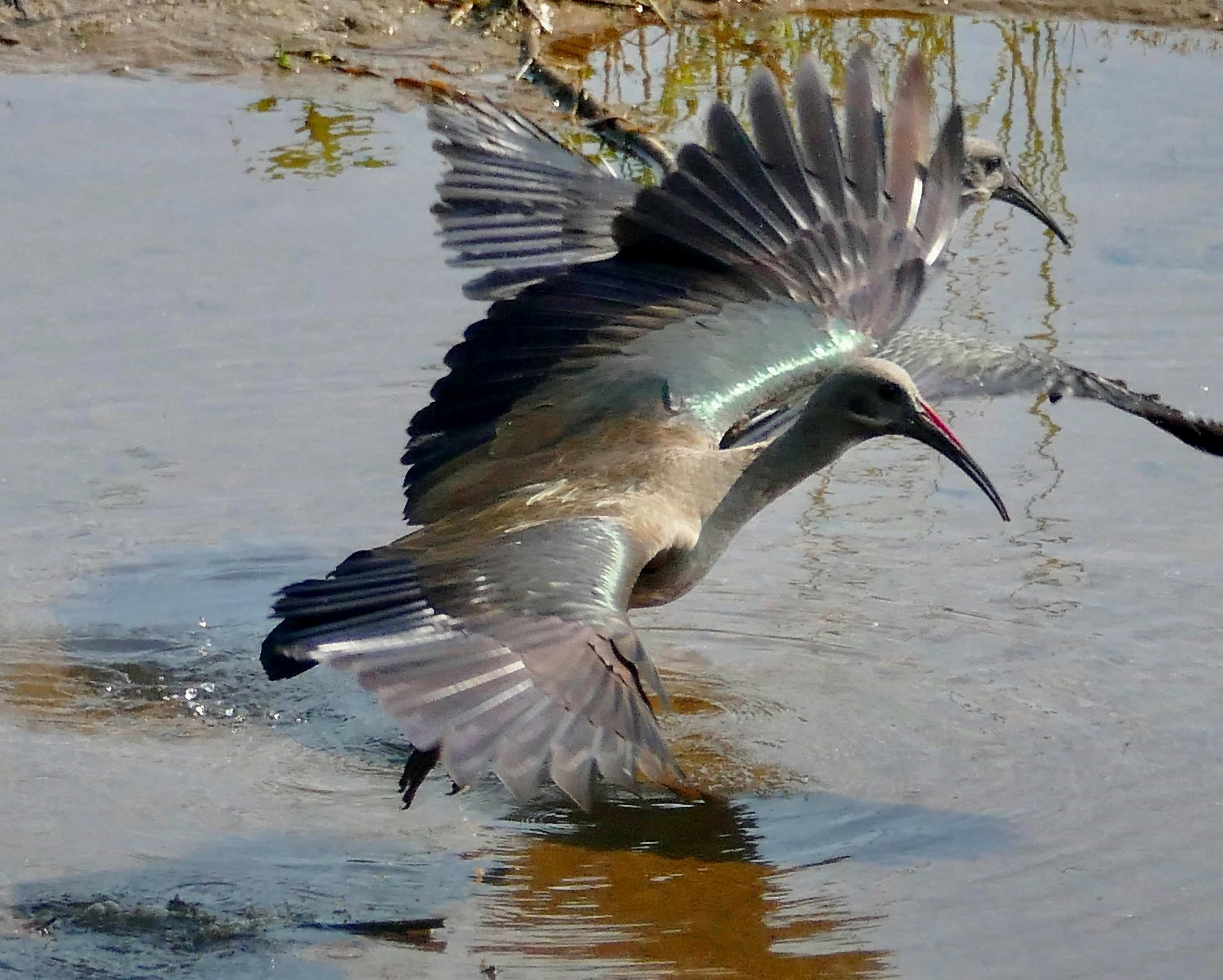
Taking flight from a river

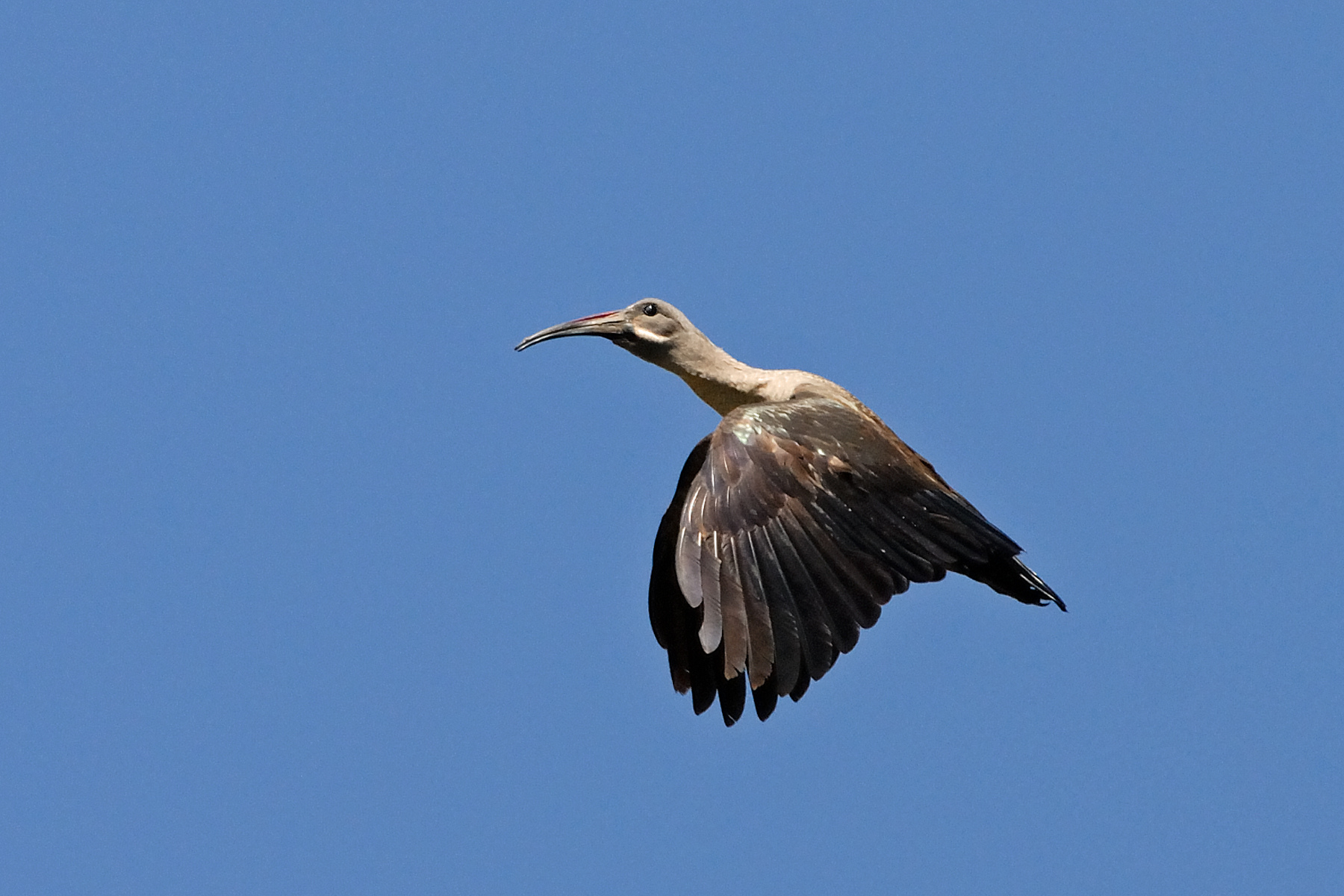
In flight in South Africa

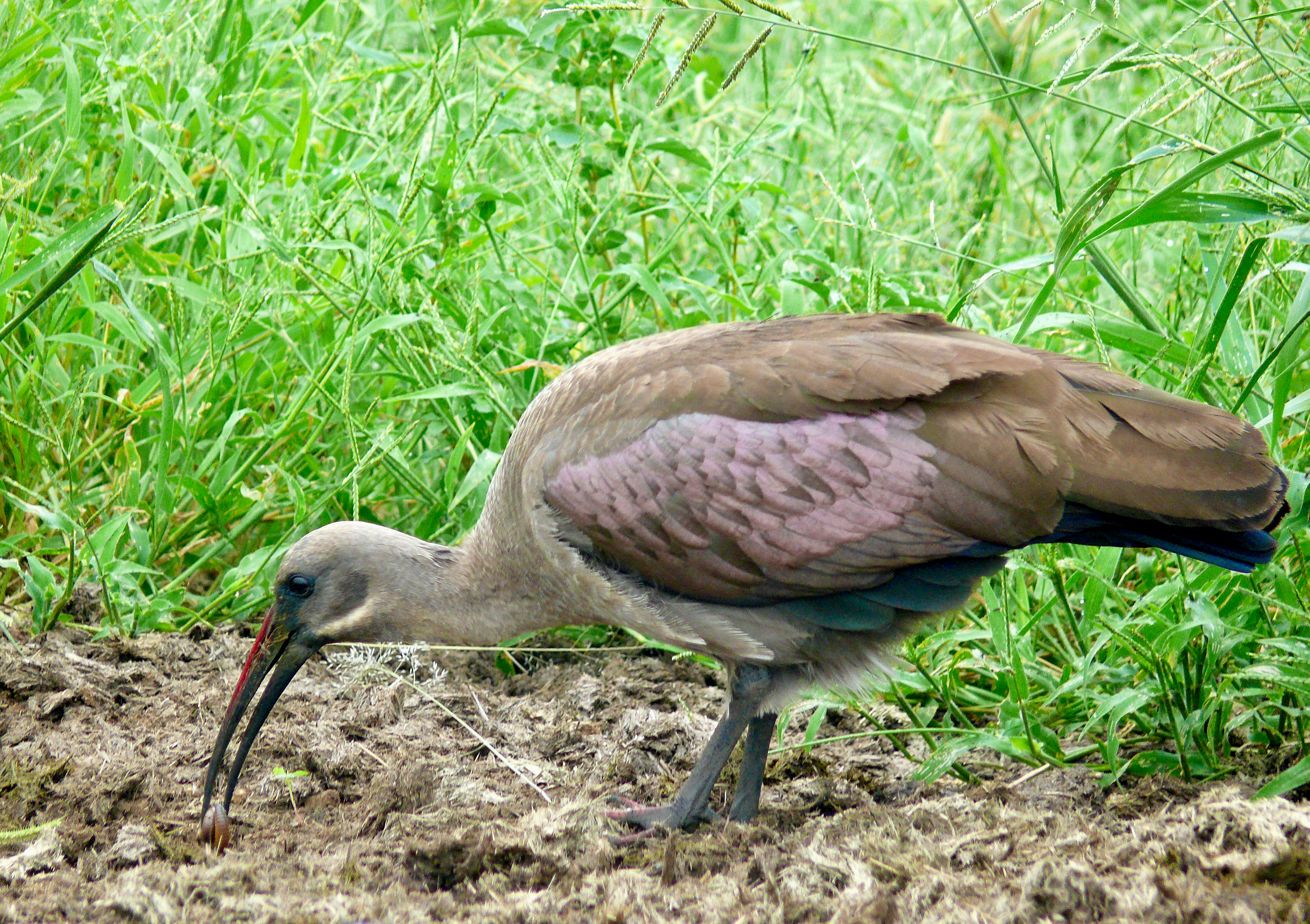
Foraging for invertebrate prey in rhino dung heap

Foraging on a beach in South Africa

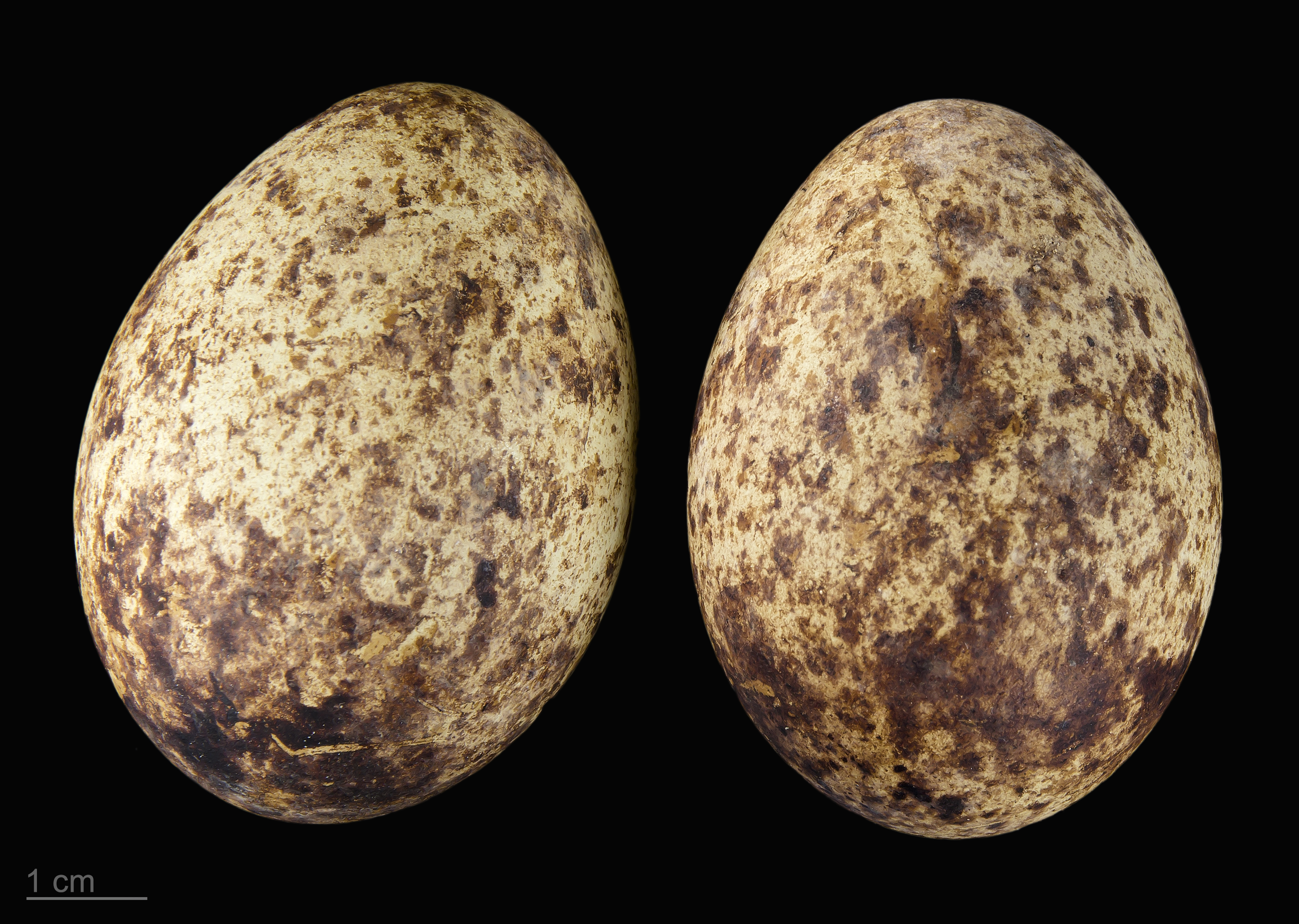
Eggs from same clutch in Guinée-Bissau
