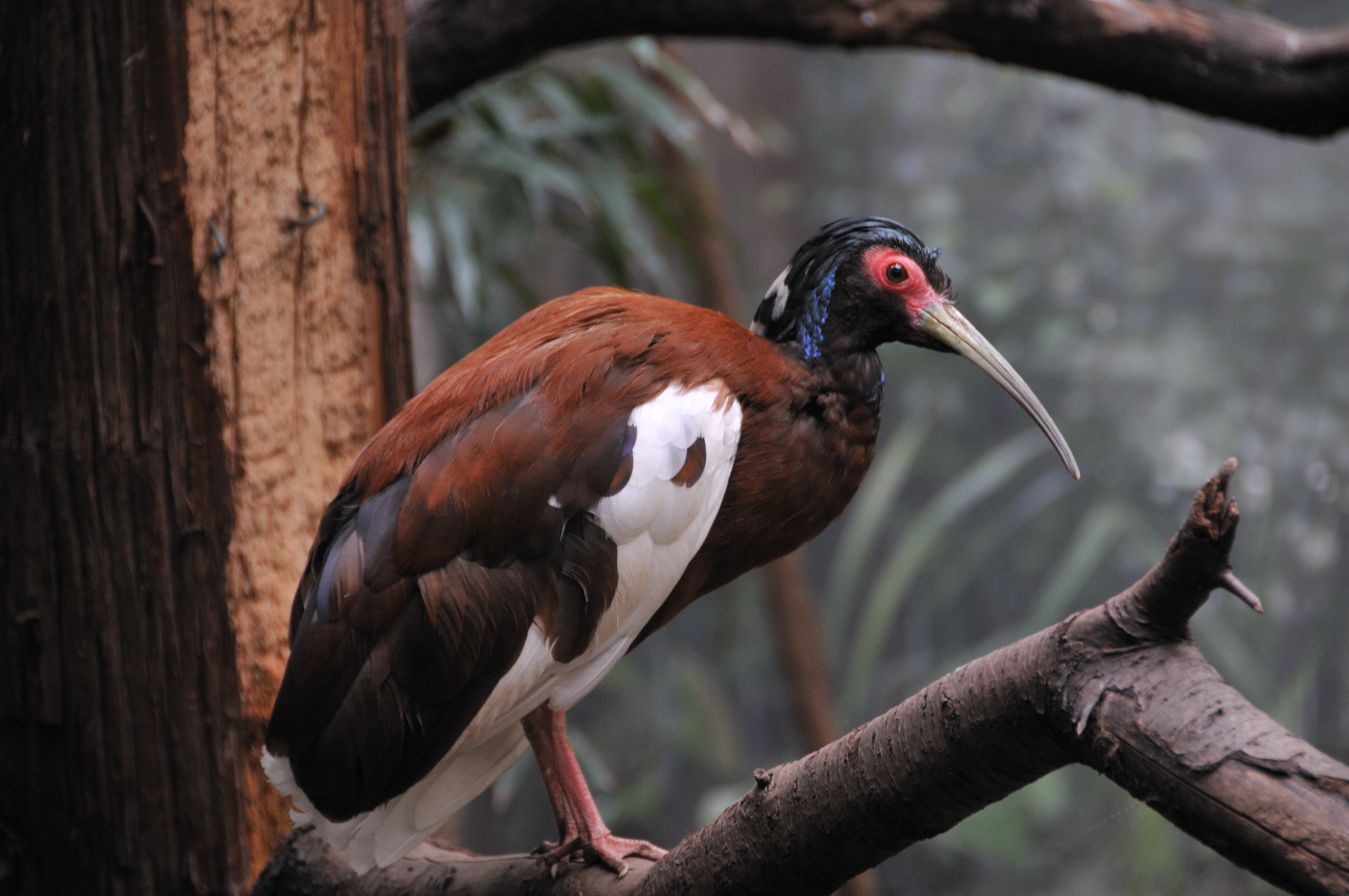
- At Bronx Zoo, New York, United States

Conservation status
- Vulnerable (IUCN 3.1)

Scientific classification
- Kingdom: Animalia
- Phylum: Chordata
- Class: Aves
- Order: Pelecaniformes
- Family: Threskiornithidae
- Genus: Lophotibis; Reichenbach, 1853
- Species: L. cristata

Binomial name
- Lophotibis cristata (Boddaert, 1783)

Synonyms
- Tantalus cristatus Boddaert, 1783; Geronticus cristatus (Boddaert, 1783)

= Madagascar ibis =

Species of bird

The Madagascar ibis (Lophotibis cristata), also known as the Madagascar crested ibis, white-winged ibis or crested wood ibis, is a medium-sized (approximately 50 cm long), brown-plumaged ibis. It has bare red orbital skin, yellow bill, red legs, white wings and its head is partially bare with a dense crest of green or gloss blue and white plumes on the nape. The Madagascar ibis is the only member of the genus Lophotibis.

== Taxonomy ==
The Madagascar ibis was described by the French polymath Georges-Louis Leclerc, Comte de Buffon in 1781 in his Histoire Naturelle des Oiseaux from a specimen collected on the island of Madagascar. The bird was also illustrated in a hand-coloured plate engraved by François-Nicolas Martinet in the Planches Enluminées D'Histoire Naturelle which was produced under the supervision of Edme-Louis Daubenton to accompany Buffon's text. Neither the plate caption nor Buffon's description included a scientific name but in 1783 the Dutch naturalist Pieter Boddaert coined the binomial name Tantalus cristatus in his catalogue of the Planches Enluminées. The Madagascar ibis is now the only species placed in the genus Lophotibis that was erected by the German naturalist Ludwig Reichenbach in 1853. The name of the genus combines the Ancient Greek lophos meaning "crest" and ibis; the specific epithet cristata is from the Latin crustatus meaning "crest".

== Description ==
The Madagascar ibis, with a length of 50 cm (20 in), is among the largest birds in the Madagascar forest. The head is black and the upper parts are rufous brown. The chin, neck and throat and underparts are dark brown and the wing is largely white. Part of the face is naked and red, including round the eye, and the crown and back of the neck bear a crest of long feathers which are black with a metallic sheen. In the subspecies L. c. cristata, the sheen is green and there are flecks of white; in the subspecies L. c. urschi, the throat, neck and crest have a greenish sheen mixed with yellowish-orange, and the body colour is darker chestnut. The iris is brown, the very long beak is horn-coloured and the legs and feet are red.

== Distribution and habitat ==
The Madagascar ibis is endemic to the woodlands and forests of Madagascar at altitudes of up to 2,000 m (6,600 ft). It is found in both primary and secondary forest, including humid forest in the northeast of the island and dry forests in the west and south.

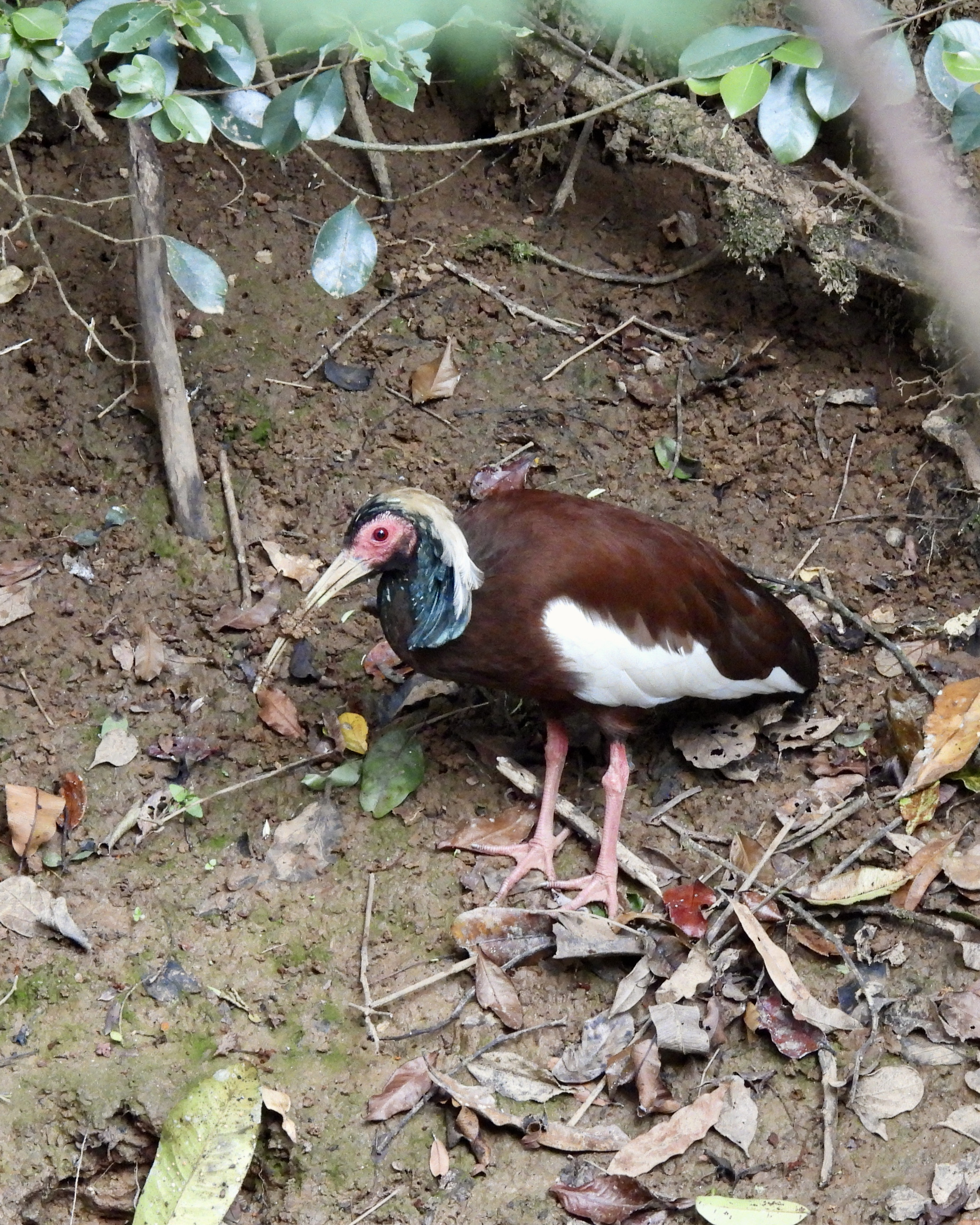
Wild Madagascar ibis in Andasibe National Park - the bill is muddy from probing the wet soil

== Ecology ==
Its diet consists mainly of insects, spiders, frogs, reptiles, snails and invertebrates. The female usually lays three eggs in a platform nest made from twigs and branches.

== Status ==
The total population of this ibis is thought to be declining due to ongoing habitat loss, and overhunting in some areas, it being a favourite quarry. The bird is evaluated as being a vulnerable species on the IUCN Red List of Threatened Species.
