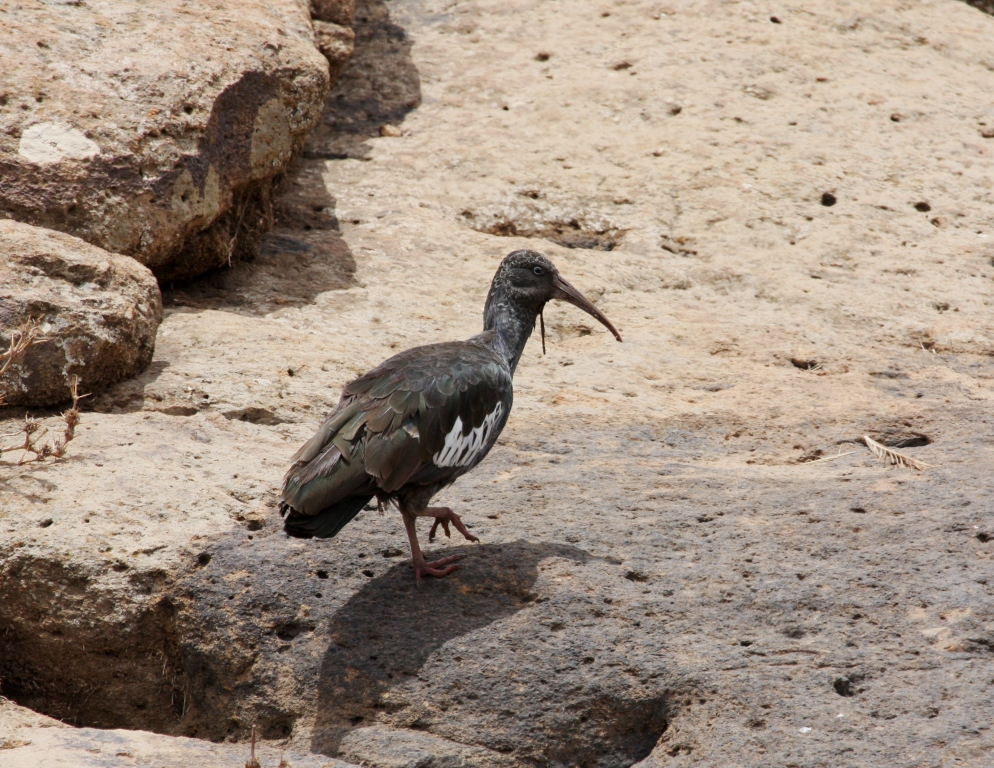
- In Ethiopia

Conservation status
- Least Concern (IUCN 3.1)

Scientific classification
- Kingdom: Animalia
- Phylum: Chordata
- Class: Aves
- Order: Pelecaniformes
- Family: Threskiornithidae
- Genus: Bostrychia
- Species: B. carunculata

Binomial name
- Bostrychia carunculata (Rüppell, 1837)

Synonyms
- Ibis carunculata Rüppell, 1837; Geronticus carunculatus (Rüppell, 1837)

= Wattled ibis =

Species of bird

The wattled ibis (Bostrychia carunculata) is a species of bird in the family Threskiornithidae. It is endemic to the Ethiopian Highlands and is found only in Ethiopia and Eritrea.

== Description ==
The Wattled ibis is a medium-sized, dark brown, crested bird, distinguished by the combination of its dark color, its creast and its extensive white wing-patch. It has a relatively short bill, a fairly long tail and a thin wattle hanging from its throat. The basic color of the adult is dark brown. The brown face is feathered with a dusky red bill. The eye is red and surrounded by a white ring. Plumage is glossed dull green; the waddle is small and red, about 20 mm long. Body length is about 65–75 cm.

== Range and habitat ==
They may occur all over Ethiopian highlands at altitudes ranging from 1500 m to the highest moorlands at 4100 m. It has also been recorded on the coast of Eritrea. It prefers meadows and highland river courses. It is often found in rocky places and cliffs (where it roosts and breeds), but also in open country, cultivated land, city parks and olive tree (Olea africana) and juniper (Juniperus procera) mixed forests. It has also become well adapted to anthropic landscapes and conditions; it can be seen in green areas and lawns of for example down-town Addis Ababa, year round. The wattled ibis is common to abundant.

== General habits ==
The wattled ibis is a gregarious species, often flocking in groups of 30 to 100, but it also can be seen feeding alone or in pairs. It forages in open grasslands, marshes, open alpine moorlands, croplands and forest glades. When feeding it walks about methodologically, probing the ground regularly. It feeds on worms, insect larvae, and small invertebrates; occasionally frogs, snakes and mice. Sometimes it is seen with herds of domestic animals, searching dung for beetles. It roosts singly or in pairs in trees, in groups on rock cliffs, often at sites of breeding colonies. The wattled ibis is predominantly sedentary, undertaking only local, altitudinal movements.

== Breeding habits ==
The wattled ibis usually nests in small to large colonies on rocky cliffs, over bushes hanging in the walls, but it has also been reported to nest singly on top of trees or ledges of buildings. Few colonies are known above 3000 meters, and those in trees at lower elevations (1800 – 2000 m) in Lake Awasa. In the Bale Mountains there are nesting colonies of 500 or more birds. The nest is a platform of branches and sticks, lined with grass and strips of bark; sometimes at high and cold altitudes, they are located to the east for maximum exposure to morning sun. The wattled ibis breeds from March to July; and occasionally in December, during the dry season. It lays two or three rough shelled eggs which are dirty white in color.

== Threats ==
No reduction in numbers nor any obvious threat have been reported and the species is often seen within bigger cities like Addis Ababa, not much disturbed by human activity. Therefore, it is not considered to be of conservation concern, since the population is rather large.
