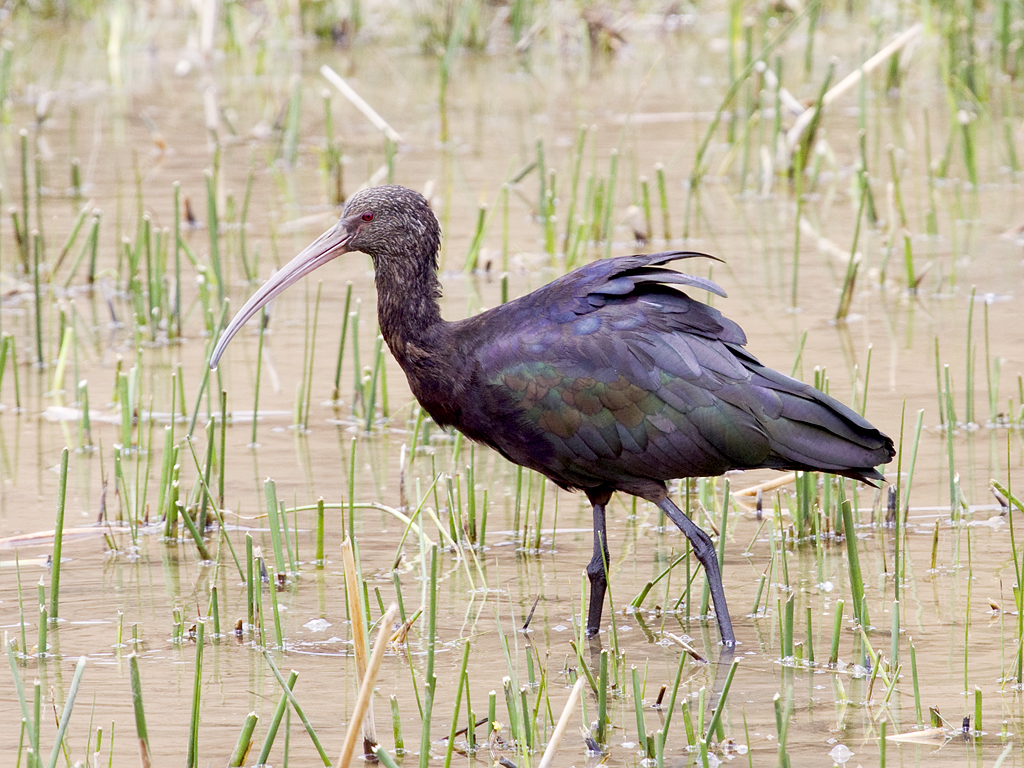
- Near Cusco, Peru

Conservation status
- Least Concern (IUCN 3.1)

Scientific classification
- Kingdom: Animalia
- Phylum: Chordata
- Class: Aves
- Order: Pelecaniformes
- Family: Threskiornithidae
- Genus: Plegadis
- Species: P. ridgwayi

Binomial name
- Plegadis ridgwayi (Allen, 1876)

Synonyms
- Falcinelus ridgwayi Allen, 1876

= Puna ibis =

Species of bird

The puna ibis (Plegadis ridgwayi) is a species of waterbird in the family Threskiornithidae, spoonbills and ibises. It can be found in Ecuador, Argentina, Bolivia, Chile, and Peru. It can be found in the altiplano and puna regions of the Andean highlands, inhabiting wetlands such as swamps, marshes and lakes, at an elevation of 3,000 to 4,500 metres (9,840 to 14,760 ft). They migrate down to sea level to forage in coastal wetlands as well.

== Description ==
The puna ibis is a medium-sized waterbird, weighing 478–608 g (16.9–21.4 oz) and about 56–61 cm (22–24 in) tall. They can be identified by their dark purple-brown bodies, long neck, and red downward-curved bill. Their plumage has iridescence to it, offering a purple or green sheen. While there is little sexual dimorphism between male and females, a breeding adult can be recognized by its dark chestnut head and neck, with a red face and, and nonbreeding or immature individuals have white streaks on their head and neck, with a duller face. Males are also larger than females.

This species lives in wetlands such as marshes, lagoons, and shallow lakes across the high Andes. This species mainly feeds on invertebrates, but may also snack on amphibians and small fish when possible. It captures its prey by probing through the water or mud with its long beak.

They breeds in mixed colonies with other water birds. Nests are built within tall vegetation, hidden from predators. The species is listed as least concern on the IUCN Red List. However, exact population numbers are unknown, and they may be facing threats such as habitat degradation.

== Taxonomy ==
Puna ibis are in the genus Plegadis, part of the family Threskiornithidae. Threskiornithidae includes 13 genera and 32 species of spoonbills and ibises. In Peru, there are nine species within Threskiornithidae, the most represented being the puna ibis. According to the South American Classification Committee (SACC), the genus Plegadis contains three species – Plegadis ridgwayi, Plegadis chihi and Plegadis falcinellus. The genus belongs to a monophyletic clade, that also includes Platalea and Threskiornis. The sister species of Plegadis ridgwayi is Plegadis chihi, while Plegadis falcinellus is a sister to the clade. There is evidence to suggest the possible hybridization between P. ridgwayi and P. chihi, although it is unknown whether it is historical or due to recent contact. Additionally there is strong evidence of hybridization between P. falcinellus and P. chihi.

== Habitat and distribution ==
Puna ibis are found in Ecuador, Peru, Bolivia, Northern Chile, and Northeastern Argentina. The core population resides in Peru and Bolivia. Puna ibis is a characteristic species of the high Andean region. They occur from sea level to 5,000 metres (16,400 ft) in elevation, however the greatest concentration in the high Andes are between 3,000 and 4,500 metres (9,840 and 14,760 ft) as well as a significant amount between sea level and 500 m (1,640 ft) along the coast. They occupy both altitudinal and coastal wetlands such as swamps, marshes, lagoons, river banks, and flooded grasslands. They've also been sighted in artificial habitats like irrigation canals, flooded agricultural lands, and plants of abandoned waste water treatment facilities.

Recently, there has been a range expansion of the puna ibis, with populations moving northward, and towards the coast. This range expansion could be attributed to the habitat degradation in the high Andes.

The data on population size of the puna ibis is poor. The population in the Lake Junín area of Peru was previously estimated at 8,000 by Hancock et al., meaning the total population would be around 10,000. This estimate is thought to be lower with population decline. Another estimate placed the population at 10,000–15,000. These estimates are highly uncertain. IUCN Redlist has the population size listed at 5,000–20,000.

== Behaviour ==
The puna ibis is a highly social bird. They form flocks of hundreds of individuals and exhibit cooperation behaviour such as shared nesting sites and protecting each other young. They are dinural, spending most of their time foraging in shallow waters, using their bill to probe around for food. When feeding they often sport a curved back, with some feathers raised, and flutter around in small groups a few meters above the ground. Ibis within the plegadis genus are also known to participate in sunbathing or sunning. A comfort behaviour in which the bird deliberately positions itself in the sun and adopts a unique posture. This behaviour is often preceded or followed by preening.

=== Vocalizations ===
Usually quite quiet, when disturbed puna ibis vocalize with a call that sounds like a "wut" or "cwurk". Juveniles are known to give a whispering call. The glossy ibis, plegadis falcinellus, vocalize when greeting their mates during nest relief, as well as when chicks are food-begging. Since both birds are in the same genus, it can be assumed that the puna ibis also vocalizes for those reasons as well.

=== Diet ===
Puna ibis use their long bill to probe into the water of mud often on the edges of denser vegetation to feed. Their diet includes invertebrates, however they may also consume amphibians and small fish if the opportunity presents itself.

=== Reproduction ===
As social birds, puna ibis are colonial nesters, meaning they nest in large groups in the same area. They build their nests in tall vegetation within the wetlands, and lay two eggs per clutch. The breeding season aligns with the wet season, providing maximum resource availability for the colony. Both parents incubate the eggs, which take about 21–28 days to hatch. The chicks are quite independent after hatching, however remain under their parents protection and learning to forage until they can go off on their own. They may nest in mixed colonies with other waterbirds. Very little is known about the species courtship behaviour.

=== Migration ===
This species does migrate, but rather than long-distance migration, they migrate altitudinally. Spending most of the year in the wetlands of the high Andes, they migrate down to coastal wetlands on the onset of the winter months, May to September. Recently, the severity of droughts in the high Andes has forced more birds to move to coastal areas, with coastal populations showing a gradual stabilization, and those in the high Andes declining over the past three decades.

== Threats ==
The main threat the puna ibis faces is habitat degradation. Irrigation and cultivation creates artificial feeding grounds, however it destroys suitable nesting areas Overgrazing, peat extraction, mining, and the construction of roads and reservoirs also degrades their habitat

Climate change may also pose a threat to the puna ibis as it increases the frequency of droughts, and modifies the hydrological conditions of the high Andes. This is evidence for the increased coastal population and decline in high Andes population, as well as the range expansion.

Additionally, the eggs from this species have been known to be overharvested by locals. The severity of this is unknown but it would definitely effect population size when combined with the other threats.

== Gallery ==
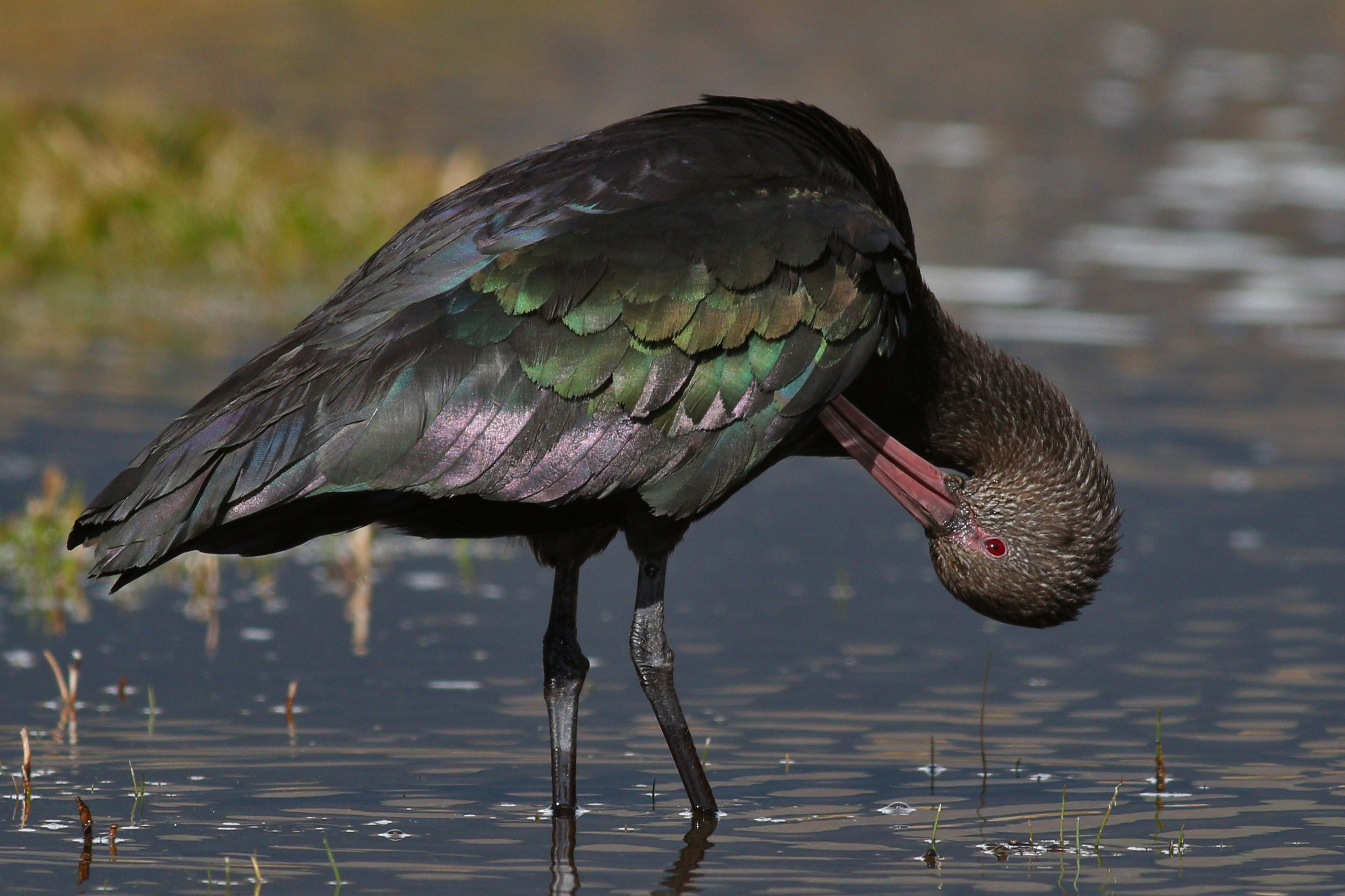
Peru

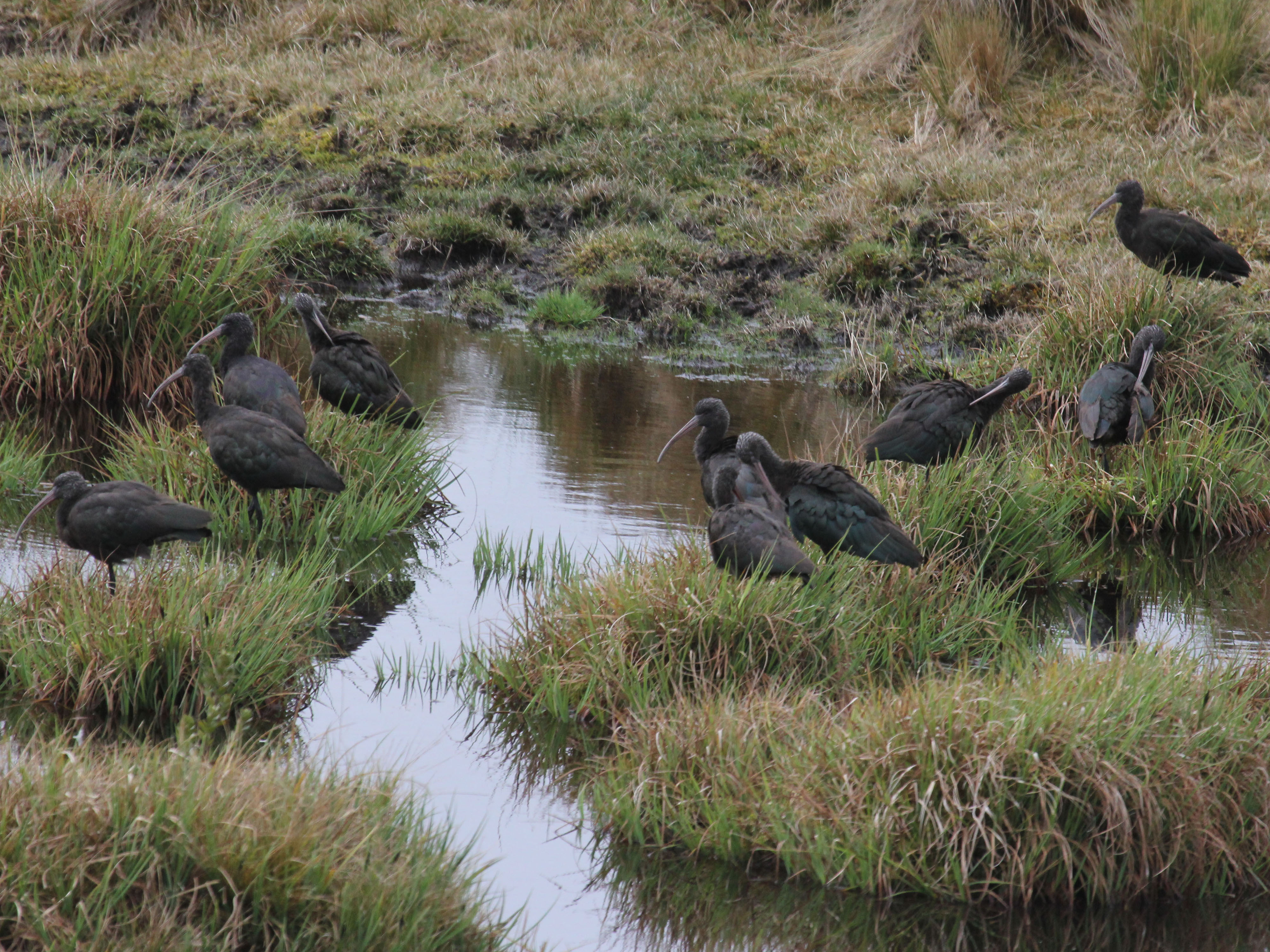
Andes of Peru

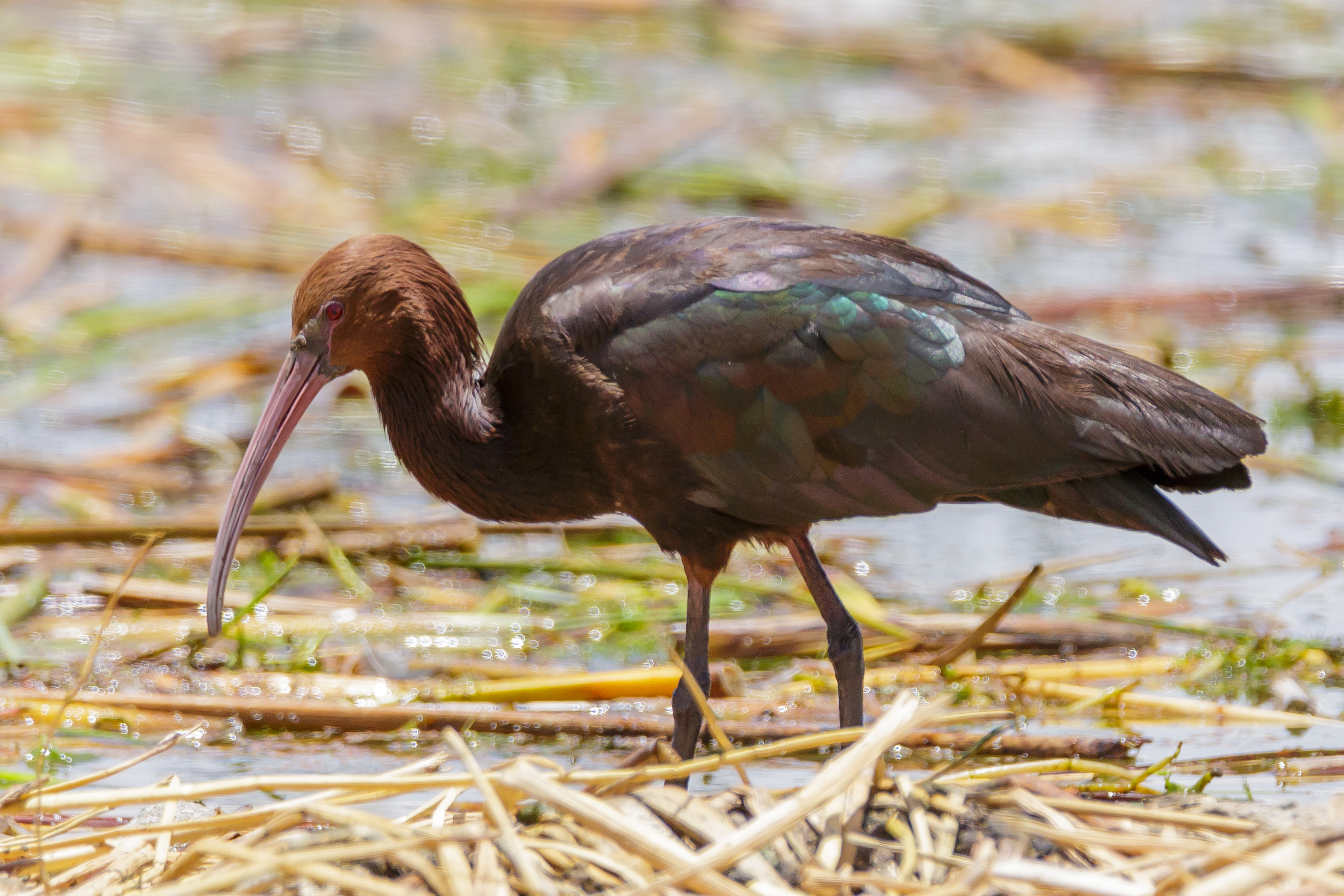
Puna ibis at Lake Titicaca
