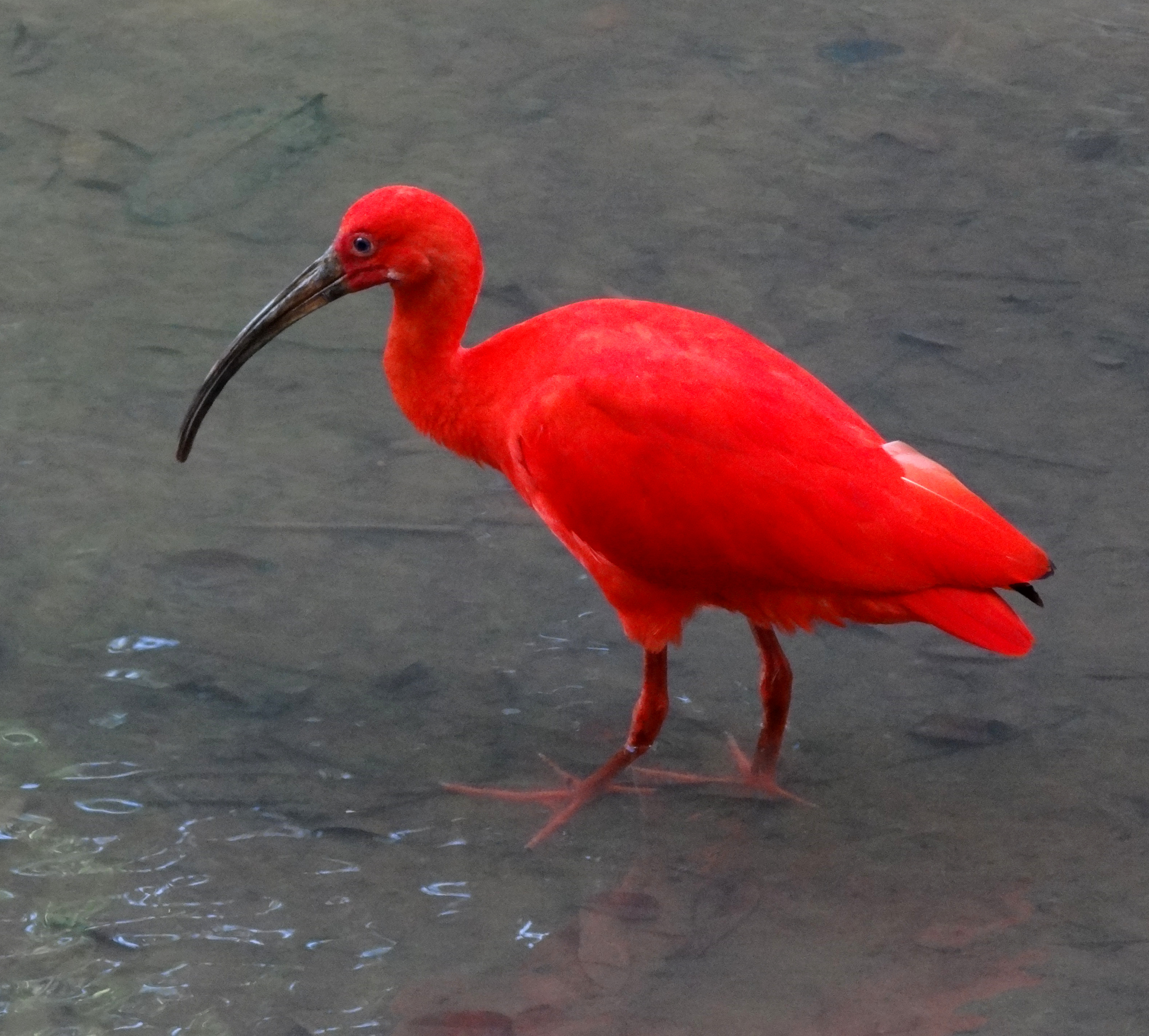
- Scarlet ibis

Scientific classification
- Kingdom: Animalia
- Phylum: Chordata
- Class: Aves
- Order: Pelecaniformes
- Family: Threskiornithidae
- Subfamily: Threskiornithinae
- Genus: Eudocimus; Wagler, 1832

Type species
- Scolopax rubra Linnaeus, 1758

Species
- E. albus E. ruber
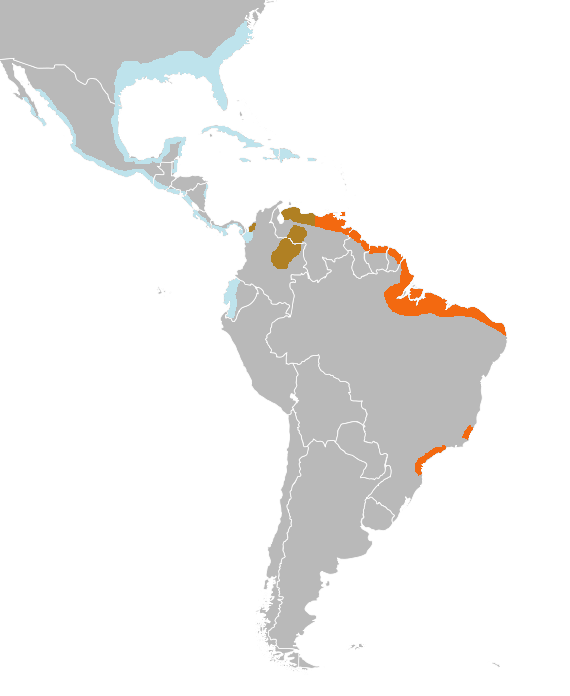
- Range of American white ibis (pale blue), scarlet ibis (orange), both (brown)

= Eudocimus =

Genus of birds

Eudocimus is a genus of ibises, wading birds of the family Threskiornithidae. They occur in the warmer parts of the New World with representatives from the southern United States south through Central America, the West Indies, and South America.

== Taxonomy and systematics ==
The genus Eudocimus appears to be most closely related to (but more primitive than) Plegadis, the latter distinguished anatomically by the conformation of the tarsometatarsus. The fossil record is poor, but the Early Miocene fossil species Plegadis paganus has some intermediate features. It has two foramina in the intertrochlear groove of its distal tarsometatarsus, as do Plegadis in contrast to the single foramen of Eudocimus and many other bird species. The derived nature of this species indicates ibises belonging to Eudocimus were already in existence at this time.

A 2010 study of mitochondrial DNA of the spoonbills by Chesser and colleagues, which included E. ruber, Nipponia nippon and Threskiornis aethiopicus found that E. ruber was an early offshoot and not closely related to a clade containing the spoonbills and Old World ibises.

Remains similar to E. albus have been found in Middle Pliocene deposits of the Bone Valley formation in central Florida, and Lower Pliocene deposits of the Yorktown Formation at Lee Creek in North Carolina. Two species, one living and one extinct, have been recovered from the Talara Tar Seeps in northern coastal Peru. Eudocimus peruvianus was described from a tarsometatarsus that differed slightly from E. albus, whose remains were also found there. Remains of neither species are common in the beds. The tar seeps have been dated at 13,900 years old. The American white ibis is still found in Peru.

=== Species ===
There are just two extant species in this genus,

Genus Eudocimus – Wagler, 1832 – two species
Common name	Scientific name and subspecies	Range	Size and ecology	IUCN status and estimated population
American white ibis	Eudocimus albus (Linnaeus, 1758)	Atlantic coast, from the Carolinas south to Florida and thence west along the Gulf Coast, through the Caribbean to northern South America, and along the Pacific coast from Mexico to Peru	Size: Habitat: Diet:	LC
Scarlet ibis	Eudocimus ruber (Linnaeus, 1758)	Atlantic coast of South America from southeast Brazil to Colombia, as well as inland in the Orinoco basin, and the islands of the Netherlands Antilles, and Trinidad and Tobago	Size: Habitat: Diet:	LC

The two species hybridize, and are sometimes considered conspecific.

== Description ==
These birds are found in marshy wetlands, often near coasts. They build stick nests in trees or bushes over water, and a typical clutch is two to five eggs. Eudocimus ibises are monogamous and colonial, often nesting in mixed colonies with other wading species.

Adults are 56–61 cm long with an 85–95 cm wingspan. They have long curved bills, pink legs and bare red faces. The plumage is all-white (albus) or all-scarlet (ruber), except for the black wing-tips, which are easily visible in flight. Juveniles are largely brown with white underparts and duller bare parts.

Eudocimus ibises feed by probing with their long, downcurved beaks. Their diet consists of fish, frogs, crustaceans and insects. They fly with neck and legs outstretched, often in long, loose lines, especially on their way to or from the night-time roosts.
