= Gerandibis =

Gerandibis pagana

Conservation status
- Extinct

Scientific classification
- Kingdom: Animalia
- Phylum: Chordata
- Class: Aves
- Order: Pelecaniformes
- Family: Threskiornithidae
- Genus: †Gerandibis; De Pietri, 2013
- Species: †G. pagana

Binomial name
- †Gerandibis pagana (Milne-Edwards, 1868)

Synonyms
- Ibis pagana Eudocimus paganus Plegadis paganus

Extinct genus of birds

Gerandibis is an extinct genus of ibis known from fossil remains from early Miocene (Aquitanian) beds in France. It contains a single species, Gerandibis pagana, which was originally described by Milne-Edwards in 1868 as Ibis pagana. Richard Sharpe classified it in the genus Eudocimus, but Storrs L. Olson placed it in the genus Plegadis due to anatomical similarities closer to that genus. The ibises of the genus Plegadis have two natural foramina (holes) in the intertrochlear groove in the distal section of the tarsometatarsus, where as ibises of Eudocimus (and many other species of bird) have one small foramen. P. paganus has two small holes akin to living species of Plegadis. The species was eventually made the type species of a separate genus Gerandibis by Vanesa L. De Pietri (2013).
