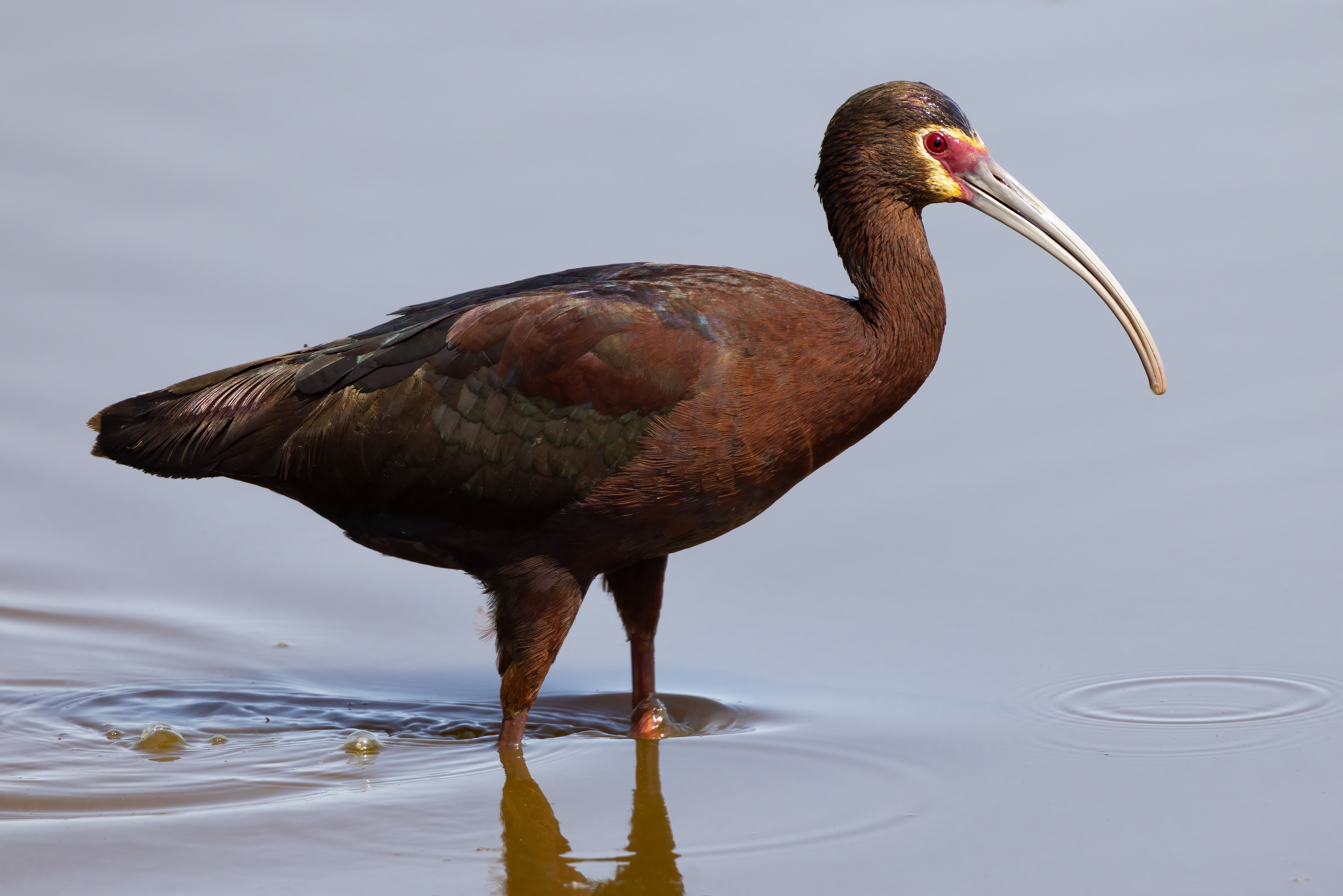
- Adult at the Sacramento National Wildlife Refuge

Conservation status
- Least Concern (IUCN 3.1)

Scientific classification
- Kingdom: Animalia
- Phylum: Chordata
- Class: Aves
- Order: Pelecaniformes
- Family: Threskiornithidae
- Genus: Plegadis
- Species: P. chihi

Binomial name
- Plegadis chihi (Vieillot, 1817)
- Distribution map Breeding Migration Year-round Nonbreeding

Synonyms
- Plegadis falcinellus chihi; Plegadis falcinellus mexicana

= White-faced ibis =

Species of bird

The white-faced ibis (Plegadis chihi) is a wading bird in the ibis family, Threskiornithidae native to the Americas.

This species breeds colonially in marshes, usually nesting in bushes or low trees. Its breeding range extends from southwestern Canada and the western United States south through Mexico, as well as from southeastern Brazil and southeastern Bolivia south to central Argentina, and along the coast of central Chile. Its winter range extends from southern California and Louisiana south to include the rest of its breeding range.

== Description ==
In its non-breeding plumage, the white-faced ibis is very similar to the glossy ibis except that it tends to be slightly smaller and its plumage has a somewhat warmer color. Breeding adults have a pink, bare face bordered with white feathers (rather than a bluish bare face with no bordering feathers), a grey bill, and brighter-colored, redder legs. Adults have red eyes year-round, whereas glossy ibises have dark eyes. Juveniles of the two species are nearly identical.

Measurements:

- Length: 18.1–22.1 in (46–56 cm)
- Weight: 15.9–18.5 oz (450–525 g)
- Wingspan: 35.4–36.6 in (90–93 cm)
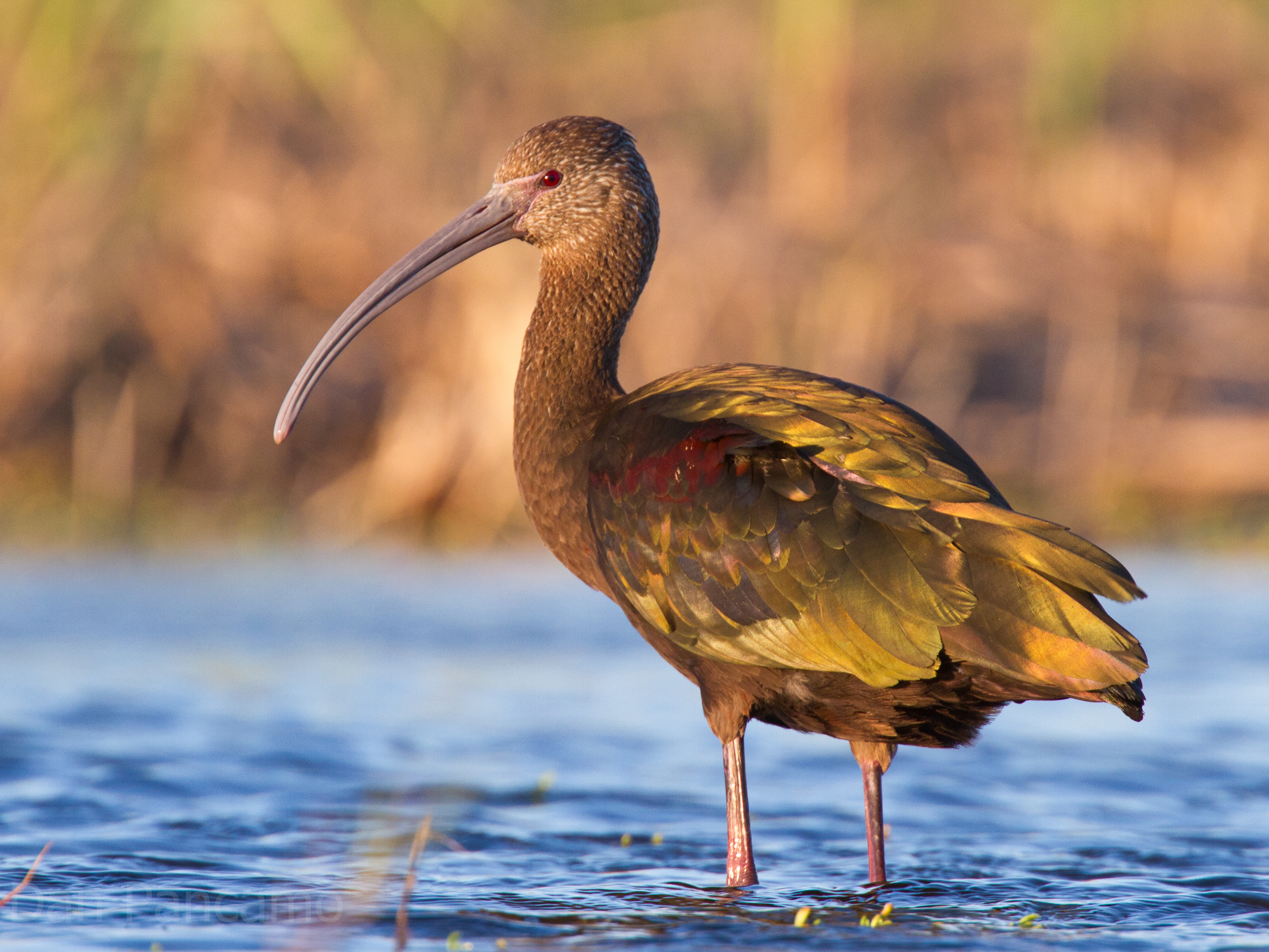
Winter plumage in Quintana, Texas

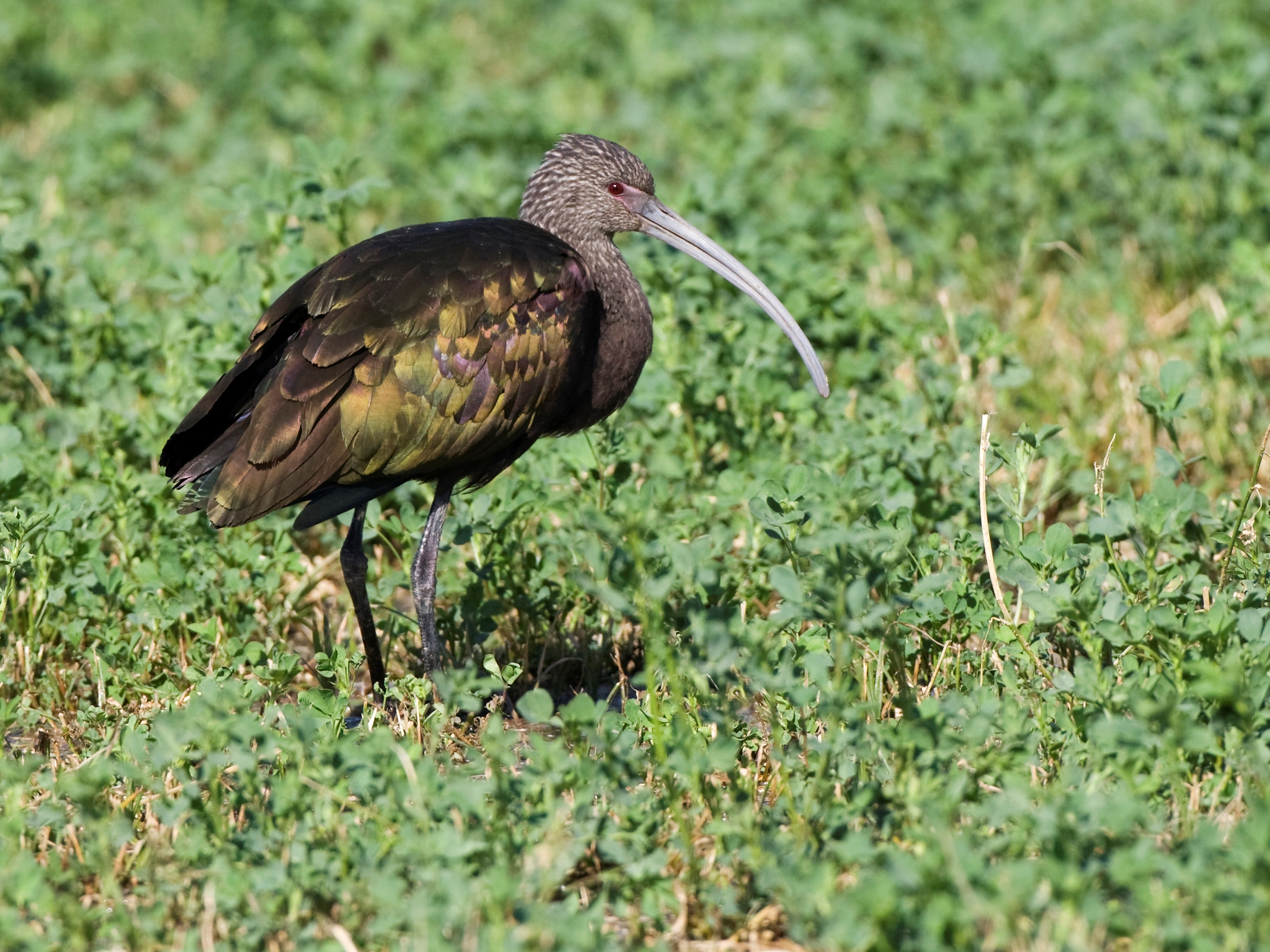
Non-breeding plumage

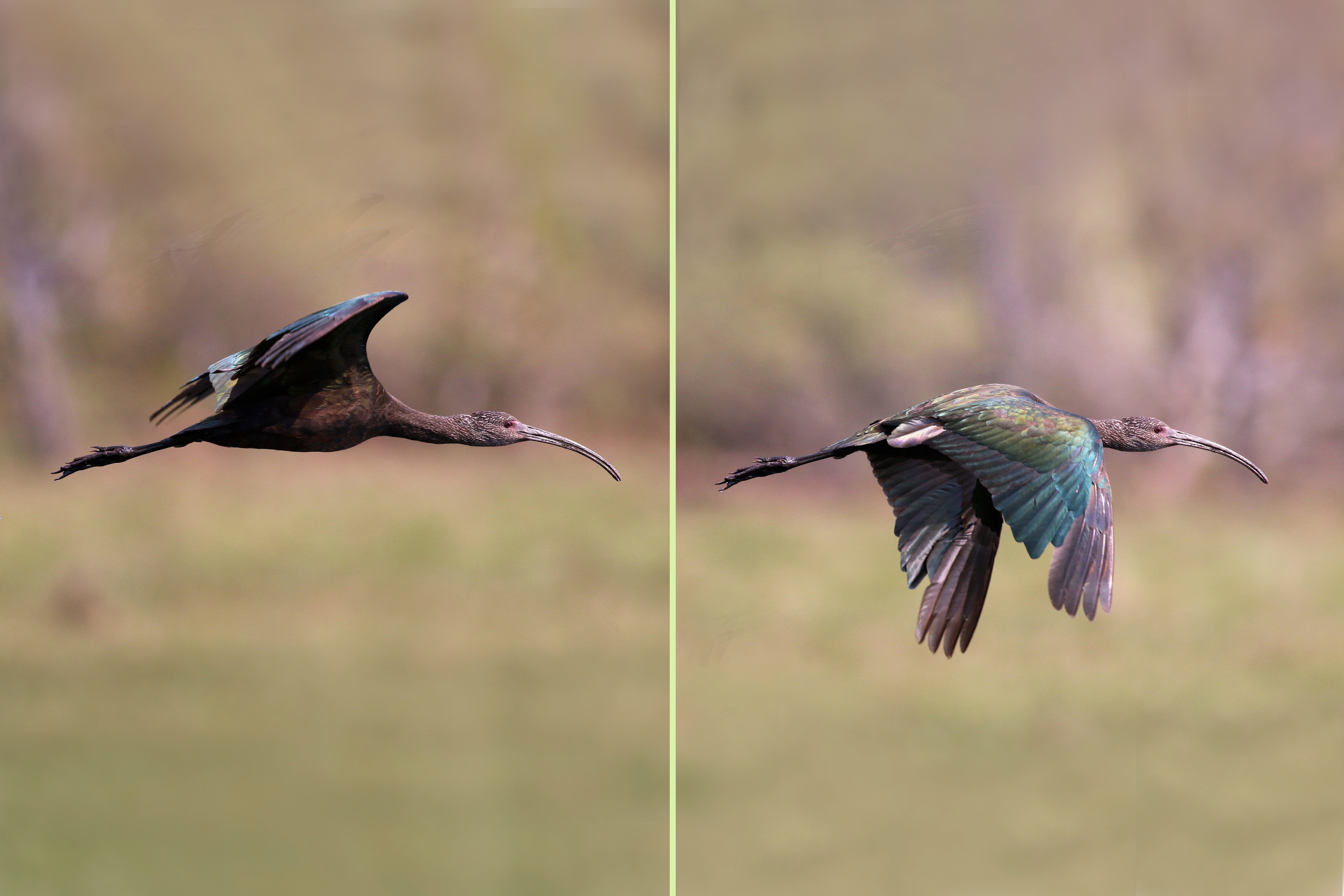
Juvenile
Pantanal, Brazil

== Distribution ==
The white-faced ibis occurs in Canada, the United States, and Central America, and a second subspecies inhabits the southern half of South America, east of the Andes Mountains. In 2012, the total population size was estimated to be 1.2 million individuals, and increasing. The IUCN rates it as being of Least Concern.

Migration and interchange between North and South American subspecies does not occur. Within North America, birds breeding in northern areas of the range move south to wintering areas. For example, breeders in northern California and southern Oregon move to wintering areas in southern California and México or Central America. Some birds breeding in Yellowstone in Wyoming will overwinter in areas such as Texas and coastal Gulf of Mexico regions. Birds are increasingly sighted east of the Mississippi River in the eastern United States and Canada in the summer and autumn.

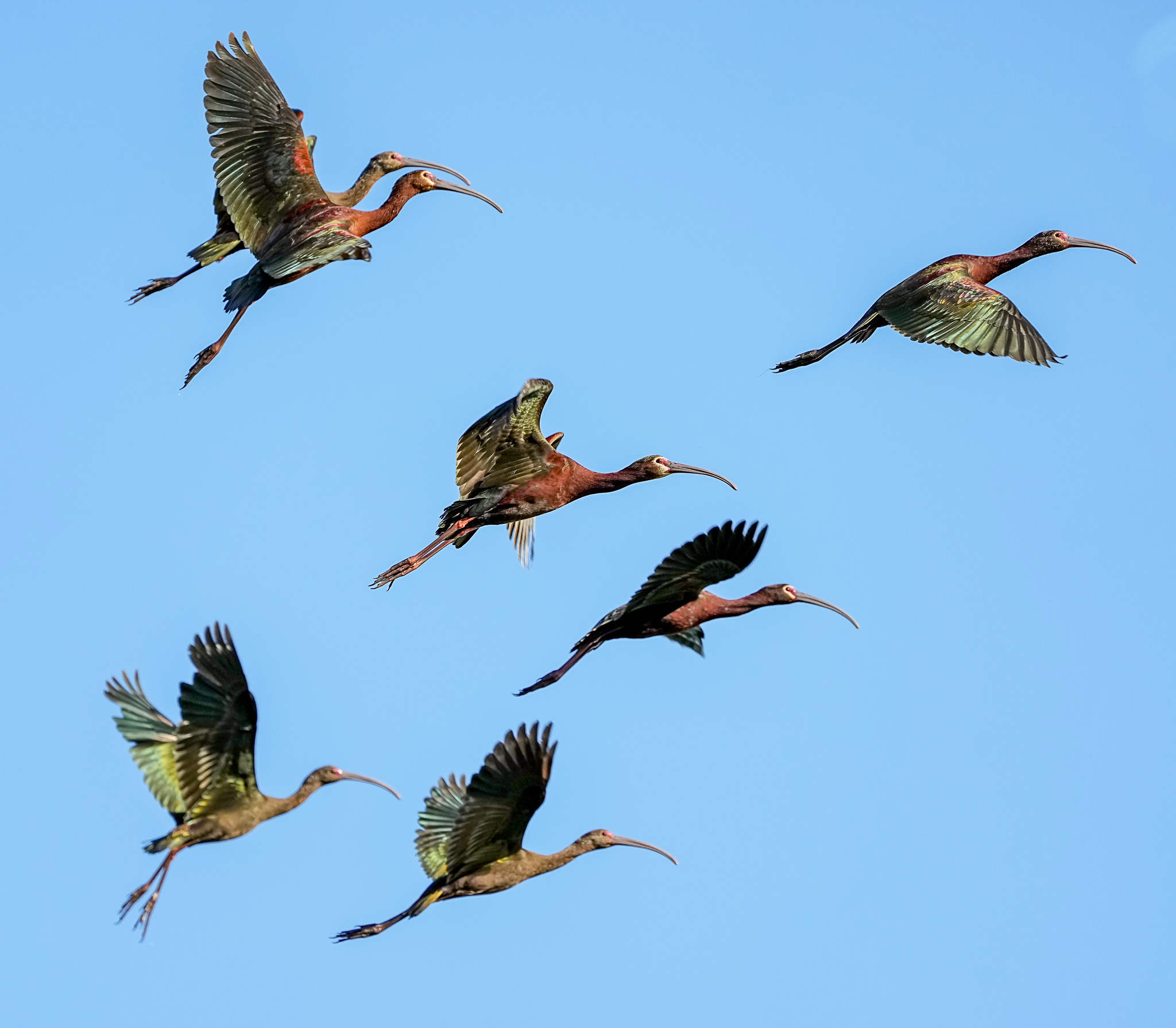
A flock of white-faced ibises take flight.

== Origin ==
The white-faced ibis bears a strong resemblance to the related glossy ibis, and in the past was sometimes considered to be a subspecies of the glossy ibis. Another theory was that a small population of glossy ibis dispersed to the Americas, which became isolated and evolved into a separate species. However, recent molecular phylogenetic studies show that the white-faced ibis may actually be paraphyletic. In fact, members of the white-faced ibis populations in the United States appear to be more closely related to glossy ibises than to members of white-faced ibis populations in southern Brazil.

== Feeding ==
The white-faced ibis eats a variety of organisms, including many invertebrates such as insects, leeches, snails, crayfish and earthworms. It may also eat vertebrates such as fish, newts, and frogs. Its feeding style is to use its bill to probe for prey.

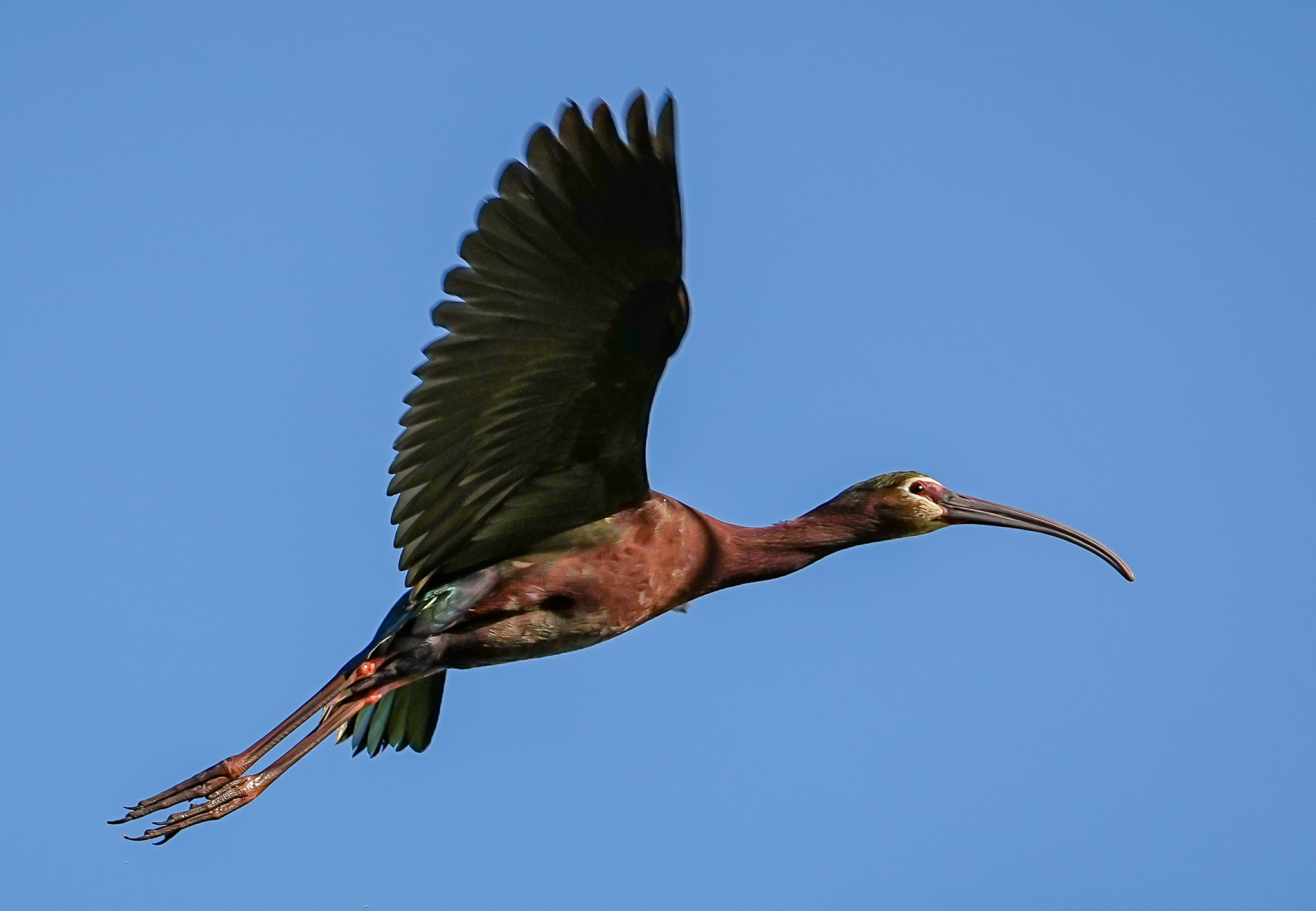
In flight

== Breeding and nesting ==
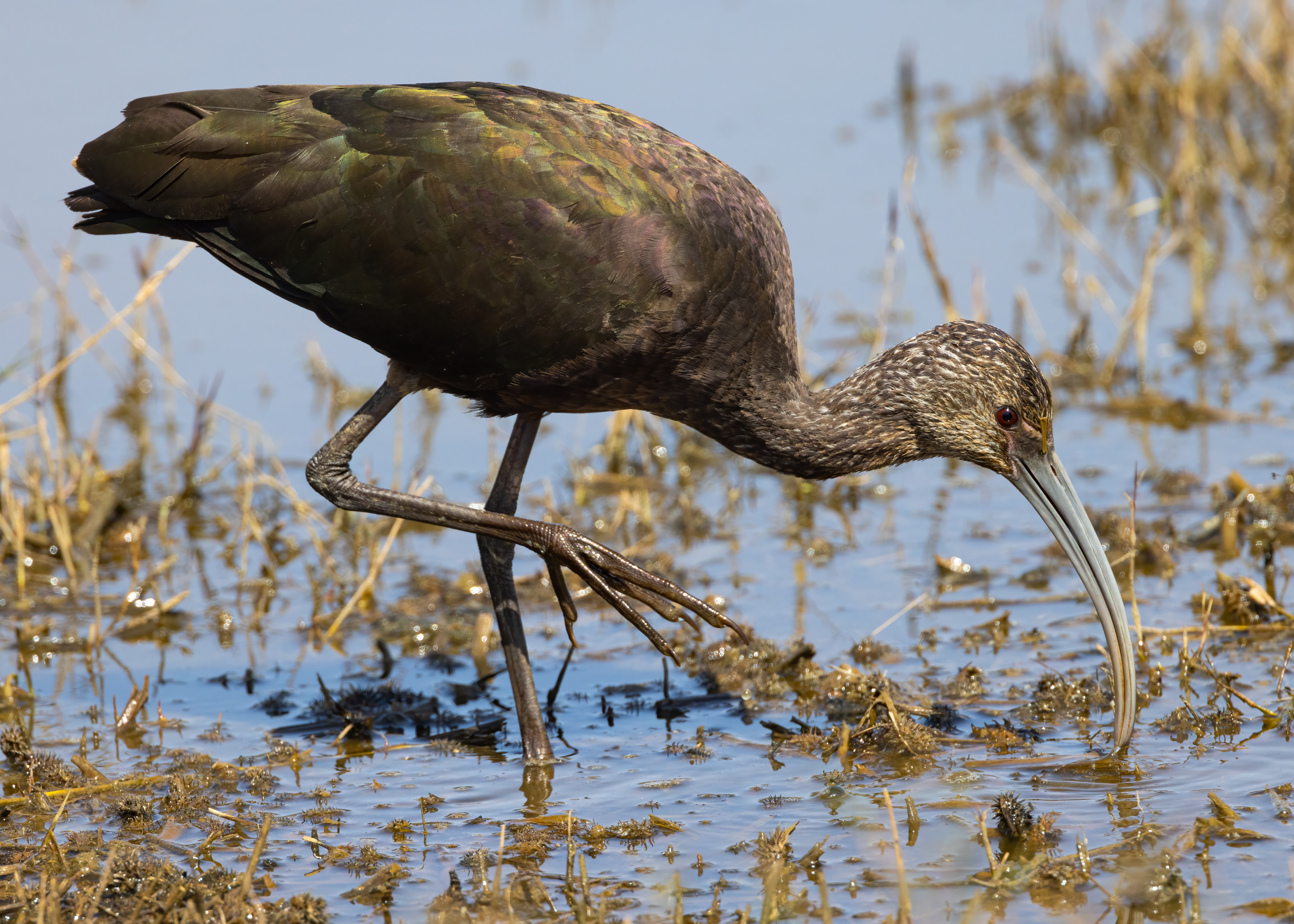
Juvenile feeding

In Yolo Bypass Wildlife Area, California

This species breeds colonially in marshes, usually nesting in bushes or low trees. Its breeding range extends from the western United States south through Mexico, as well as from southeastern Brazil and southeastern Bolivia south to central Argentina, and along the coast of central Chile. Its winter range extends from southern California and Louisiana south to include the rest of its breeding range. The white-faced ibis chooses to nest in the parts of a marsh with dense vegetation such as bulrush, cattails, shrubs, and short trees. It will then build a nest from reeds. The white-faced ibis usually lays three or four blue-green eggs at a time.

== Lifespan ==
White-faced ibises in captivity live up to fourteen years on average. In the wild, white-faced ibises usually live for nine years; however, the oldest recorded wild white-faced ibis lived for fourteen years and six months.

== Threats ==
In the past, the white-faced ibis faced many threats from humans. Studies completed in Utah in the 1960s (before this species was added to the Migratory Bird Treaty Act) showed that 82.9% of recorded deaths in banded birds were a result of being shot. However, the main causes of the decline of this species previously were pesticides and habitat destruction. The pesticide DDT caused eggshells to be so thin and fragile that parent white-faced ibises crushed the eggs when they were incubating them. Also, since this species is so dependent on wetlands and marshes for both feeding and nesting, changes to water systems such as pollution and man-made draining of water habitats had devastating impacts on members of this species in the past. In order to correct these damages, DDT was banned in 1970 and various programs were created to better maintain and protect wetland nesting habitats. Yet, there is still some debate whether populations of white-faced ibises in all geographic areas are recovered and growing.
