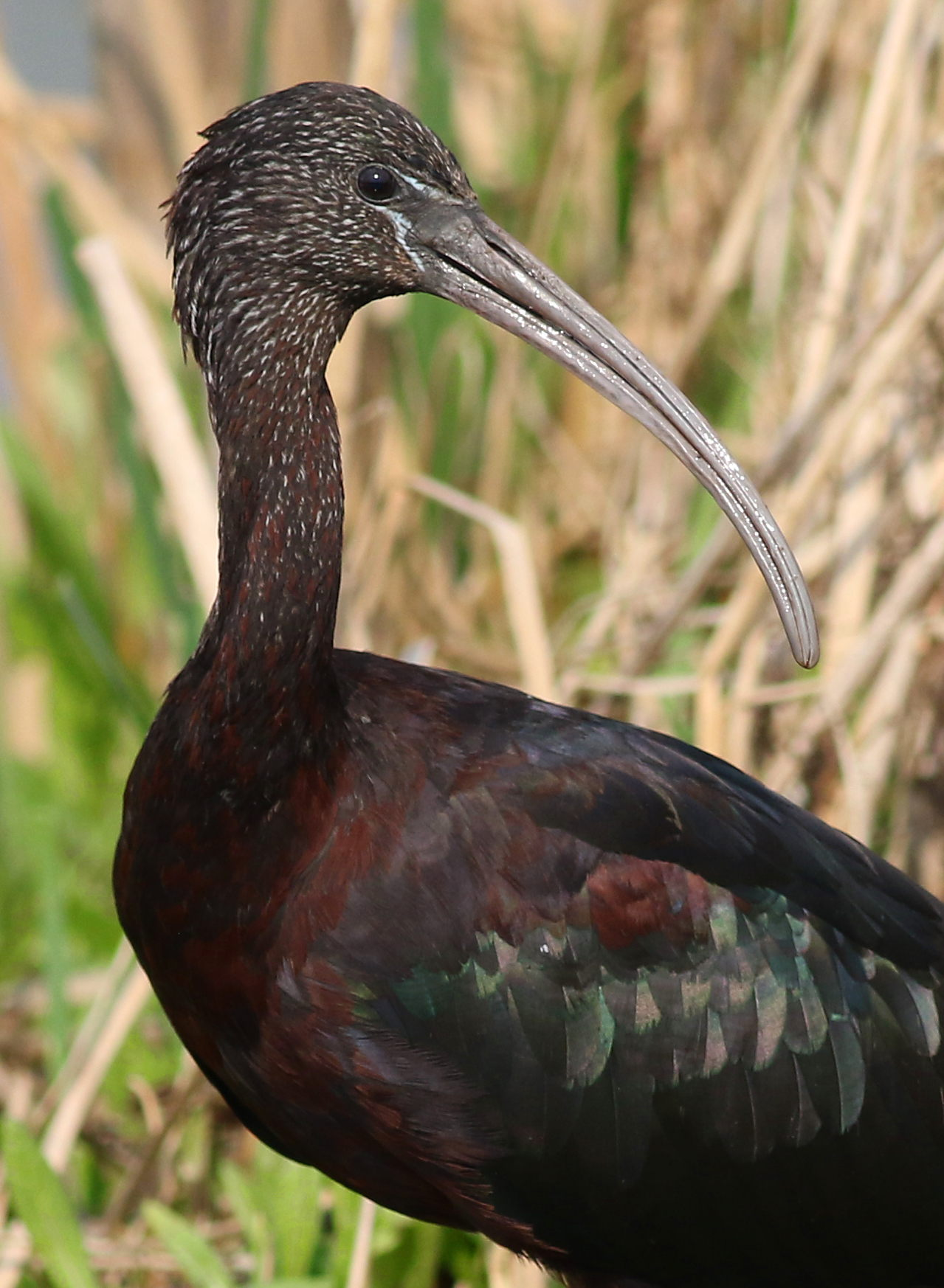
- Glossy ibis (Plegadis falcinellus)

Scientific classification
- Kingdom: Animalia
- Phylum: Chordata
- Class: Aves
- Order: Pelecaniformes
- Family: Threskiornithidae
- Subfamily: Threskiornithinae
- Genus: Plegadis; Kaup, 1829

Type species
- Tantalus falcinellus Linnaeus, 1766

Species
- Plegadis chihi Plegadis falcinellus Plegadis ridgwayi

Synonyms
- Plegadornis C. L. Brehm, 1855

= Plegadis =

Genus of birds

Plegadis is a bird genus in the family Threskiornithidae. The genus name derives from Ancient Greek plegados, "sickle", referring to the distinctive shape of the bill. Member species are found on every continent except Antarctica as well as a number of islands.

== Species ==
The glossy ibis is easily the most widespread of the three species. Plegadis contains the following three species:

Genus Plegadis – Kaup, 1829 – three species
Common name	Scientific name and subspecies	Range	Size and ecology	IUCN status and estimated population
Glossy ibis	Plegadis falcinellus (Linnaeus, 1766)	regions of Europe, Asia, Africa, Australia, and the Atlantic and Caribbean regions of the Americas	Size: Habitat: Diet:	LC
White-faced ibis	Plegadis chihi (Vieillot, 1817)	western United States south through Mexico, as well as from southeastern Brazil and southeastern Bolivia south to central Argentina, and along the coast of central Chile.	Size: Habitat: Diet:	LC
Puna ibis	Plegadis ridgwayi (Allen, 1876)	Argentina, Bolivia, Chile, and Peru	Size: Habitat: Diet:	LC

A further two fossil species have been placed in the genus:

- Plegadis paganus from the Early Miocene deposits in France; however, it is now placed in Gerandibis pagana.
- Plegadis pharangites
