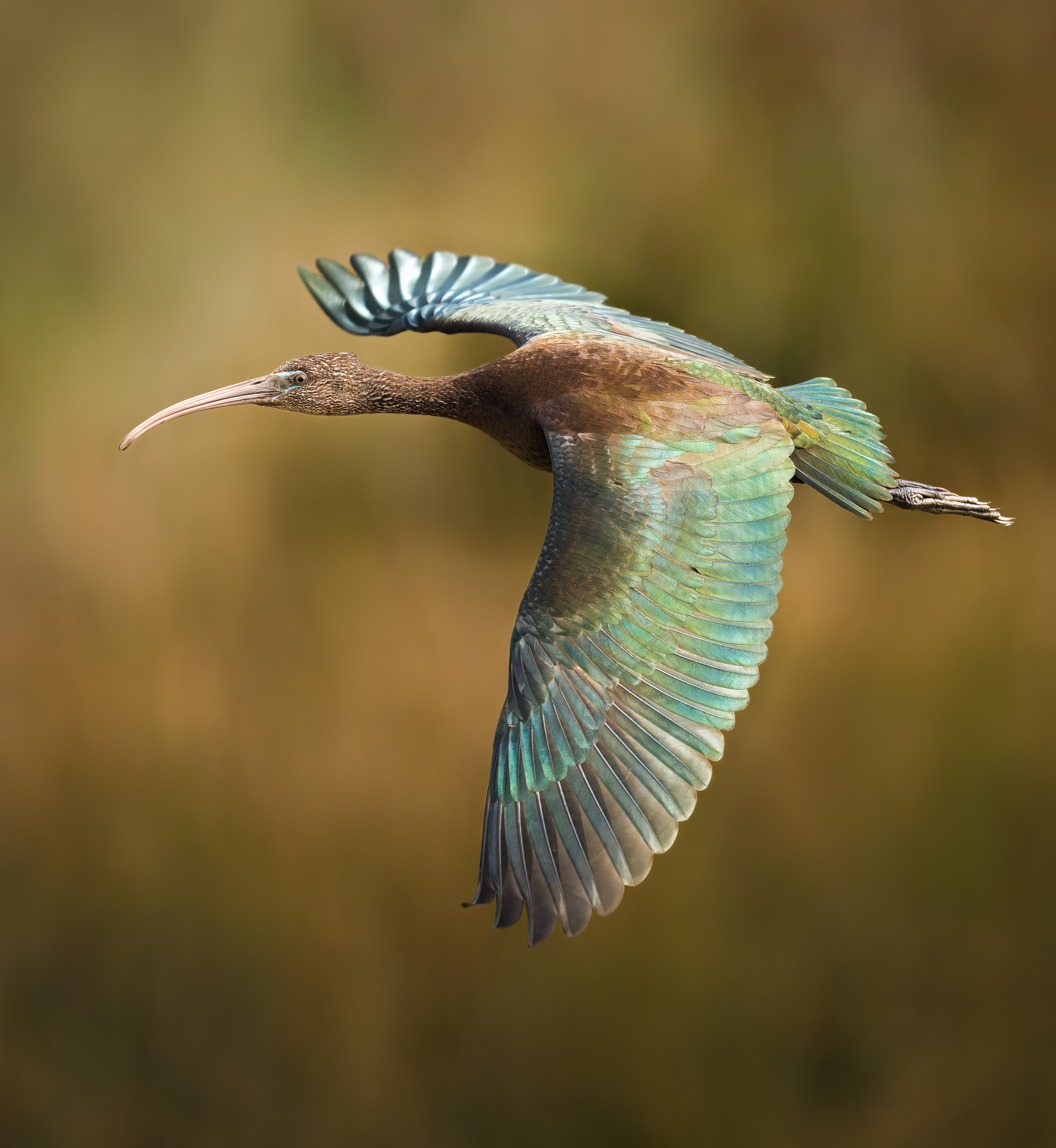
- Non-breeding plumage: Glossy Ibis call, in Baix Ebre, Catalonia, Spain

Conservation status
- Least Concern (IUCN 3.1)

Scientific classification
- Kingdom: Animalia
- Phylum: Chordata
- Class: Aves
- Order: Pelecaniformes
- Family: Threskiornithidae
- Genus: Plegadis
- Species: P. falcinellus

Binomial name
- Plegadis falcinellus (Linnaeus, 1766)
- Geographical distribution. Breeding Migration Year-round Nonbreeding

Synonyms
- Tantalus falcinellus (protonym); Ibis falcinellus; Falcinellus falcinellus; Tringa autumnalis Hasselqvist, 1762; Tantalus bengalensis Lichtenstein, 1793

= Glossy ibis =

- Breeding plumage

Species of bird

The glossy ibis (Plegadis falcinellus) is a water bird in the order Pelecaniformes and the ibis and spoonbill family Threskiornithidae. The scientific name derives from Ancient Greek plegados and Latin, falcis, both meaning "sickle" and referring to the distinctive shape of the bill.

The historical name black curlew was used for the glossy ibis in Norfolk at least until the early 19th century, and this name also appears in Anglo-Saxon literature. Yalden and Albarella do not mention this species as occurring in medieval England.

== Distribution ==
This is the most widespread ibis species, breeding in scattered sites in warm regions of Europe, Asia, Africa, Australia, and the Atlantic and Caribbean regions of the Americas. It is thought to have originated in the Old World and spread naturally from Africa to northern South America in the 19th century, from where it spread to North America. The glossy ibis was first documented in the New World in 1817 (New Jersey). Audubon saw the species just once in Florida in 1832. It expanded its range substantially northwards in the 1940s and to the west in the 1980s. This species is migratory; most European birds winter in Africa, and in North America birds from north of the Carolinas winter farther south. Though generally suspected to be a migratory species in India, the glossy ibis is resident in western India. Birds from other populations may disperse widely outside the breeding season. It is increasing in Europe, after earlier major declines in the 19th and early 20th centuries due to uncontrolled heavy hunting pressure and habitat loss. Birds which arrived in Great Britain and Ireland were routinely shot as trophies until the 1920s, when attitudes started to change. It disappeared as a regular breeding bird in Spain in the early 20th century, but with legal protection re-established itself in 1993 and has since rapidly increased with thousands of pairs in several colonies. It has also established rapidly increasing breeding colonies in France, a country with very few breeding records before the 2000s. However, in Italy, where illegal hunting has been a continuing problem despite legal protection since 1977, the increase in the population has been markedly lower with only 10–50 pairs breeding. An increasing number of non-breeding visitors are seen in northwestern Europe, a region where glossy ibis records historically were very rare. For example, there appears to be a growing trend for birds to winter in Britain and Ireland, with at least 22 sightings in 2010. In 2014, a pair attempted to breed in Lincolnshire, the first such attempt in Britain. The first successful breeding in Britain was a pair which fledged one young in Cambridgeshire in 2022. A few birds now spend most summers in Ireland, but there is no present evidence of breeding. In New Zealand, a few birds arrive there annually, mostly in the month of July; recently a pair bred amongst a colony of royal spoonbill. Glossy ibis have been a breeding species in Australia since the 1930s. In India, they are now a breeding species with colonies now seen in agricultural areas, in forested areas with bamboo thickets and breeding alongside other colonially nesting waterbirds. Year-long studies have also shown glossy ibises to be foraging in agricultural wetlands and flooded farmlands in western India.

== Description ==
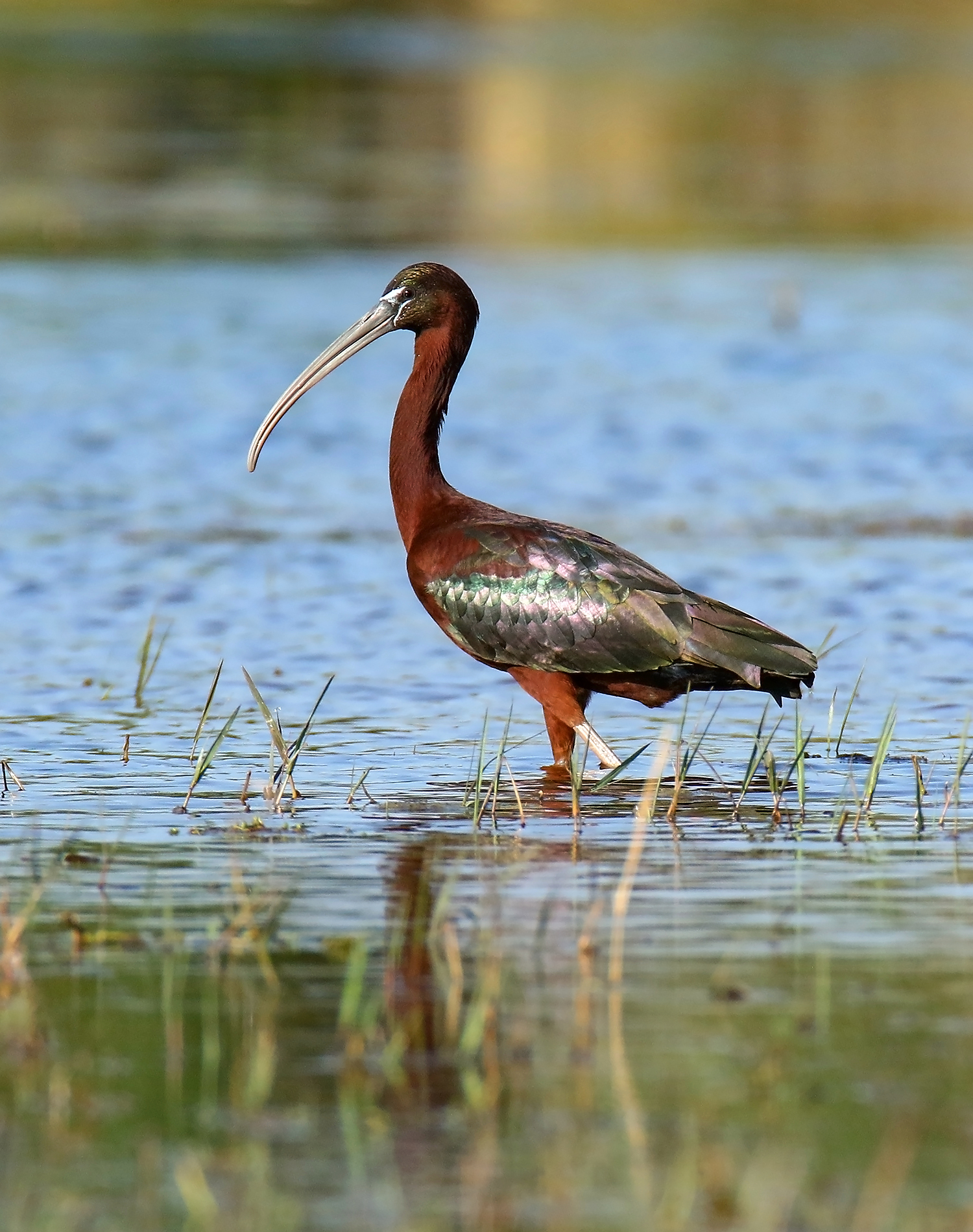
Glossy ibis in bright sunlight showing the wing feather gloss

This species is a mid-sized ibis. It is 48–66 cm (19–26 in) long, averaging around 59.4 cm (23.4 in) with an 80–105 cm (31–41 in) wingspan. The culmen measures 9.7 to 14.4 cm (3.8 to 5.7 in) in length, each wing measures 24.8–30.6 cm (9.8–12.0 in), the tail is 9–11.2 cm (3.5–4.4 in) and the tarsus measures 6.8–11.3 cm (2.7–4.4 in). The weight can range from 485 to 970 g (1.069 to 2.138 lb). Breeding adults have reddish-brown bodies and strongly iridescent wing feathers, bottle-green to bronzed or purple depending on the light angle. Adult breeding birds have a narrow white facial band above and below the bill, much less obvious than in the closely related and otherwise very similar white-faced ibis. Non-breeders and juveniles have duller bodies, with the dark brown head and neck finely streaked with white. It has a brownish bill, dark facial skin bordered above and below in blue-grey (non-breeding) to cobalt blue (breeding), and red-brown legs. Unlike herons, ibises fly with necks outstretched, their flight being graceful and often in V formation.

Sounds made by this rather quiet ibis include a variety of croaks and grunts, including a hoarse grrrr made when breeding.

== Behaviour ==
Glossy ibises undertake dispersal movements after breeding and are highly nomadic. The more northerly populations are fully migratory and travel on a broad front, for example across the Sahara Desert. Glossy ibis ringed in the Black Sea seem to prefer the Sahel and West Africa to winter, those ringed in the Caspian Sea have been found to move to East Africa, the Arabian peninsula and as far east as Pakistan and India. Numbers of glossy ibis in western India varied dramatically seasonally with the highest numbers being seen in the winter and summers, and drastically declining in the monsoon likely indicating local movements to a suitable area to breed. Populations in temperate regions breed during the local spring, while tropical populations nest to coincide with the rainy season. Nesting is often in mixed-species colonies. When not nesting, flocks of over 100 individuals may occur on migration, and during the winter or dry seasons the species is usually found foraging in small flocks. Glossy ibises often roost communally at night in large flocks, with other species, occasionally in trees which can be some distance from wetland feeding areas.

== Habitat ==
Glossy ibises feed in very shallow water and nest in freshwater or brackish wetlands with tall dense stands of emergent vegetation such as reeds, papyrus (or rushes) and low trees or bushes. They show a preference for marshes at the margins of lakes and rivers but can also be found at lagoons, flood-plains, wet meadows, swamps, reservoirs, sewage ponds, paddies and irrigated farmland. When using farmlands in western India, glossy ibis exhibited strong scale-dependent use of the landscape seasonally. They preferred using areas with >200 ha of wetlands during the summer, and using areas that had intermediate amounts of wetlands (50-100 ha) in the other seasons, though did not necessarily forage in the wetlands. It is less commonly found in coastal locations such as estuaries, deltas, salt marshes and coastal lagoons. Preferred roosting sites are normally in large trees which may be distant from the feeding areas. When human persecution is absent they roost in cities, even using trees beside busy highways and other roads.

== Breeding ==
An adult Glossy Ibis feeding its young.

The nest is usually a platform of twigs and vegetation positioned at least 1 m (3.3 ft) above water, sometimes up to 7 m (23 ft) high, in dense stands of emergent vegetation, low trees, or bushes. Three to four eggs (occasionally five) are laid, and are incubated by both male and female birds for between 20 and 23 days. The young can leave the nest after about seven days, but the parents continue to feed them for another 6 or 7 weeks. The young fledge in about 28 days.

Juveniles foraging in a floodplain

== Diet ==
The diet of the glossy ibis is variable according to the season and is very dependent on what is available. Prey includes adult and larval insects such as aquatic beetles, dragonflies, damselflies, grasshoppers, crickets, flies and caddisflies, Annelida including leeches, molluscs (e.g. snails and mussels), crustaceans (e.g. crabs and crayfish) and occasionally fish, amphibians, lizards, small snakes and nestling birds.

== Gallery ==
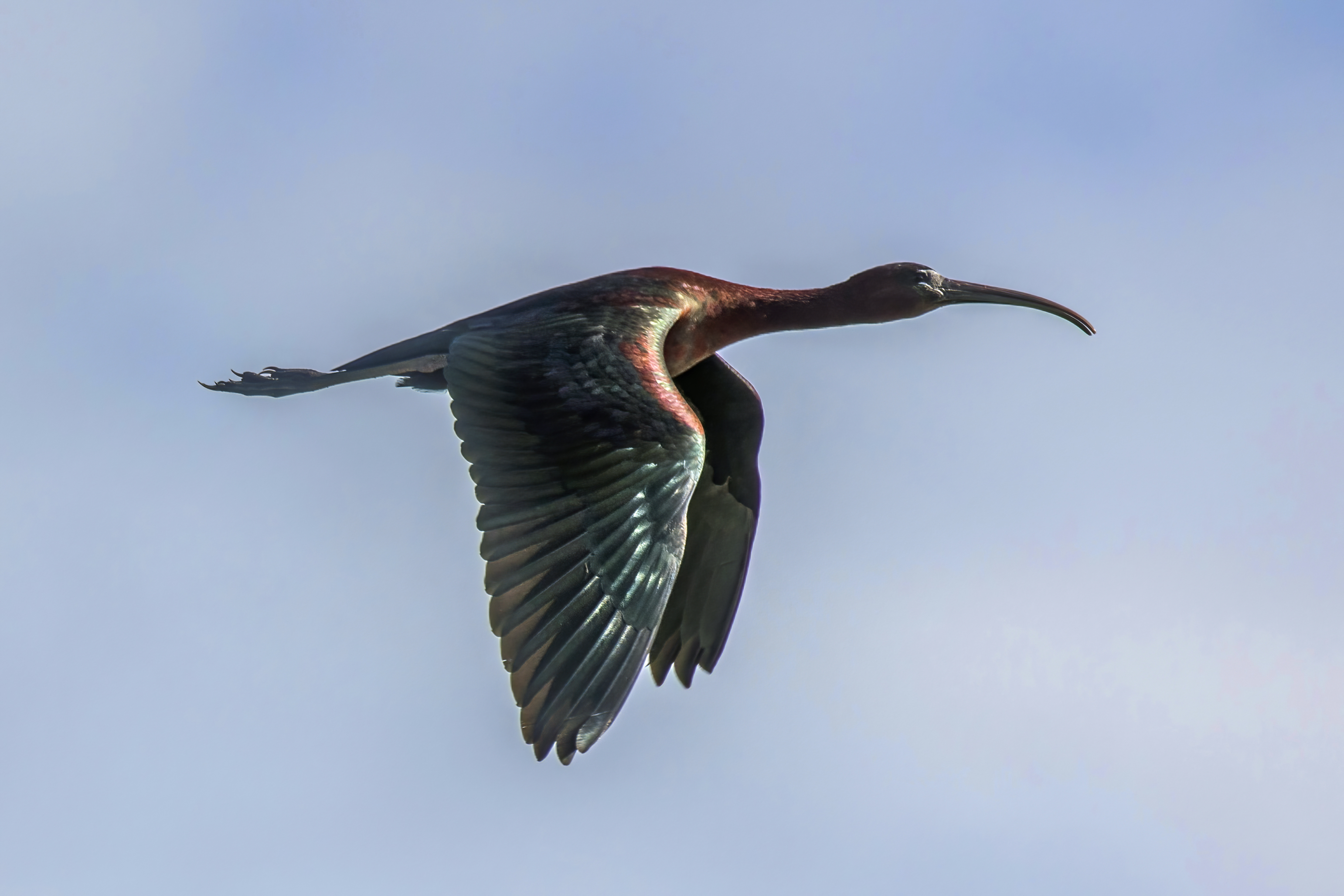
In flight from above, Huelva, Spain

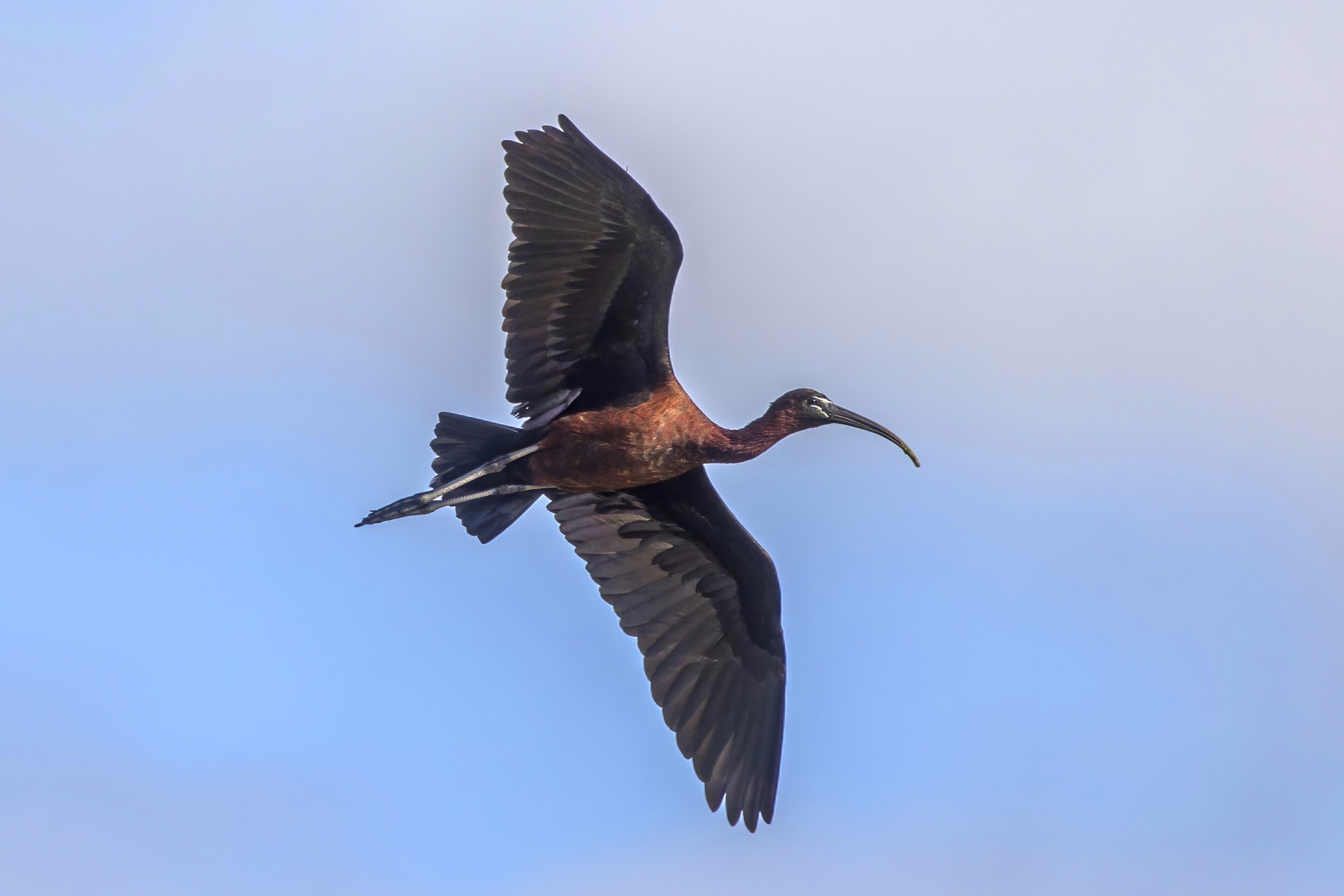
In flight from below, Huelva, Spain

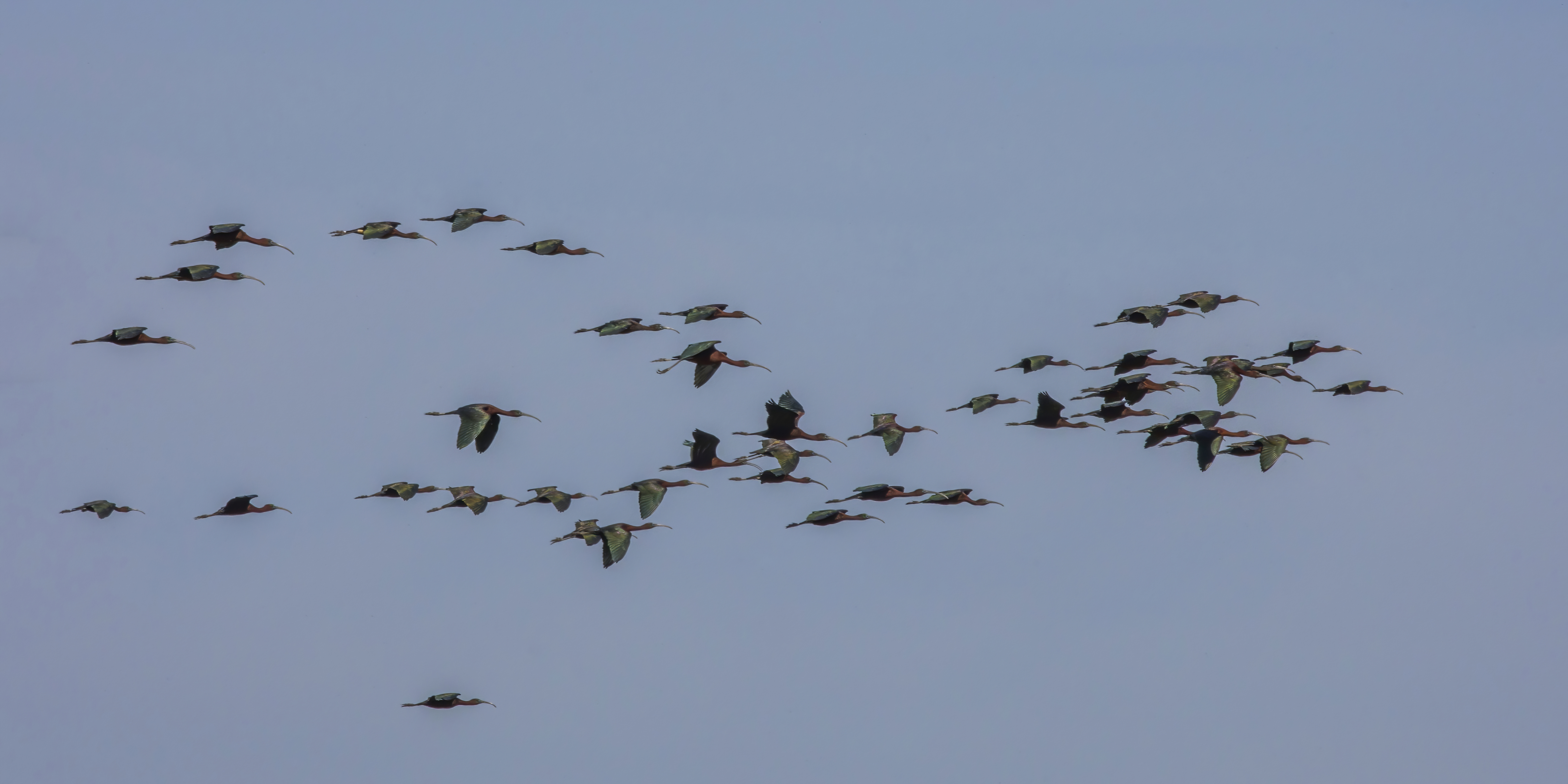
Flock in flight, Huelva, Spain

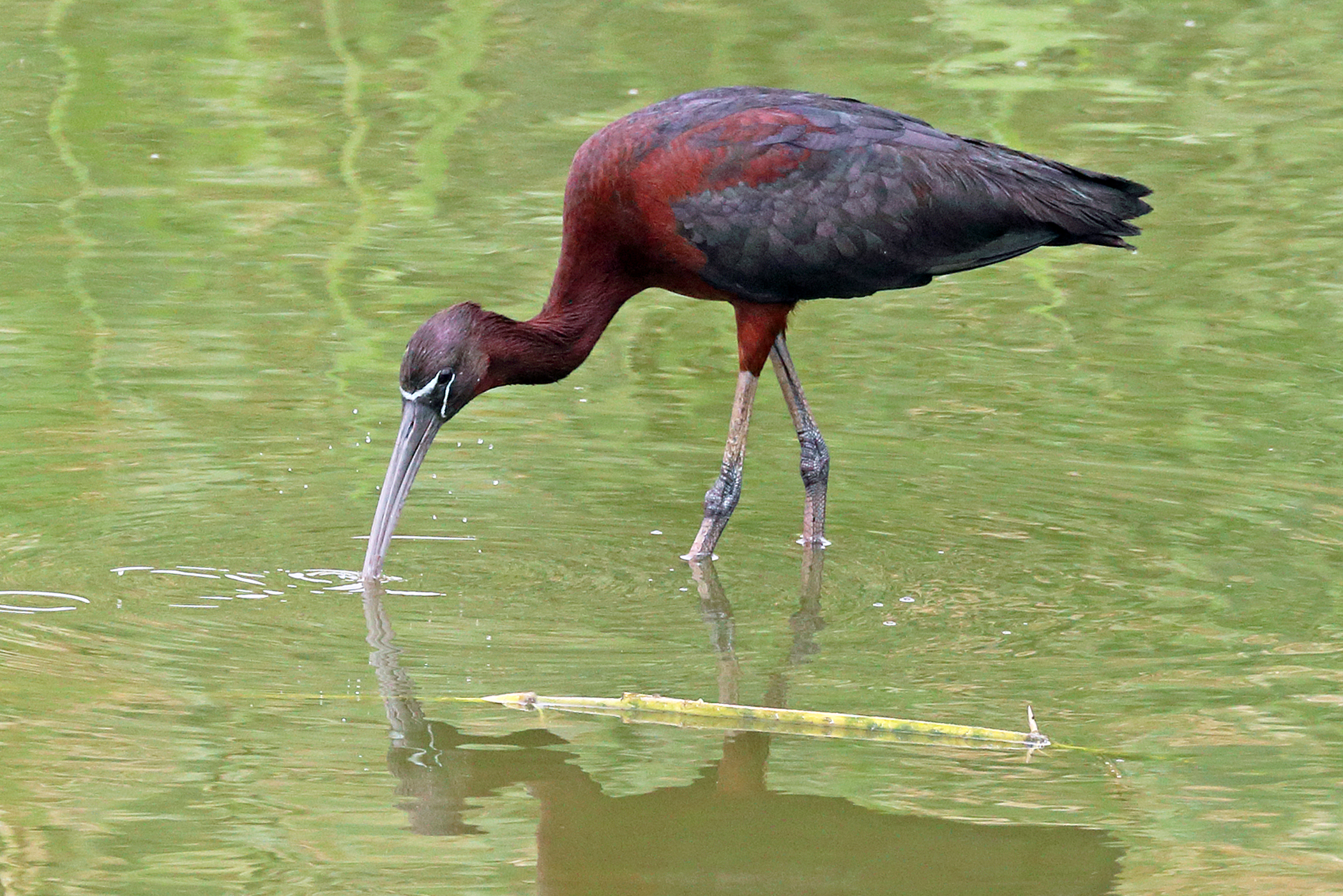
In Aqaba, Jordan

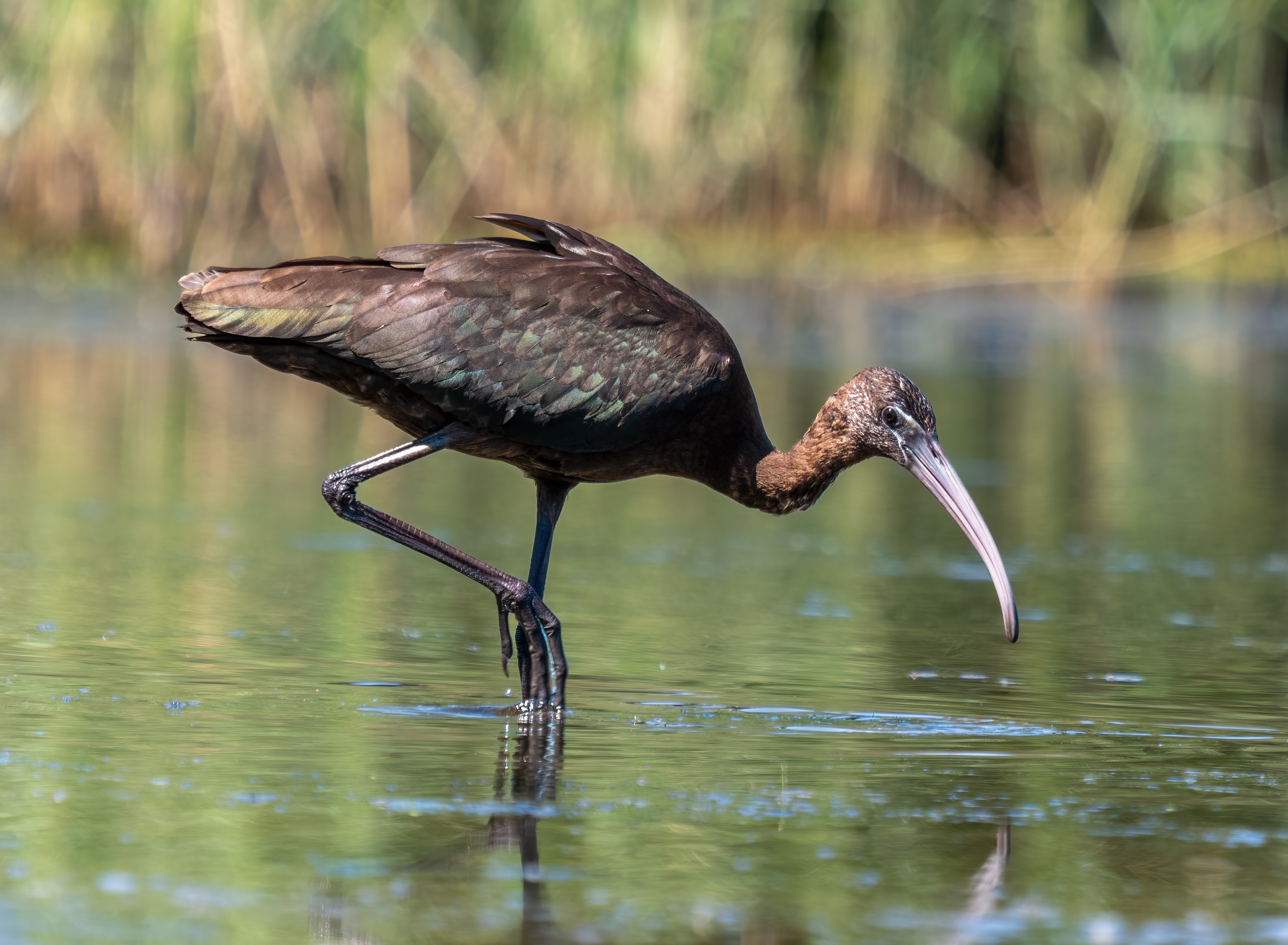
Nonbreeding plumage, in New York

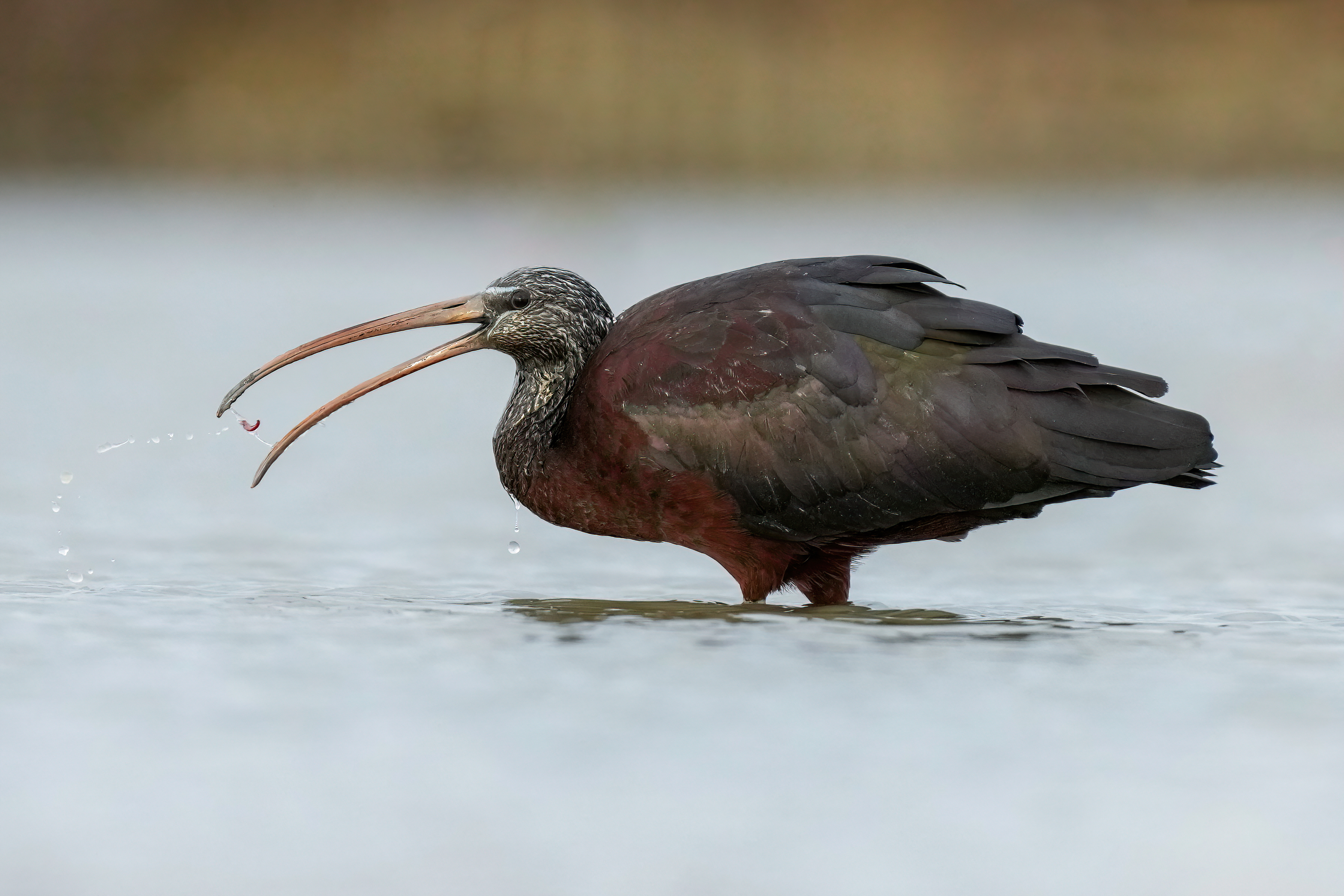
Eating a worm, Camargue, France

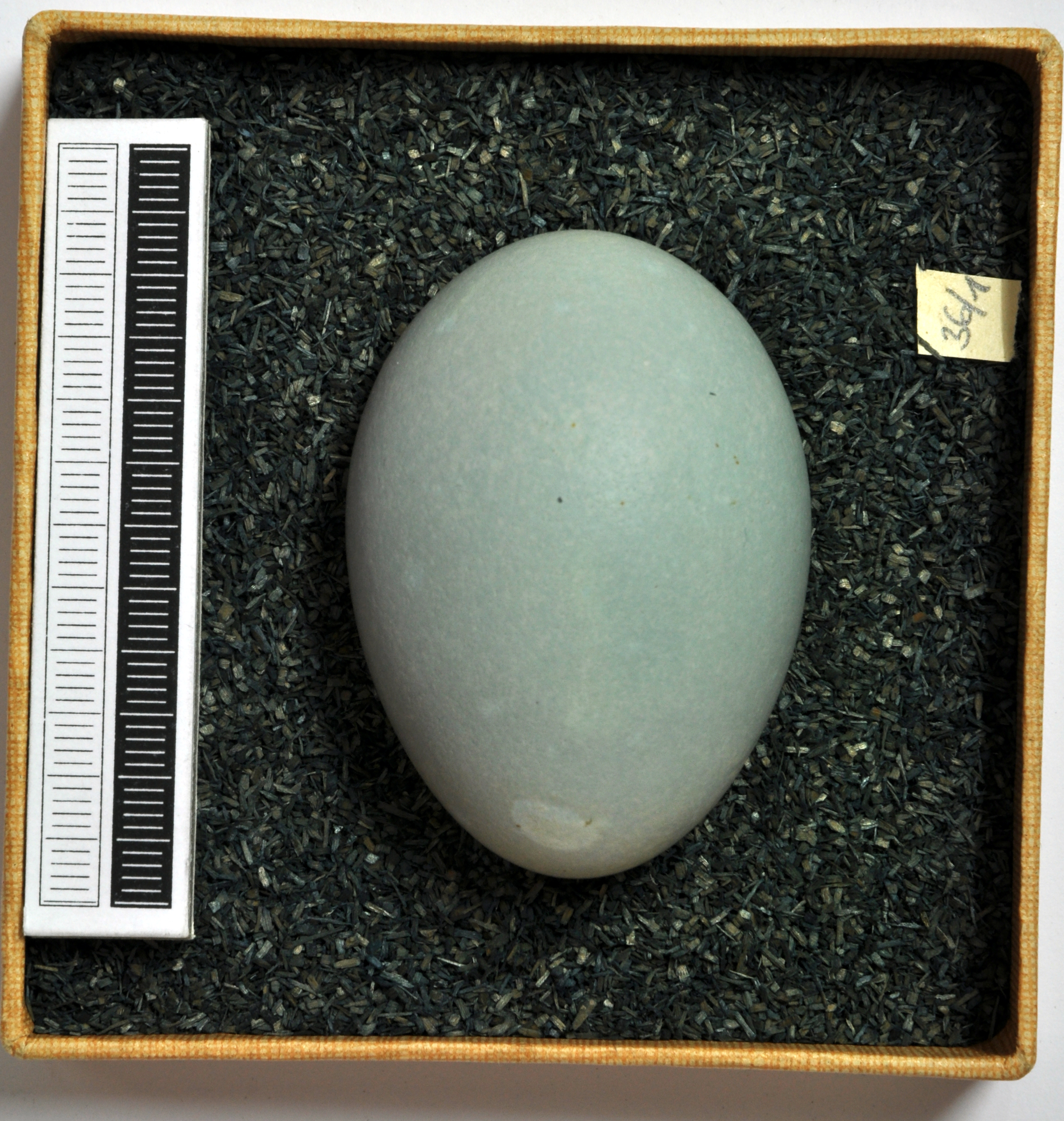
Egg, Collection Museum Wiesbaden

== Conservation ==
The glossy ibis is one of the species to which the Agreement on the Conservation of African-Eurasian Migratory Waterbirds (AEWA) applies. Glossy ibises can be threatened by wetland habitat degradation and loss through drainage, increased salinity, groundwater extraction and invasion by exotic plants.
