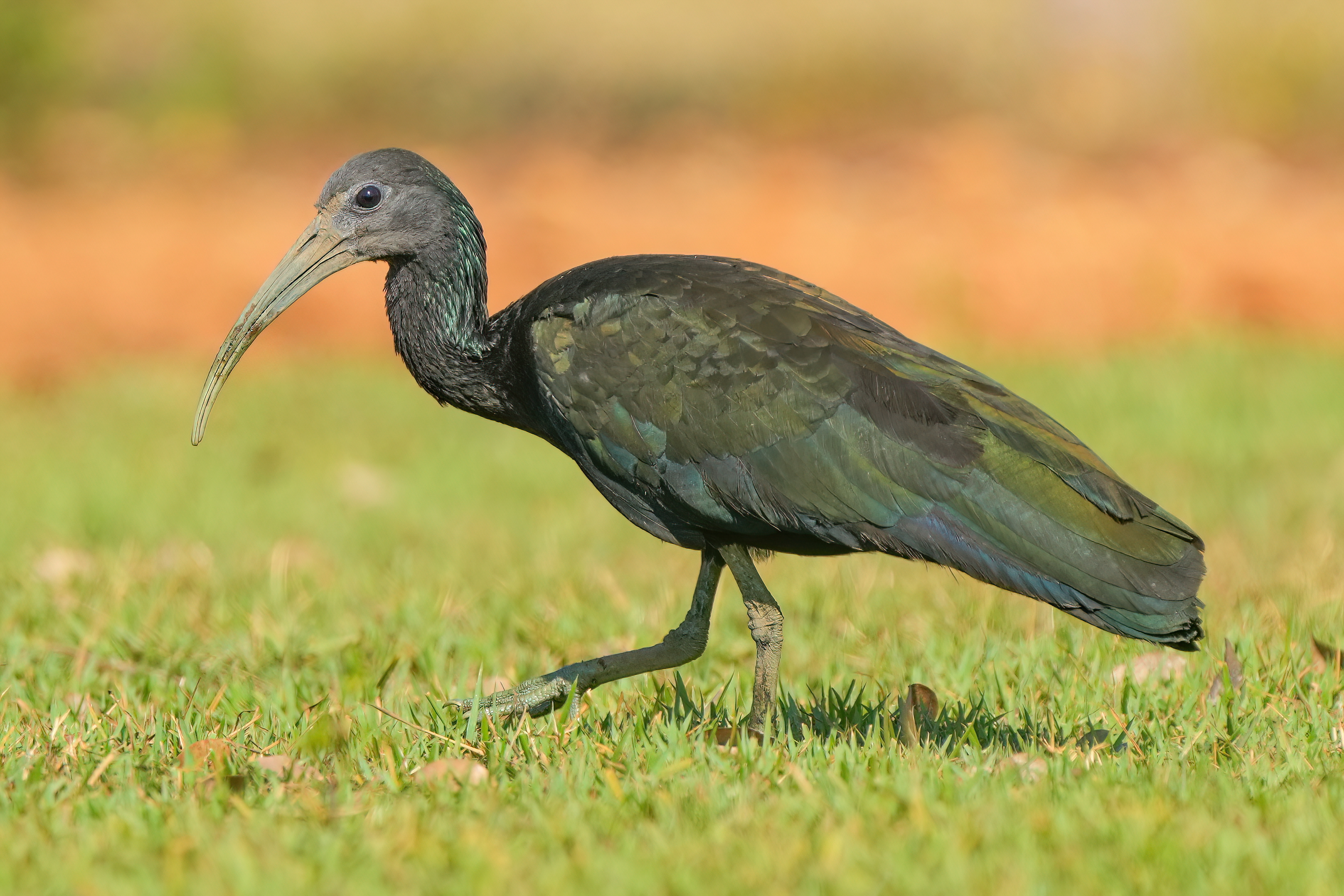
- in the Pantanal, Brazil

Conservation status
- Least Concern (IUCN 3.1)

Scientific classification
- Kingdom: Animalia
- Phylum: Chordata
- Class: Aves
- Order: Pelecaniformes
- Family: Threskiornithidae
- Genus: Mesembrinibis; J.L. Peters, 1930
- Species: M. cayennensis

Binomial name
- Mesembrinibis cayennensis (Gmelin, 1789)

= Green ibis =

Species of bird

The green ibis (Mesembrinibis cayennensis), also known as the Cayenne ibis, is a wading bird in the ibis family Threskiornithidae. It is the only member of the genus Mesembrinibis.

This is a resident breeder from Honduras through Nicaragua, Costa Rica and western Panama, and South America to northern Argentina. It undertakes some local seasonal movements in the dry season.

== Taxonomy ==
The green ibis was formally described in 1789 by the German naturalist Johann Friedrich Gmelin in his revised and expanded edition of Carl Linnaeus's Systema Naturae. He placed it in the genus Tantalus and coined the binomial name Tantalus cayennensis. Gmelin based his description on the "Cayenne ibis" that had been described in 1785 by the English ornithologist John Latham in his book A General Synopsis of Birds . Latham had based his own description on the "Le Courlis des Bois " and the "Courly vert, de Cayenne" that the French polymath, the Comte de Buffon had included in his Histoire Naturelle des Oiseaux. The green ibis is now the only species placed in the genus Mesembrinibis that was introduced in 1930 by James Lee Peters. The genus name Mesembrinibis is a combination of the Greek word mesēmbrinos, meaning "southern" (from mesēmbria, meaning "south") and ibis. The specific epithet cayennensis means "of Cayenne or French Guiana". The species is monotypic: no subspecies are recognised. The species is also sometimes known as Cayenne ibis.

DNA–DNA hybridization studies show that the species falls squarely into the New World ibis clade, with its closest relatives being the sharp-tailed ibis, the American white ibis and the buff-necked ibis.

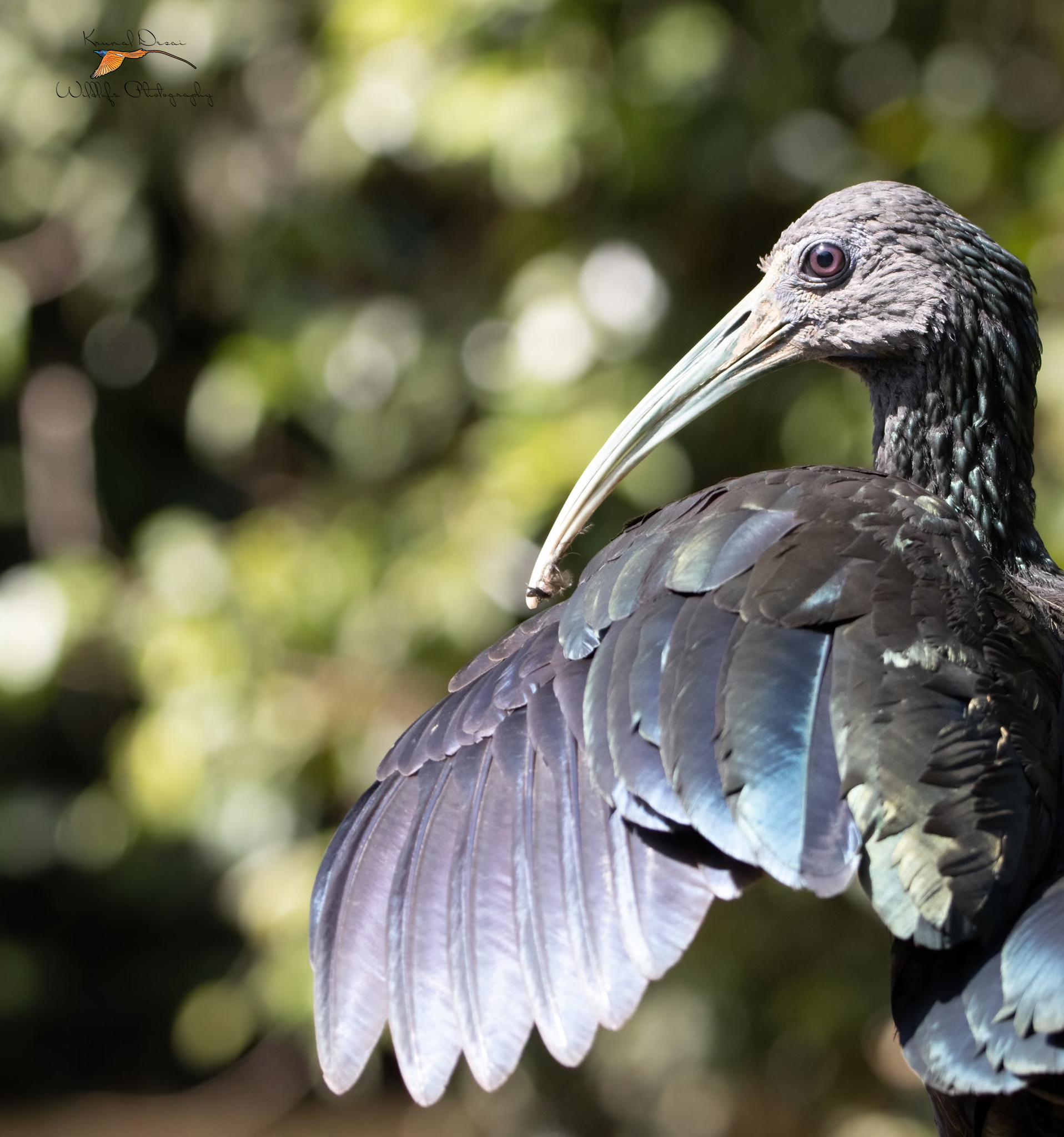
Green ibis perched on log in Tortuguero National Park.

== Description ==
The green ibis is a medium-sized ibis, with short legs and a long, slender, decurved bill. It measures 45–60 cm (18–24 in) in length and ranges from 700 to 890 g (1.5 to 2.0 lb) in mass. The sexes, which are identical in plumage, overlap somewhat in measurements, though the largest birds are male. Breeding adults have glossy greenish-black bodies, pale green legs and bill, and grey bare facial skin patches. Juveniles are much duller, but can be distinguished from the similar glossy ibis by their bulkier shape, shorter legs and broader wings. This species, like other ibises, flies with neck outstretched. Its flight is heavy, with fewer glides and jerkier wingbeats than its relatives.

It has a hollow, hooting, accelerating call, most often heard at dawn and dusk. Transcribed as kro kro or koro koro, the call is described as "mellow".

=== Similar species ===
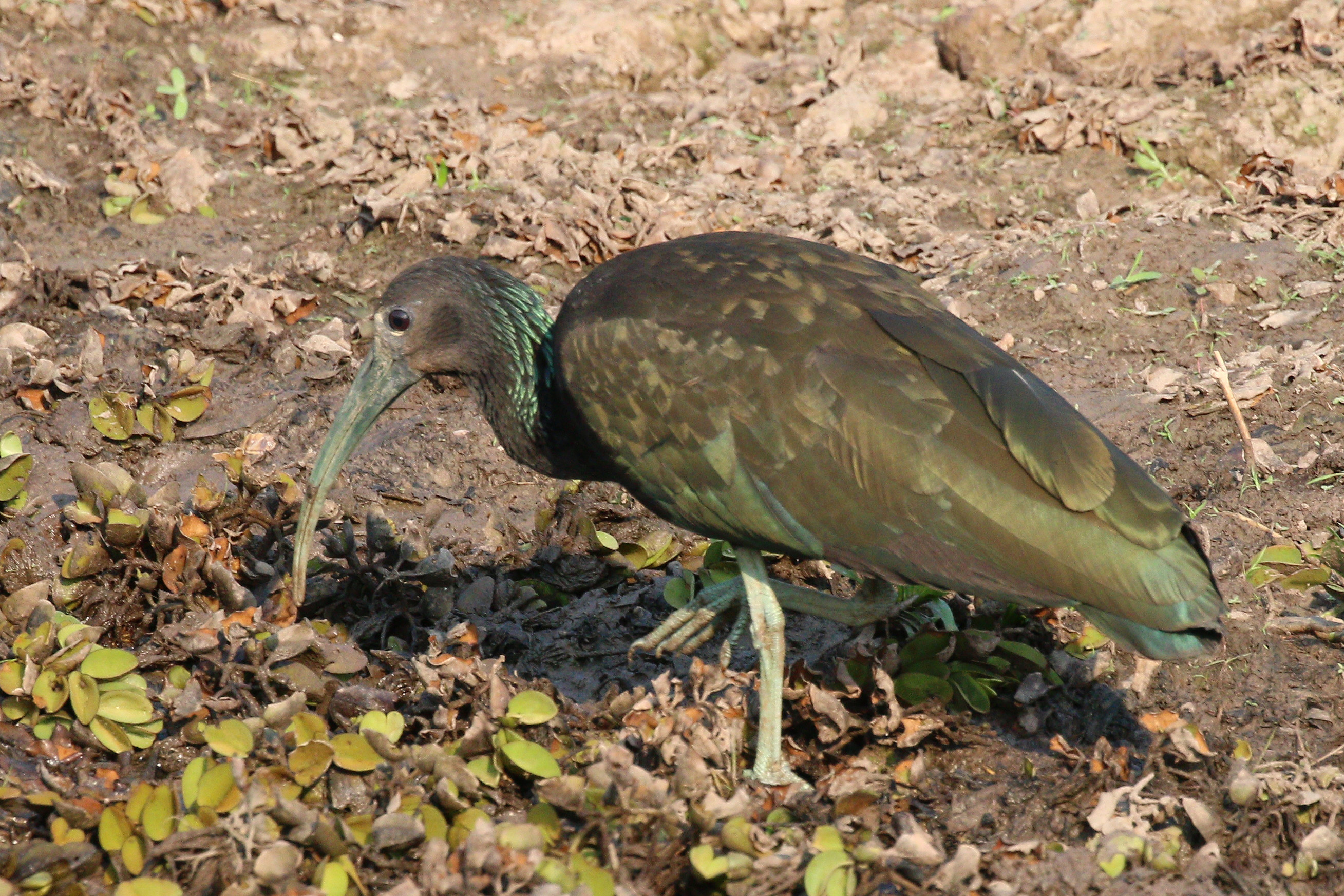
in the Pantanal, Brazil

If seen in good light, the green ibis is distinctively dark, and unlikely to be confused with any other ibis. In poor light, however, it might be confused with the glossy ibis; the latter (which is bronzy-maroon in color) has longer legs and a slimmer build.

== Distribution and habitat ==
The green ibis is found from Costa Rica south to northern Argentina and Paraguay. However, there have been sightings from as far north as Honduras, and fossil records show the species formerly occurred as far north as Kansas in the United States. It is found in a variety of forested wetland habitats, particularly swamps and along the edges of rivers and lakes, at altitudes up to 500 m (1,600 ft).

== Behaviour ==
The green ibis is largely crepuscular. Less gregarious than its relatives, it is usually seen alone or in pairs. When it does forage in mixed-species flocks, it tends to remain on the fringes, usually among other green ibises. It regularly perches in trees.

=== Feeding ===
Like other ibises, it eats fish, frogs and other water creatures, as well as insects.

=== Breeding ===
Its nest is a flimsy platform of twigs built high in a tree. It has been recorded harassing sunbitterns nesting in the same tree.

== Conservation status and threats ==
Because of its huge range and large population, the green ibis is rated as a species of least concern by the International Union for Conservation of Nature; however, its numbers do appear to be decreasing. It is at least occasionally hunted (and eaten) by residents of Central and South American countries.

The crested caracara is known to prey on green ibis, with a pair observed chasing and attacking one in flight, driving it to the ground. They killed it by pecking it repeatedly on the head. The green ibis is the type host of a species of bird louse, Plegadiphalus cayennensis.
