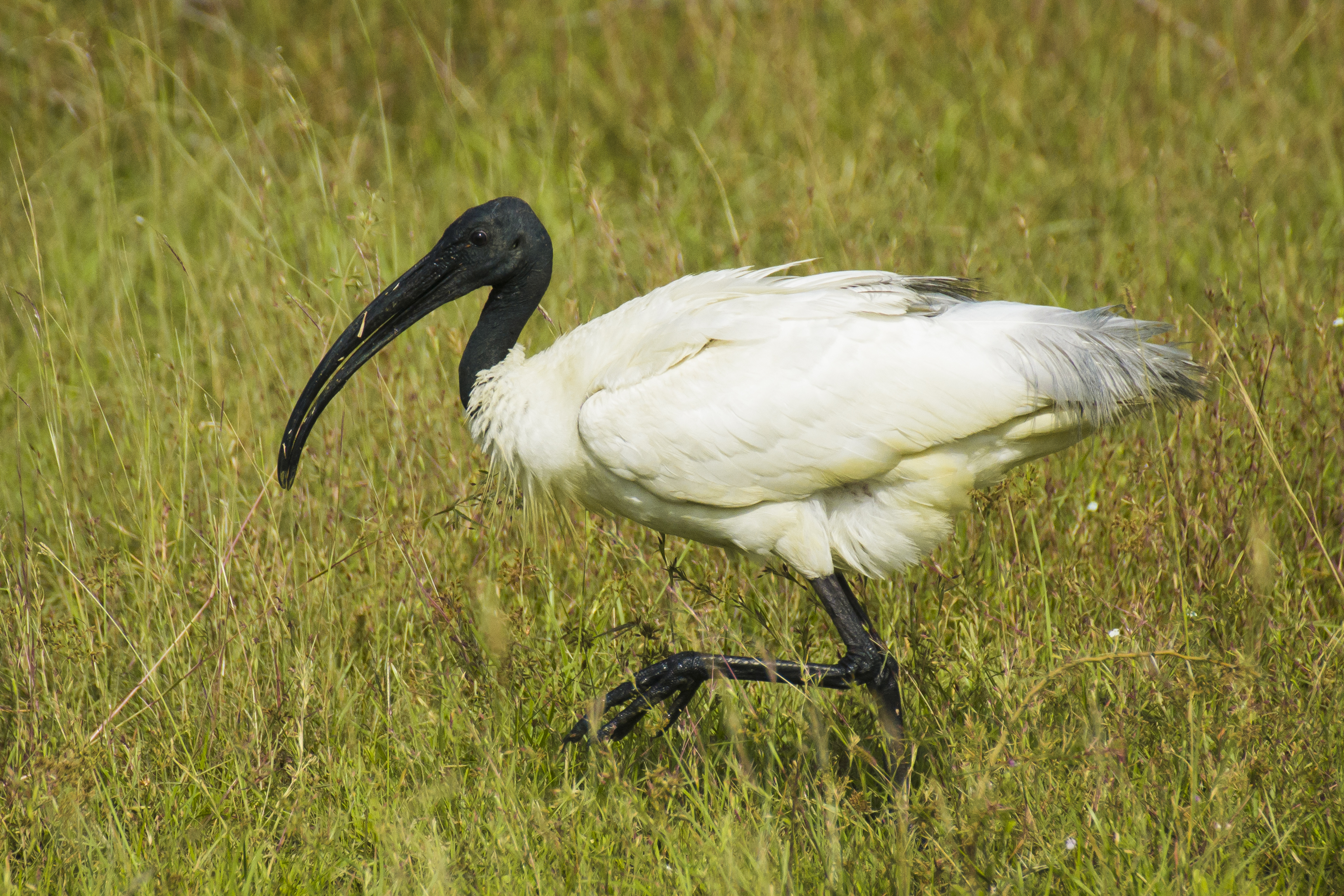
- Black-headed ibis (Threskiornis melanocephalus)

Scientific classification
- Kingdom: Animalia
- Phylum: Chordata
- Class: Aves
- Order: Pelecaniformes
- Suborder: Ardei
- Family: Threskiornithidae

Genera
- †Apteribis; Bostrychia; Cercibis; Eudocimus; Geronticus; Lophotibis; Mesembrinibis; Nipponia; Phimosus; Plegadis; Pseudibis; Theristicus; Threskiornis

Cladistically included but traditionally excluded taxa
- Platalea

= Ibis =

Long-legged wading birds with down-curved beaks

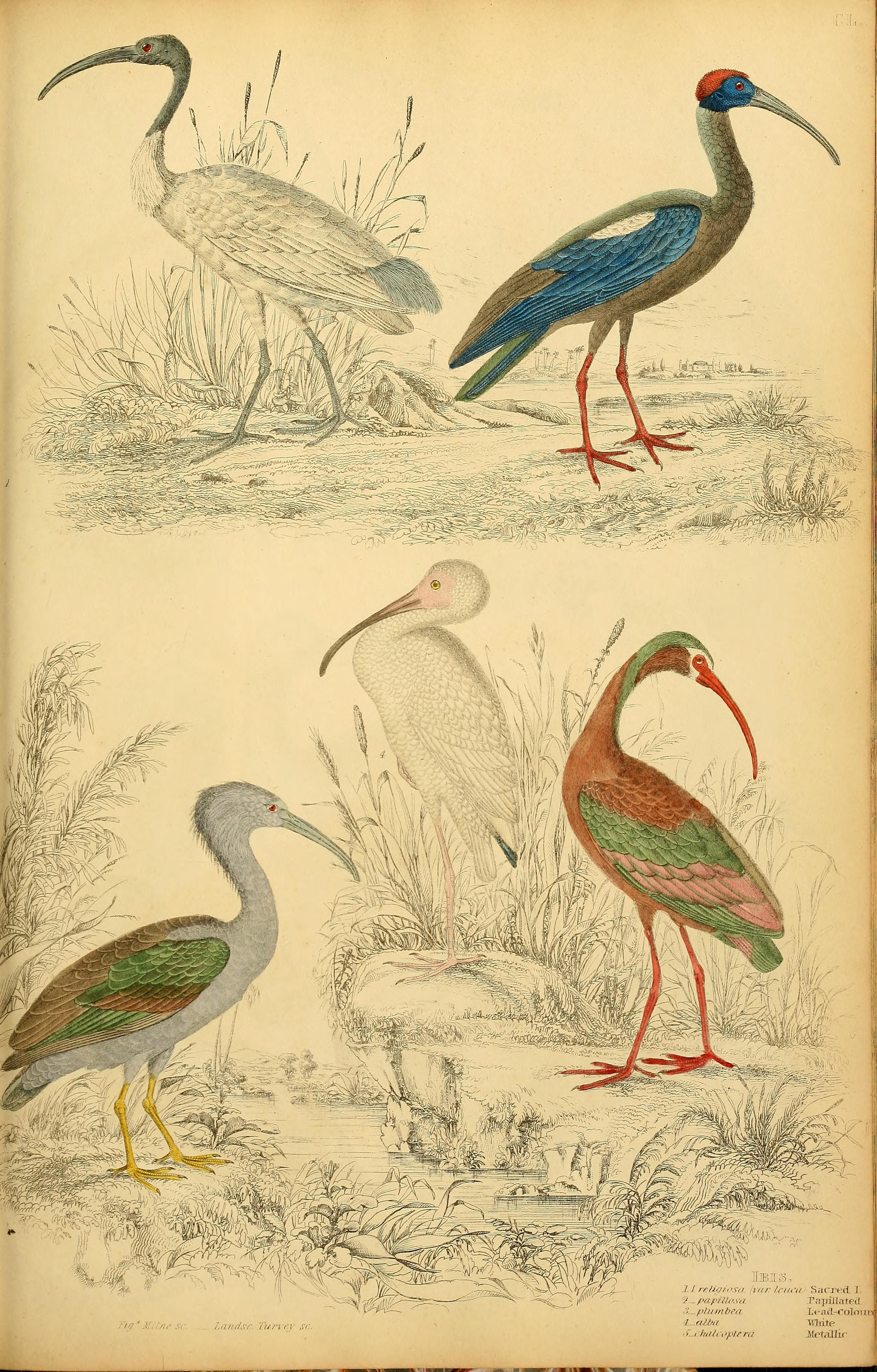
Ibises illustration, c. 1835–1840

The ibis (/ˈaɪbɪs/) (collective plural ibises; classical plurals ibides and ibes) are a group of long-legged wading birds in the family Threskiornithidae that inhabit wetlands, forests and plains. "Ibis" derives from the Latin and Ancient Greek word for this group of birds. It also occurs in the scientific name of the western cattle egret (Ardea ibis) mistakenly identified in 1757 as being the sacred ibis.

== Description ==
Ibises all have long, downcurved bills, and usually feed as a group, probing mud for food items, usually crustaceans. They are monogamous and highly territorial while nesting and feeding. Most nest in trees, often with spoonbills or herons. All extant species are capable of flight, but two extinct genera were flightless, the kiwi-like Apteribis in the Hawaiian Islands, and the peculiar Xenicibis in Jamaica. The word ibis comes from Latin ibis from Greek ἶβις ibis from Egyptian hb, hīb.

== Species in taxonomic order ==
The birds called 'ibis' do not form a monophyletic group, as the spoonbills (Platalea) are embedded within them. There are two major clades within the family Threskiornithidae, a widespread clade that includes the type genus Threskiornis, the spoonbills, and six other genera, occurring in both the Old and New Worlds, and a smaller group of entirely New World species, the first five genera listed below.

There are 29 extant species of ibis (plus six species of spoonbills), and several extinct species of ibis, including one (Réunion ibis) that became extinct in historical times.

Image	Genus	Species
	Eudocimus Wagler, 1832	Scarlet ibis, Eudocimus ruber; American white ibis, Eudocimus albus
	Theristicus Wagler, 1832	Plumbeous ibis, Theristicus caerulescens; Buff-necked ibis, Theristicus caudatus; Black-faced ibis, Theristicus melanopis; Andean ibis, Theristicus branickii
	Cercibis Wagler, 1832	Sharp-tailed ibis, Cercibis oxycerca
	Mesembrinibis J.L. Peters, 1930	Green ibis, Mesembrinibis cayennensis
	Phimosus Wagler, 1832	Bare-faced ibis, Phimosus infuscatus
	Plegadis Kaup, 1829	Glossy ibis, Plegadis falcinellus; White-faced ibis, Plegadis chihi; Puna ibis, Plegadis ridgwayi
	Lophotibis L. Reichenbach, 1853	Madagascar ibis, Lophotibis cristata
	Bostrychia G.R. Gray, 1847	Olive ibis, Bostrychia olivacea; São Tomé ibis, Bostrychia bocagei; Spot-breasted ibis, Bostrychia rara; Hadada ibis, Bostrychia hagedash; Wattled ibis, Bostrychia carunculata
	Nipponia Reichenbach, 1850	Crested ibis, Nipponia nippon
	Geronticus Wagler, 1832	Northern bald ibis, Geronticus eremita; Southern bald ibis, Geronticus calvus
	Pseudibis Hodgson, 1844	Red-naped ibis, Pseudibis papillosa; White-shouldered ibis, Pseudibis davisoni; Giant ibis, Pseudibis gigantea
	Platalea Linnaeus, 1758	Six species of spoonbills
	Threskiornis G.R. Gray, 1842	African sacred ibis, Threskiornis aethiopicus; Malagasy sacred ibis, Threskiornis bernieri; Black-headed ibis, Threskiornis melanocephalus; Australian white ibis, Threskiornis molucca; Straw-necked ibis, Threskiornis spinicollis

=== Extinct species ===
Extinct ibis species include the following:

- Apteribis. Several species of flightless ibises from Hawaii.
  - Apteribis brevis. Maui flightless ibis
  - Apteribis glenos. Molokai flightless ibis
- Xenicibis xympithecus. Discovered in Jamaica.
- Eudocimus peruvianus. Discovered in Peru.
- Theristicus wetmorei. Discovered in Peru.
- An extinct species, the Jamaican ibis or clubbed-wing ibis (Xenicibis xympithecus) was uniquely characterized by its club-like wings.
- Geronticus perplexus. Discovered in France. It is known only from a piece of distal right humerus, found at Sansan France, in Middle Miocene rocks. It appears to represent an ancient member of the Geronticus lineage, in line with the theory that most living ibis genera seem to have evolved before 15 million years ago (mya).
- Geronticus apelex. Discovered in South Africa.
- Geronticus balcanicus. Discovered in Bulgaria.
- Gerandibis pagana. Discovered in France. It is the sole species known for this genera.
- Threskiornis solitarius (Réunion ibis)

== Ecology ==
=== Habitat ===
Most ibises are freshwater wetland birds using natural marshes, ponds, lakes and riversides for foraging. Some ibis species such as the white-faced ibis, and black-headed ibis benefit from flooded and irrigated agriculture. The Andean ibis is unusual in being found in high altitude grasslands of South America. The foraging and nesting behaviour, and fluctuating numbers of the white ibis matches closely with water levels in the Everglades ecosystem leading to its selection as a potential indicator species for the system. Few ibis species such as the olive ibis and green ibis are also found in dense forests. The Llanos grasslands of Venezuela have the highest global ibis diversity with seven species sharing the marshes and grasslands. Multiple ibis species manage to use the same area by exhibiting differences in the habitats used and the prey eaten. In Indian agricultural landscapes, three ibis species manage to live together by altering the habitats they use seasonally with the Black-headed Ibises and Glossy preferring shallow wetlands throughout the year, while the endemic Red-naped Ibises preferred upland areas thereby entirely avoiding potential competitive interactions.

=== Breeding ===
Ibises breeding habits are very diverse. Many ibises such as the black-headed Ibis, scarlet ibis, glossy ibis, American white ibis and Australian white ibis breed in large colonies on trees. Nest trees are located either in large wetlands or in agricultural fields, with many species like the red-naped ibis breeding inside cities. The Australian white ibis also breeds extensively inside cities and has greatly expanded its population. The white-faced ibis sometimes nests on dry land and on low shrubs in marshes.

== In culture ==
The African sacred ibis was an object of religious veneration in ancient Egypt, particularly associated with the deity Djehuty or otherwise commonly referred to in Greek as Thoth. He is responsible for writing, mathematics, measurement, and time as well as the moon and magic. In artworks of the Late Period of Ancient Egypt, Thoth is popularly depicted as an ibis-headed man in the act of writing. However, Mitogenomic diversity in sacred ibis mummies indicates that ancient Egyptians captured the birds from the wild rather than farming them.

At the town of Hermopolis, ibises were reared specifically for sacrificial purposes, and in the Ibis Galleries at Saqqara, archaeologists found the mummies of one and a half million ibises.

According to local legend in the Birecik area, the northern bald ibis was one of the first birds that Noah released from the Ark as a symbol of fertility, and a lingering religious sentiment in Turkey helped the colonies there to survive long after the demise of the species in Europe.

The mascot of the University of Miami is an American white ibis named Sebastian. The ibis was selected as the school mascot because of its legendary bravery during hurricanes. According to legend, the ibis is the last of wildlife to take shelter before a hurricane hits and the first to reappear once the storm has passed.

Harvard University's humour magazine, Harvard Lampoon, uses the ibis as its symbol. A copper statue of an ibis is prominently displayed on the roof of the Harvard Lampoon Building at 44 Bow Street.

The short story "The Scarlet Ibis" by James Hurst uses the red bird as foreshadowing for a character's death and as the primary symbol.

The African sacred ibis is the unit symbol of the Israeli Special Forces unit known as Unit 212 or Maglan (Hebrew מגלן).

According to Josephus, Moses used the ibis to help him defeat the Ethiopians.

The Australian white ibis has become a focus of art, pop culture, and memes since rapidly adapting to city life in recent decades, and has earned the popular nicknames "bin chicken" and "tip turkey". In December 2017, the ibis placed second in Guardian Australia's inaugural Bird of the Year poll, after leading for much of the voting period.

In April 2022, Queensland sports minister Stirling Hinchliffe suggested the ibis as a potential mascot for the 2032 Olympic Games, which are scheduled to be held in Brisbane. Hinchcliffe's suggestion prompted much discussion in the media.

== Gallery ==
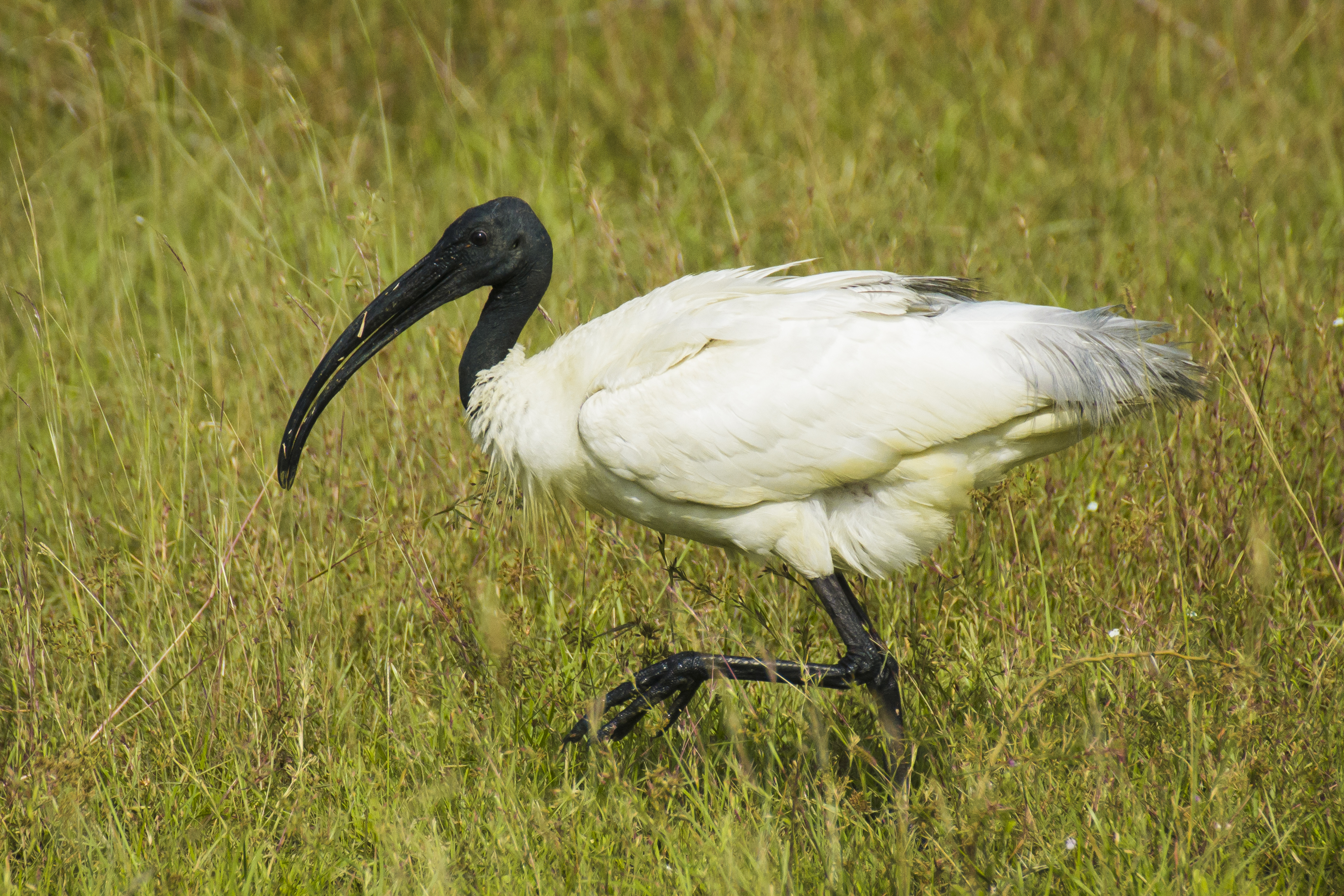
Black-headed ibis

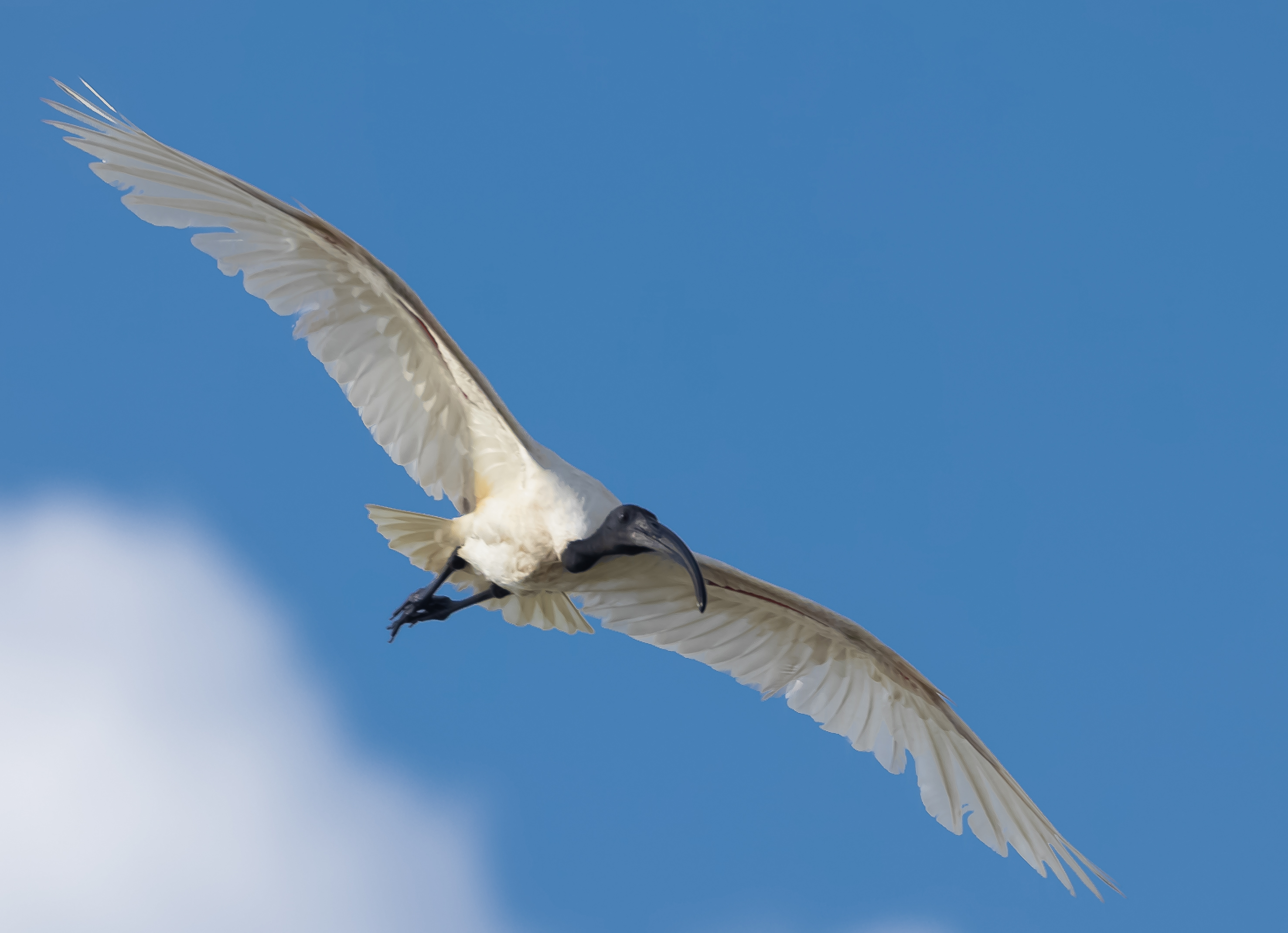
Black-headed ibis

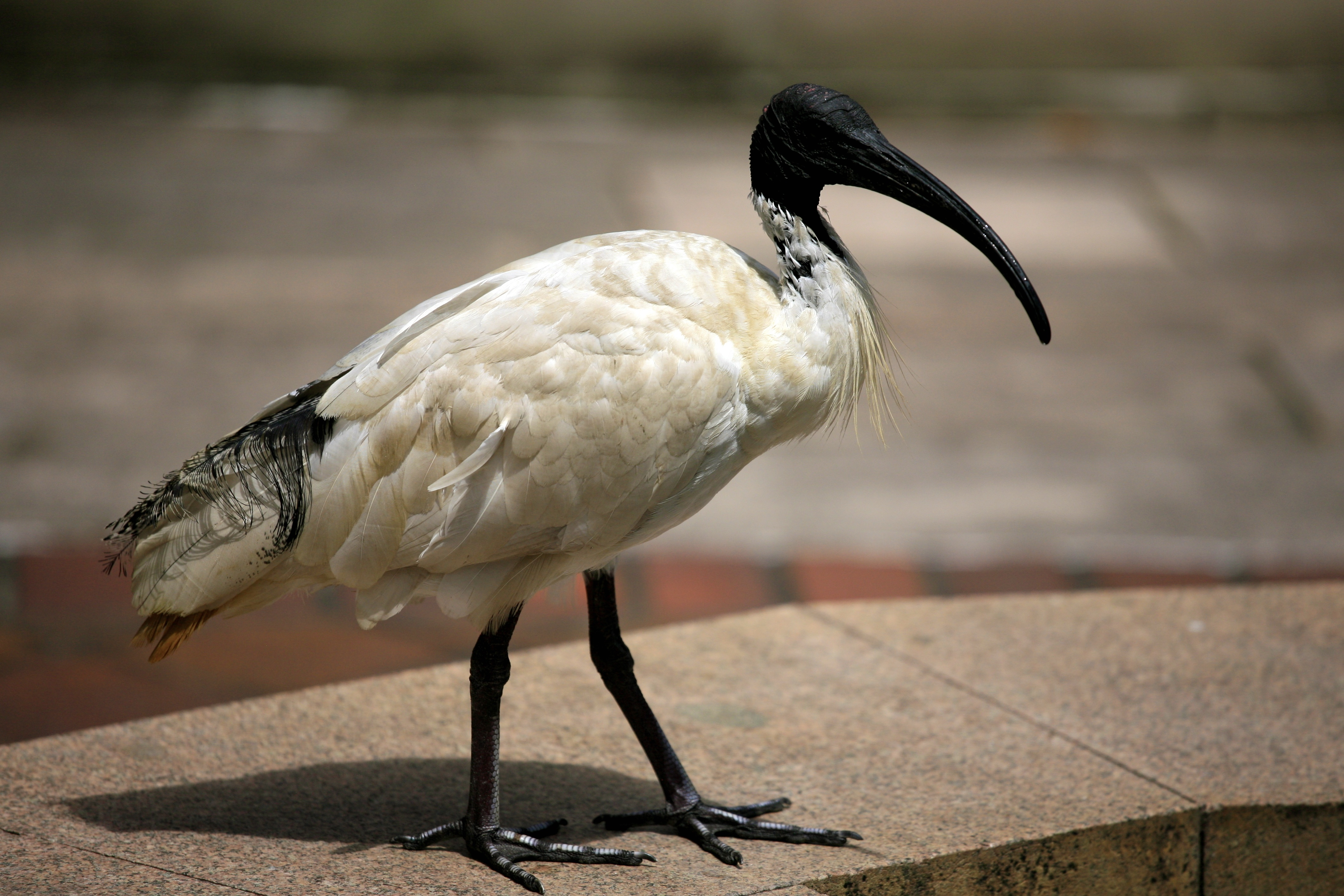
Australian white ibis

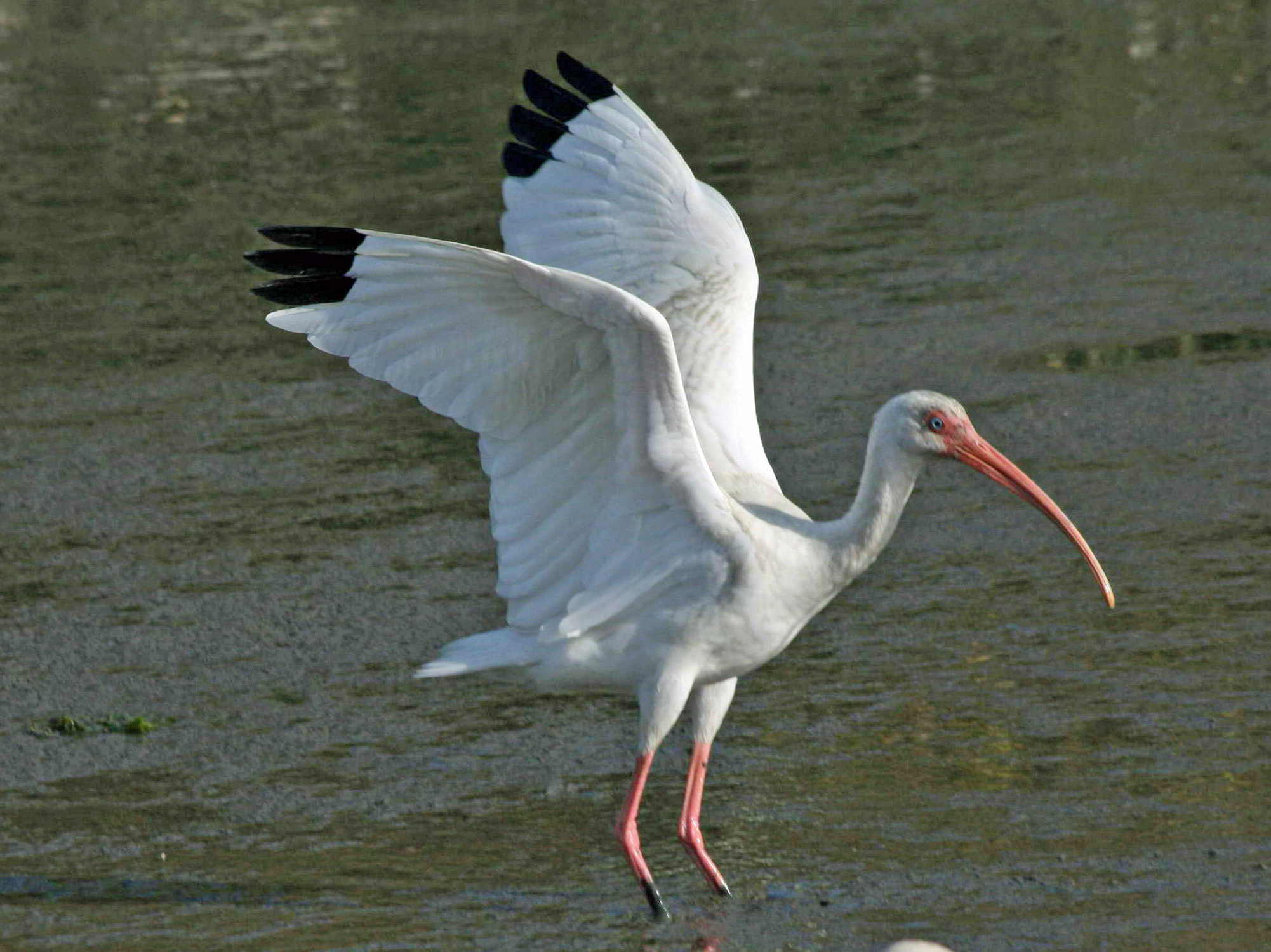
American white ibis

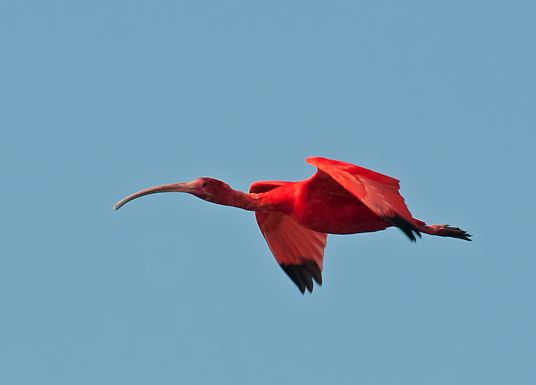
Scarlet ibis

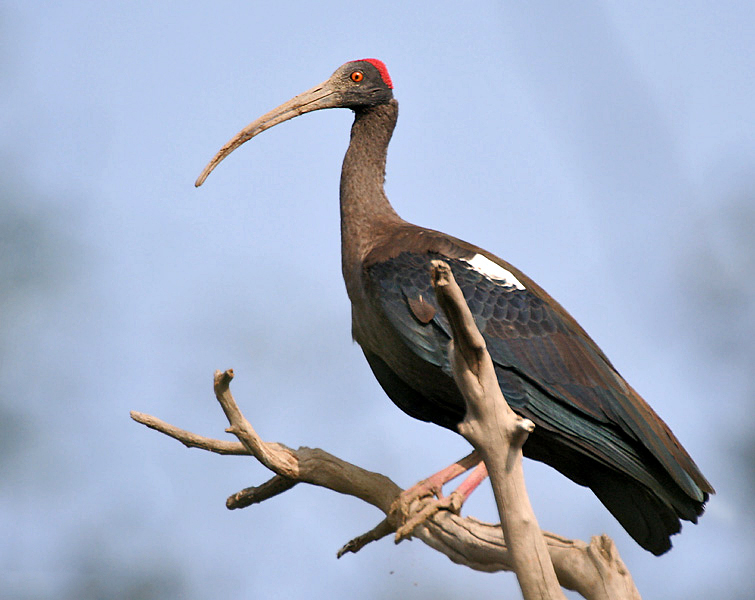
Black ibis

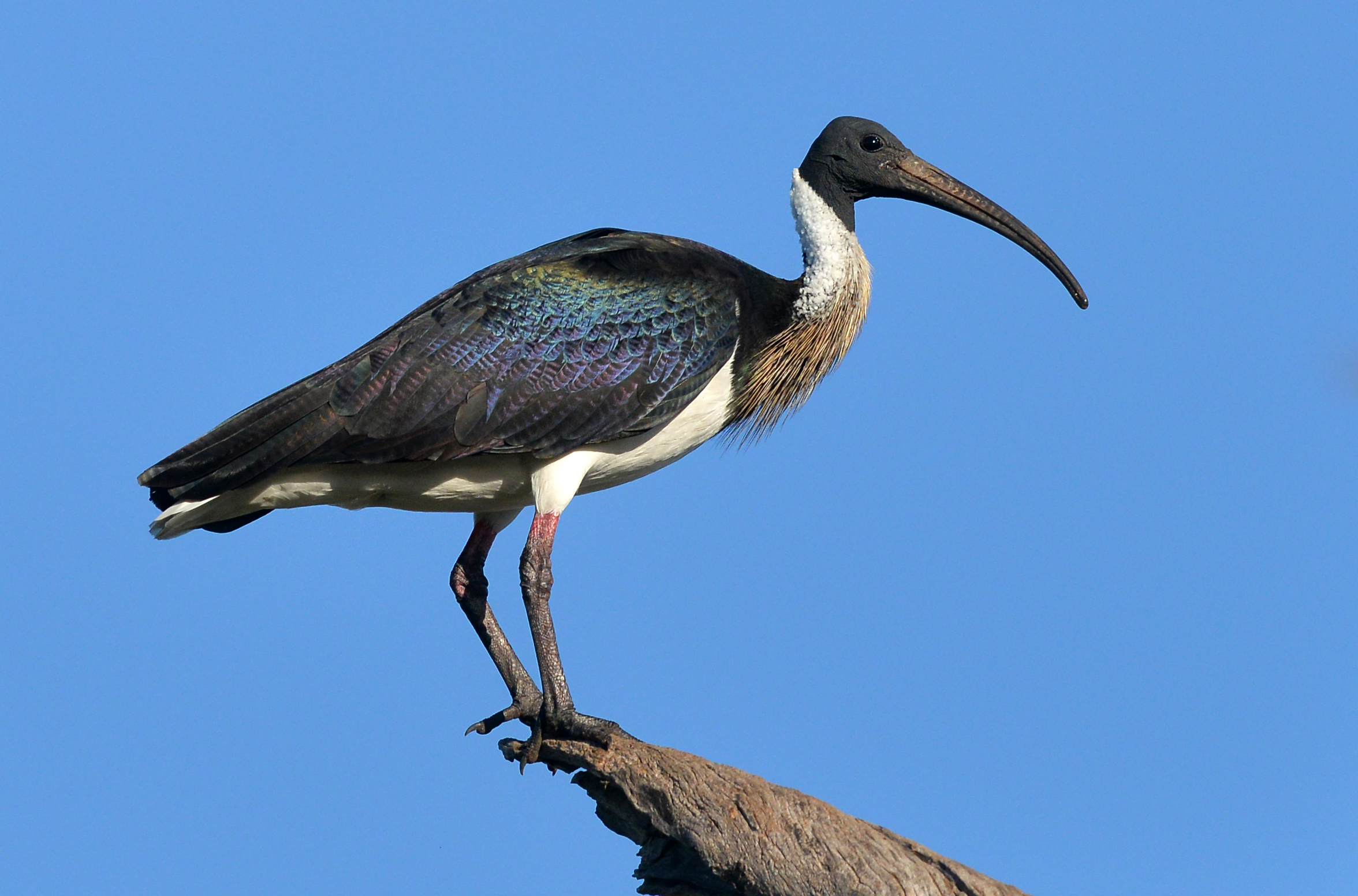
Straw-necked ibis

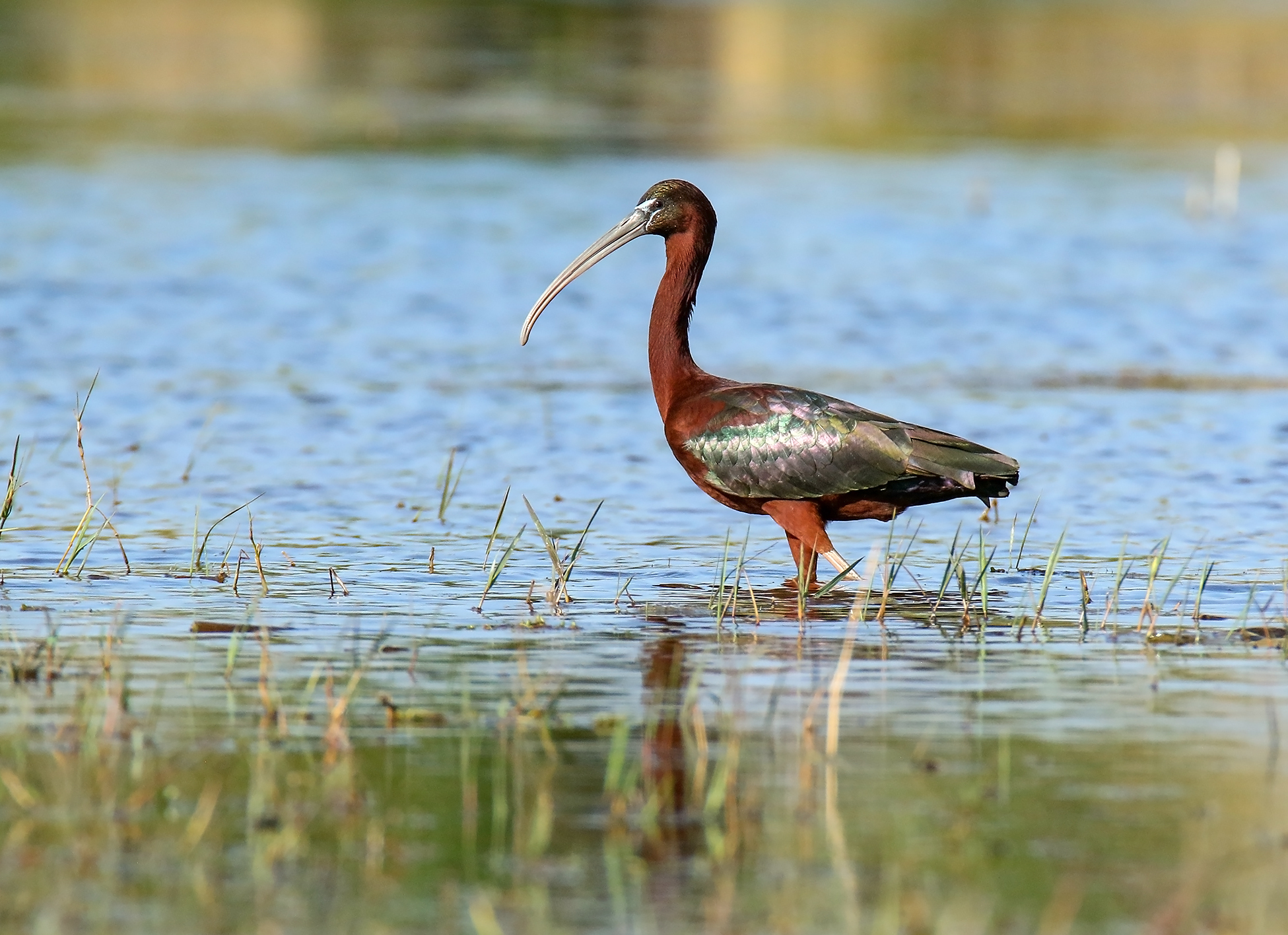
Glossy ibis

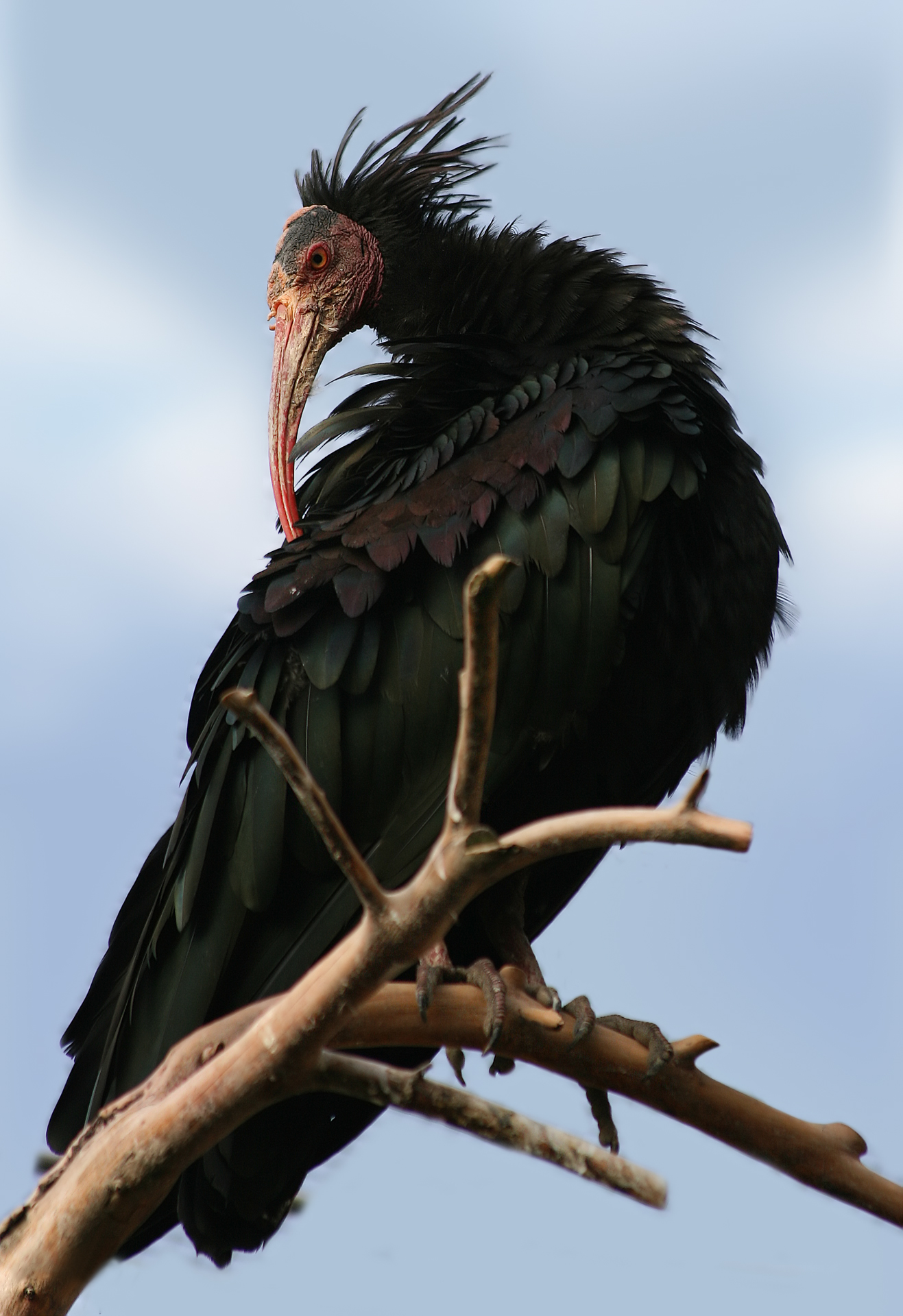
Northern bald ibis

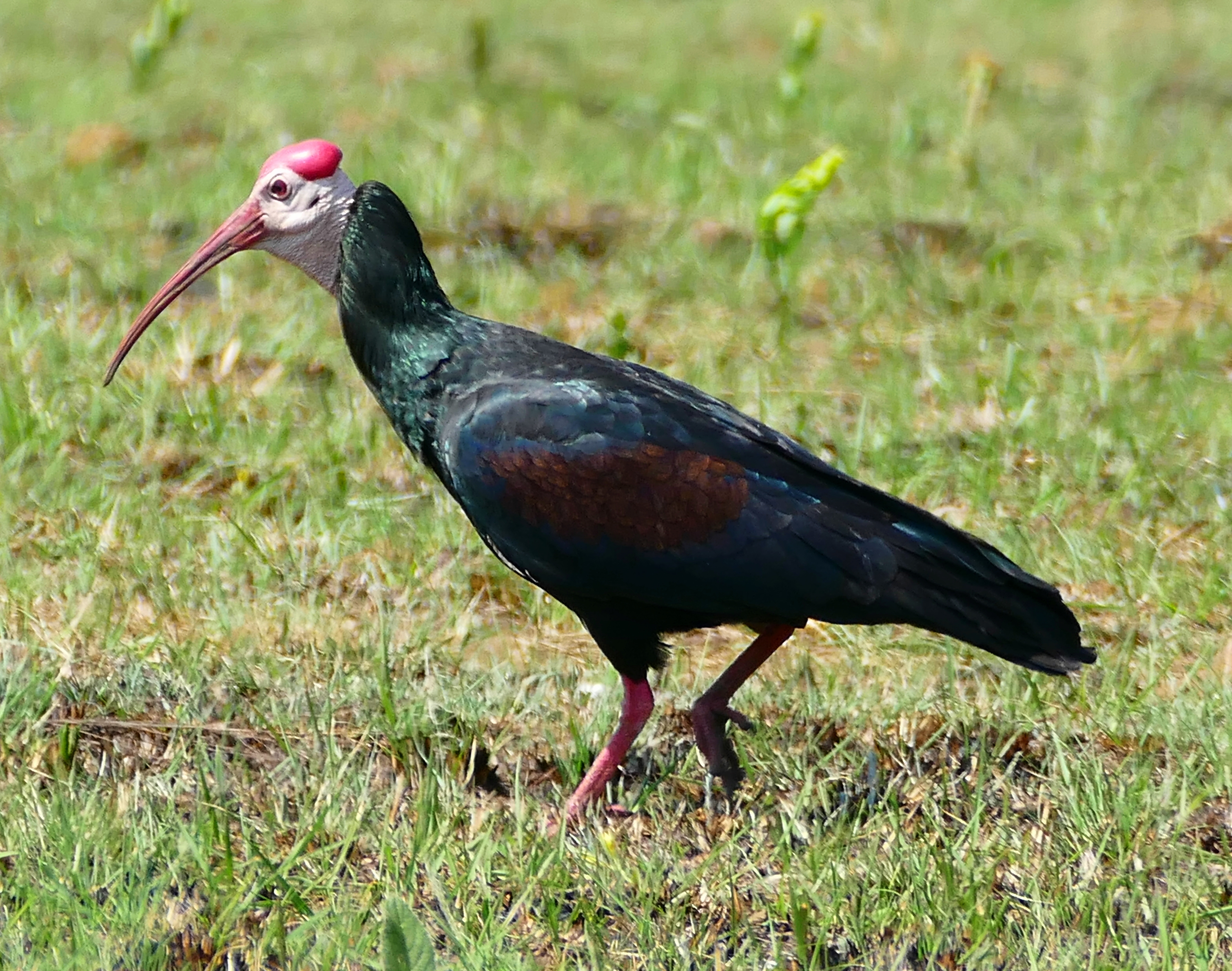
Southern bald ibis

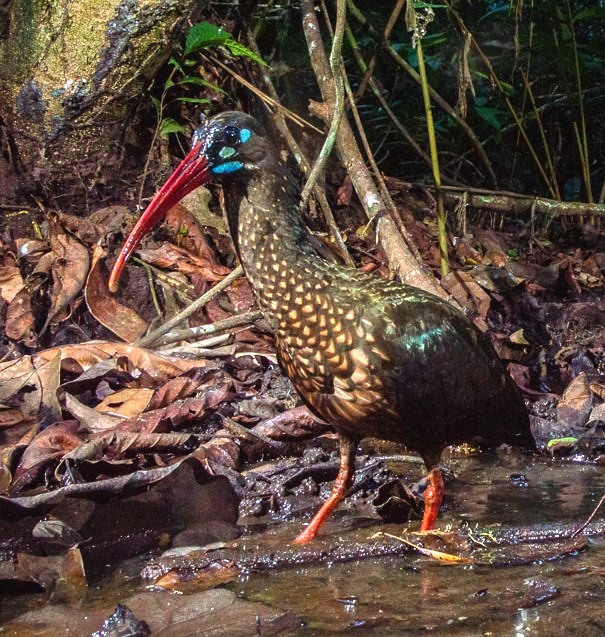
Spot-breasted ibis

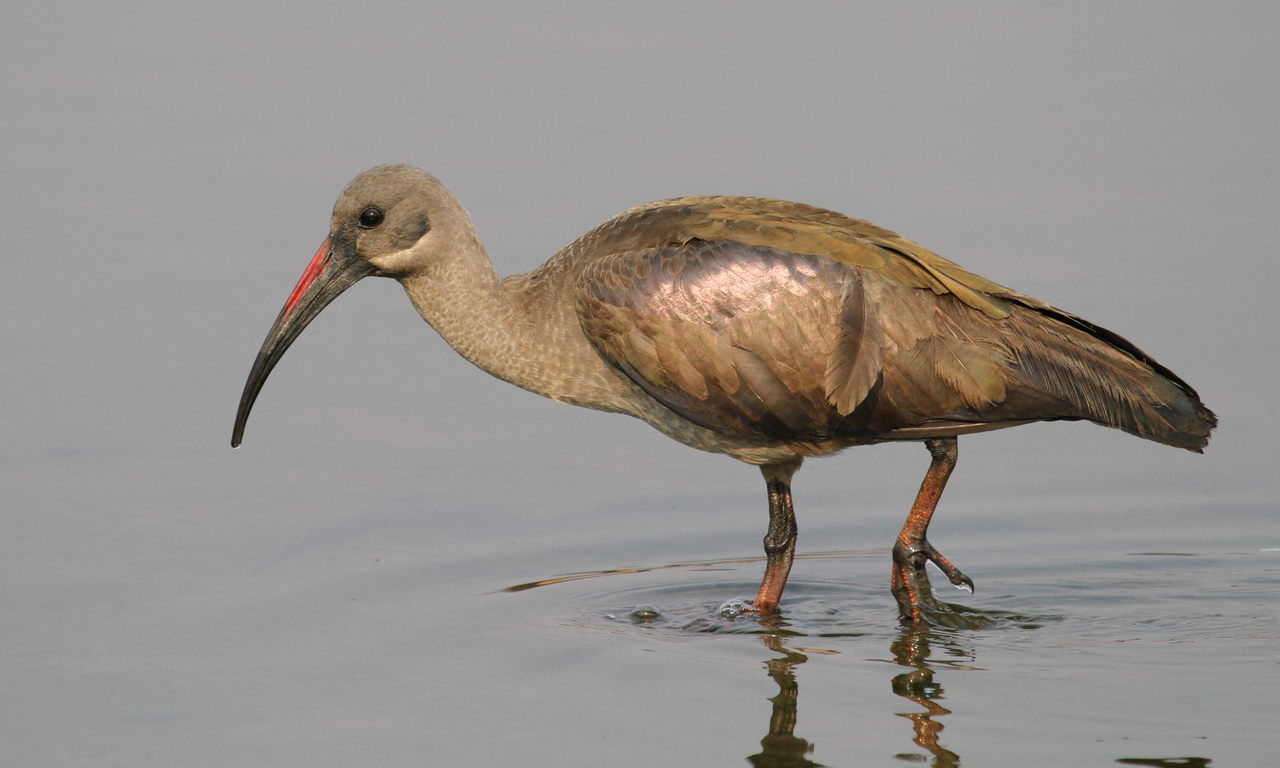
Hadada ibis

white-faced ibis in the Yolo Bypass Wildlife Area, California

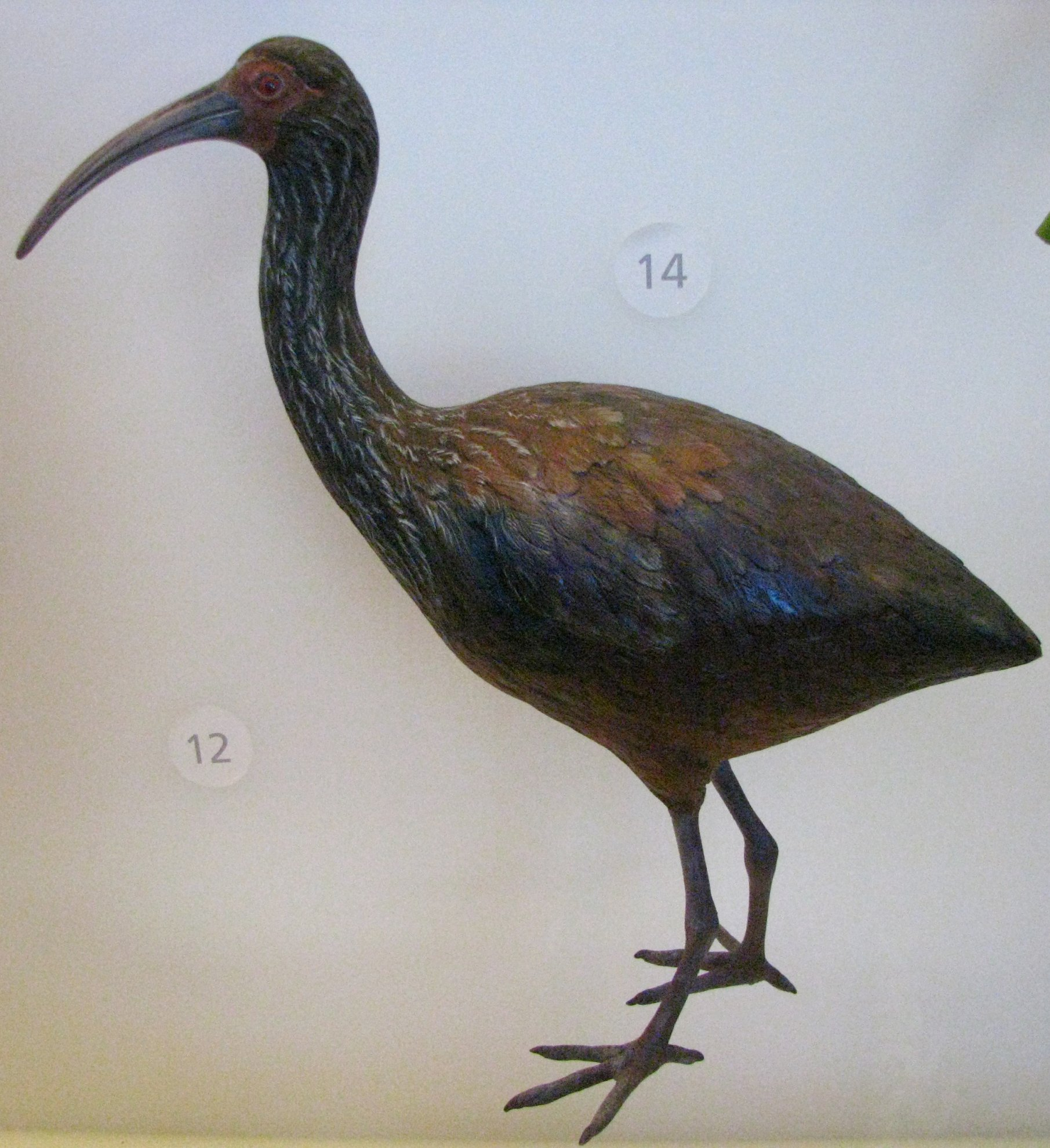
Artist's model reconstruction of a Hawaiian flightless ibis in the genus Apteribis
