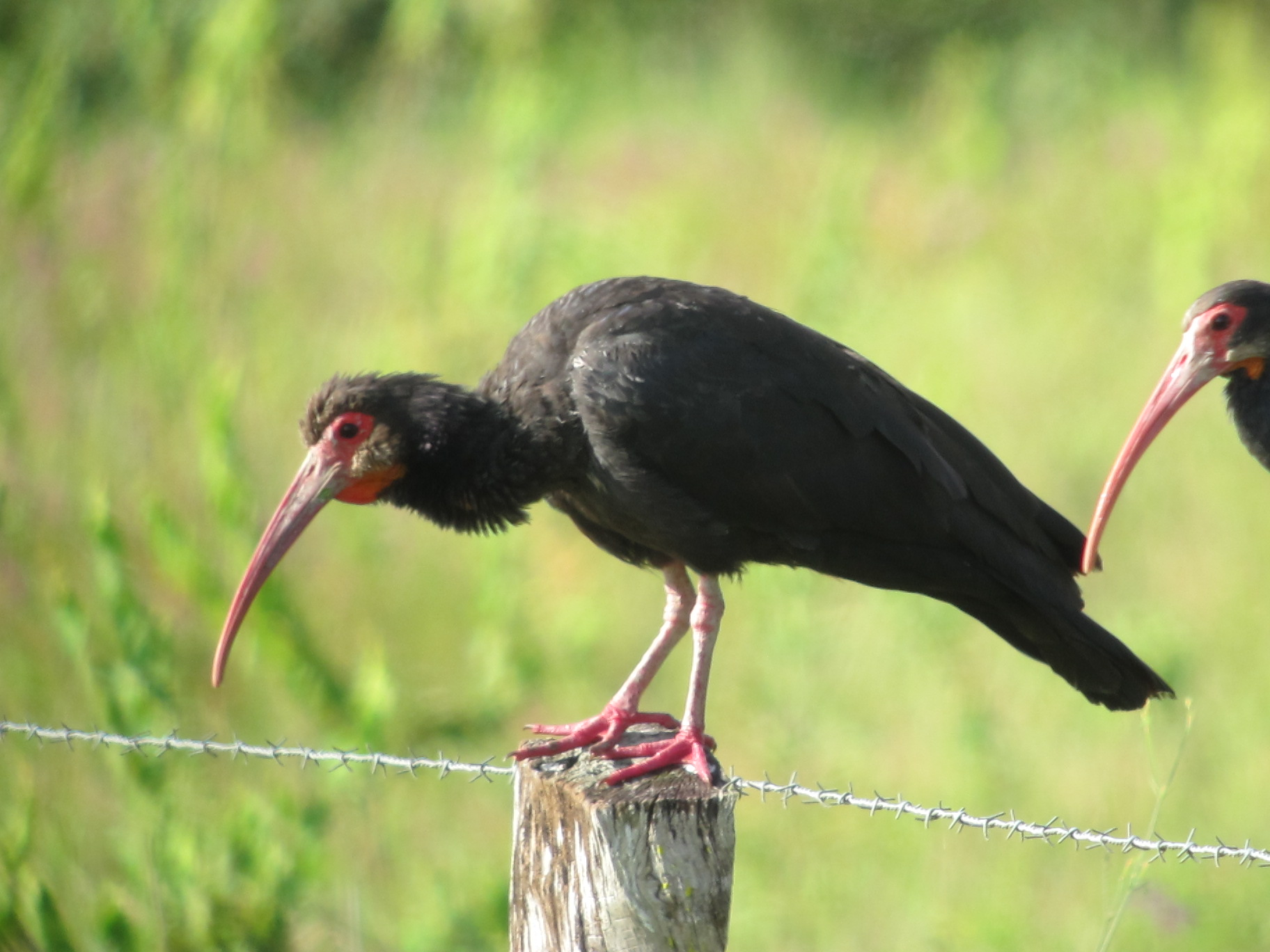

Conservation status
- Least Concern (IUCN 3.1)

Scientific classification
- Kingdom: Animalia
- Phylum: Chordata
- Class: Aves
- Order: Pelecaniformes
- Family: Threskiornithidae
- Genus: Cercibis; Wagler, 1832
- Species: C. oxycerca

Binomial name
- Cercibis oxycerca (Spix, 1825)
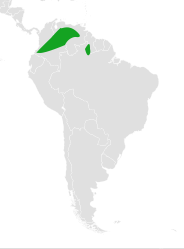
- Current world extant distribution according to the IUCN (2012)

Synonyms
- Ibis oxycercus Spix, 1825; Geronticus oxycercus (Spix, 1825)

= Sharp-tailed ibis =

Species of bird

The sharp-tailed ibis (Cercibis oxycerca) is a species of ibis native to open wet savannas in parts of northern South America.

== Taxonomy and systematics ==
The sharp-tailed ibis is monotypic, being the only representative of the genus Cercibis. Much remains unknown about this ibis's evolutionary history; however, phylogenetic analyses based on skull morphology and function suggest that it is closely related to the spoonbills.

== Description ==
This large ibis measures 75–86 cm in length, with males being slightly larger than females. In adult males, the flat wing measures 390–415mm lengthways, and the culmen measures 156–168mm from the base of the bill. In adult females, the wing is 376–413mm long and the culmen 144–197mm.

The species is distinguished by its notably long tail, the longest among all extant ibis species; measuring 250–301mm in males and 256–272mm in females. The tail projects beyond the tips of the folded wings when the ibis stands; and beyond the trailing legs in flight. The plumage is predominantly black with greenish glossing; and with purplish tinges on the upper back, hindneck, wings and tail. The forehead and cheek region are occasionally greyish brown. Juveniles appear similar to adults, but their plumage lacks a metallic sheen.

The bill, legs, toes, and bare facial skin are orangey-red; the throat is yellowish-orange, and a feathered grey strip extends below the eye from the lower mandible. An inconspicuous fuzzy crest extends down the back of its head and upper neck. The iris is greyish red, but is sometimes scarlet red, which may be associated with breeding. Nothing is however known of changes in soft part colourations as part of courtship. Overall, the sharp-tailed ibis is superficially similar to many sympatric ibises such as the glossy ibis and the bare-faced ibis; but clearly differs through its longer tail and larger body size.

This ibis is particularly vocal. The call is a loud, distinct single or double cuk or turuck; or kut and kut-kaaaoh. These calls resemble the sound of a saxophone or toy trumpet. Flight calls have been transcribed as a long drawn-out tuuut, as a cuk cuk cuk cuk and as a loud nasal TUUR-DEE. The male is believed to utter the TUUR element, and the female utters the following DEEE in response. The timbre of the TUUR-DEE call has earned it the local Spanish name Tarotaro.

The sharp-tailed ibis has a slow, laboured flight; with individuals flying low above the ground and often only covering short distances such as between neighbouring trees. However, they have been observed to fly across wide-open expanses of grassland toward roosting or feeding sites. Due to its noisy wing beating, it is often heard before coming into view.

== Distribution and habitat ==
The sharp-tailed ibis inhabits wet lowland savannas and riverbanks of northern South America east of the Andes, at less than 300-500m above sea level. It is native to Venezuela, eastern Colombia, southwestern Guyana, Brazil and Suriname. In Venezuela, it is typically found along or near the Orinoco and Apure rivers. In the llanos of eastern Colombia, it is found along the Casanare and Cravo Sur rivers, as well as the Colombian stretch of the Apure. In Brazil, it often occurs to the northwest of the Amazon and frequents the grasslands near to the Rio Negro and Rio Branco. However, it is also present to the west near Rio Guanco and to the south in northwest Mato Grosso. This ibis also sometimes uses gallery forests in which to roost and breed.

This ibis is patchily distributed throughout its global range and despite a relatively large total population; it is generally uncommon on a local scale and is considered to be the least numerous ibis species in the Venezuelan llanos. It is however more abundant there during the rainy season.

It does not associate with other wading bird species, often distancing itself from its heterospecifics. It is primarily found in male-female pairs and in small intraspecific groups comprising three to five individuals. Despite this ibis's territoriality, individuals very rarely forage alone. The two individuals of a dyad differ markedly in body size, which suggests that they constitute a paired male and female given the differences in biometrics between the sexes. The groups of more than two individuals appear to comprise a paired male and female along with their juvenile offspring. In observations of flocks of three, the individual assumed to be the offspring is notably smaller with less developed facial colourations.

== Ecology ==
=== Food and feeding ===
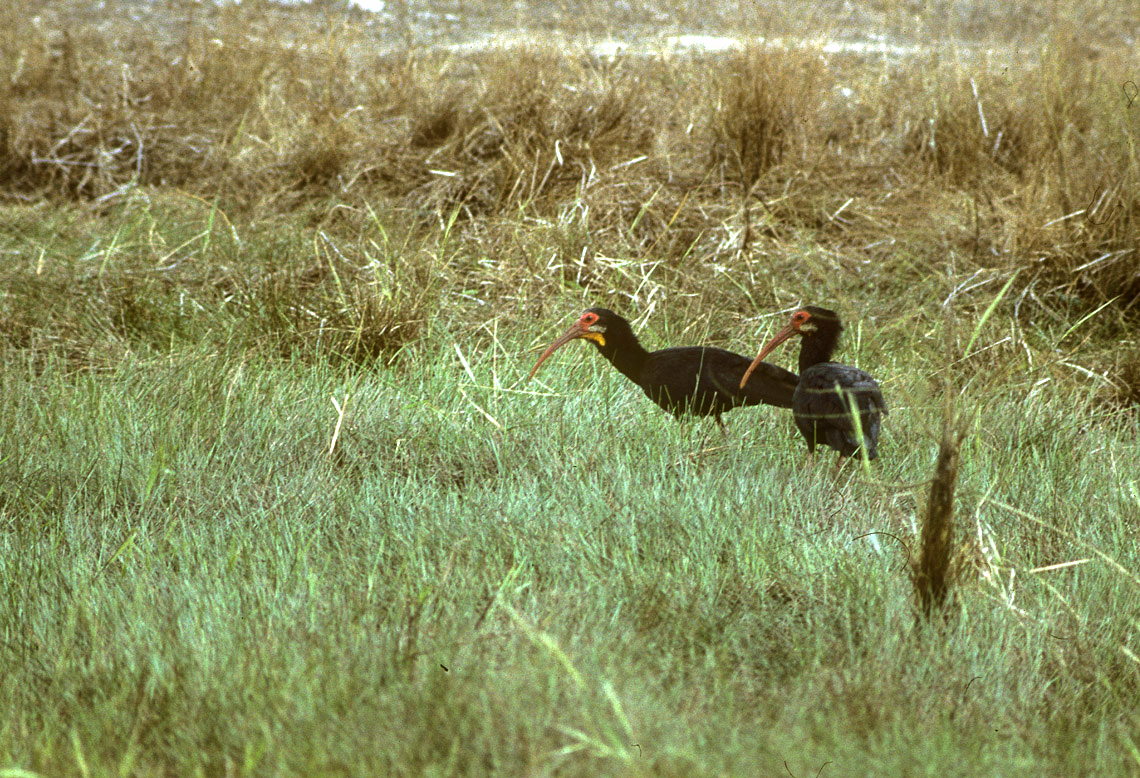
Sharp-tailed ibis foraging

Like the sympatric glossy ibis, the sharp-tailed ibis largely feeds terrestrially or semi-terrestrially; either on open land or in short grass. It typically forages in moist soil, shallow mud and along marshy edges of lagoons and rice fields. However, it also occasionally forages in shallow water at depths of 3 cm or less. It is less aquatic in its feeding habits than many other South American Ibises. Throughout the sharp-tailed ibis's range, only the buff-necked ibis forages on drier, higher-altitude ground. More rarely, the sharp-tailed ibis has been observed to forage in gallery forests during the wet season.

The species primarily feeds tactilely. Its typical foraging method consists in walking quickly over moist soil and through shallow mud or water; probing deeply into the moist underlying substrate for prey at intervals. It is relatively flexible in microhabitat use, foraging either on open ground or in short grass. Several individuals have been observed with dried mud along the length of their bills. Its foraging highly resembles that of the glossy ibis and buffnecked ibis. Despite the largely overlapping niches, the sharp-tailed ibis may be more active during the morning than other sympatric ibises; hence suggesting temporal niche partitioning. There may also be differences between these sympatric ibis species in specific dry-season probing depths and microhabitat use within the large-scale savannas.

The sharp-tailed ibis feeds primarily on medium-sized insects, especially in the dry season. It also occasionally feeds on amphibians, crustaceans, earthworms and snails. Its tendency to forage in pairs or small groups may be partly attributable to the relatively dispersed distribution of its insect prey in the llanos.

This ibis probably migrates locally during the wet season to higher altitude feeding grounds which may serve as a refuge from the extensive flooding of the lowland grassland. Its persistence as a primarily terrestrial forager in its semi-aquatic habitat suggests that its relatively dry higher-altitude feeding grounds which remain unflooded in the wet season are sufficiently extensive, or that the dry season is sufficiently long to ensure high annual prey availability in the lowlands.

=== Breeding ===
Unusually for a wading bird of the llanos, this ibis breeds in the dry season months from August until February; whereas the majority of llanos avifauna breeds in the wet season around May to October. The sharp-tailed ibis breeds solitarily in gallery forests, where egg-laying is believed to occur from August to September; and fledged offspring remain with their parents until late February. Average egg measurements have been reported as 65.9 x 44mm and the average egg weight as 70g. In a six-year wading bird survey of Masaguaral in the llanos, the sharp-tailed ibis was never seen on the lowland grasslands during the dry-season months of August and December. In one other study, it was not sighted in the months of December and January. Its secretive nesting behaviours probably explains its apparent absence from the open llanos grasslands during the breeding season.

Details of courtship in this species are largely unknown. However, preening behaviours between mates have been observed in which one individual nibbles with its bill at the base of the other's bill; which could potentially be part of courtship. Additionally, larger individuals have been observed to preen smaller individuals assumed to be their offspring, which also sometimes gently peck with their bills at the larger individuals in return.

== Threats and survival ==
One natural enemy of this ibis may be the black-collared hawk Busarellus nigricollis, one individual of which was once seen pursuing a sharp-tailed ibis over a flooded marsh. Further, the ibis flew with a rapid twisting flight which was unusual considering its normally torpid wing beating.

== Relationship to humans ==
This ibis has thus far not been kept in captivity in zoological institutions; nor has it ever been reported to have been imported to countries outside its range in South America.

== Status ==
Despite this ibis's infrequent occurrence in its savannah habitat, the population appears to have remained stable since the early 20th century; There have been no trade records of this species, and the global population is not considered to be threatened generally. The world population has been estimated at 10,000–25,000 individuals, with 6700-17000 of these being mature. The sharp-tailed ibis has been evaluated by the IUCN as Least Concern since 2004 because this bird does not approach Vulnerable under the population trend and range size criteria. Nevertheless, this species could potentially decline unnoticed due to its solitary lifestyle and hence the potential difficulty in detecting individuals during population monitoring. Further information on its basic biology and ecology is required to safeguard it against appreciable future population declines.
