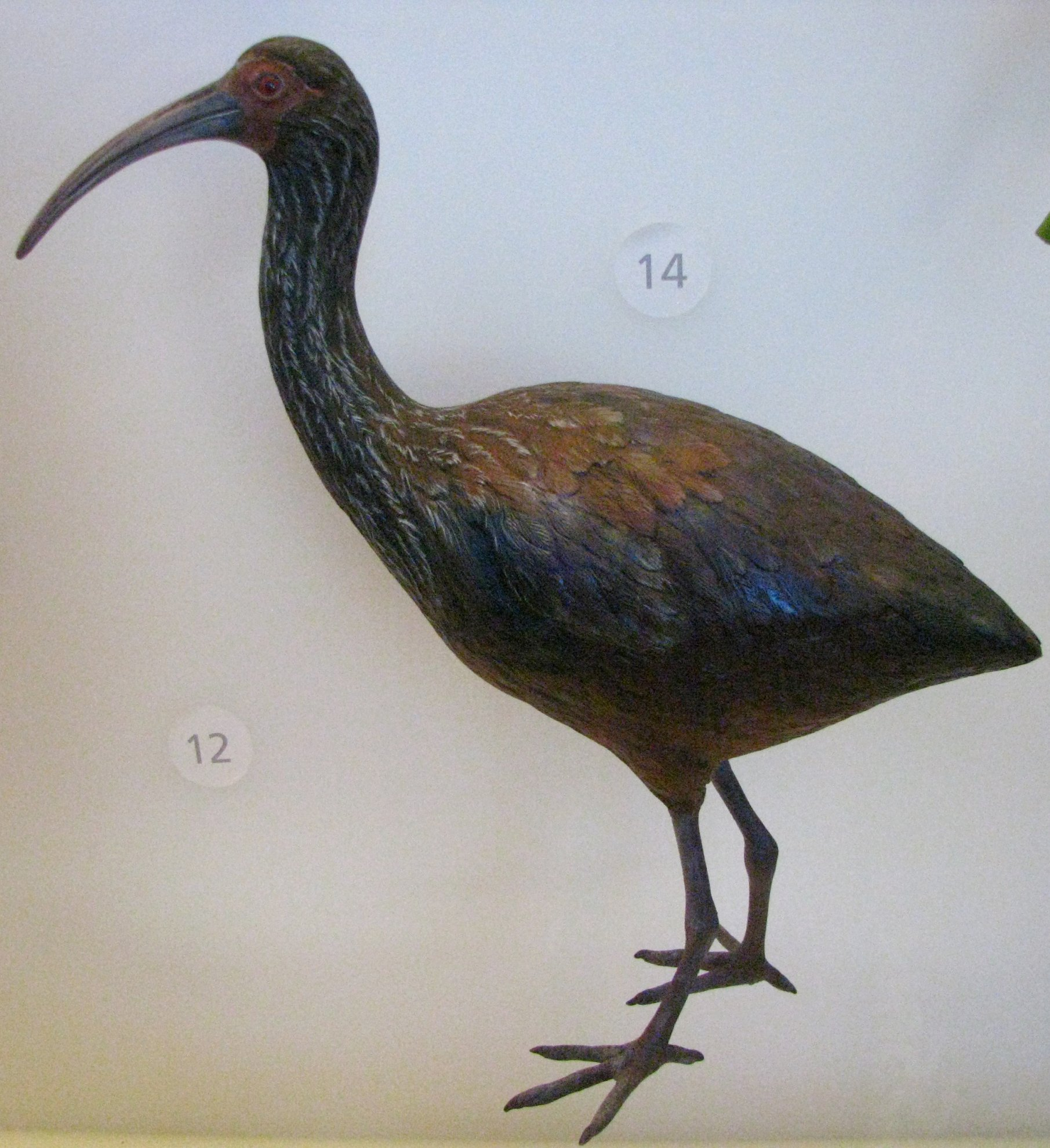

Scientific classification
- Kingdom: Animalia
- Phylum: Chordata
- Class: Aves
- Order: Pelecaniformes
- Family: Threskiornithidae
- Subfamily: Threskiornithinae
- Genus: †Apteribis; Olson & Wetmore, 1976

Species
- See text

= Apteribis =

Apteribis Temporal range: Late Quaternary

Extinct genus of birds

Apteribis is an extinct genus of flightless birds in the ibis subfamily that was endemic to the Hawaiian Islands in the Pacific Ocean.

== Distribution ==
The remains of the small ibises in the genus have only been found on the islands of Maui, Lanai, and Molokai, which formed part of the prehistoric island of Maui Nui until about 200,000 years ago when rising sea levels fragmented it. Olson and James speculate that the genus was endemic to Maui Nui, that the ibises were birds of the forest floor, that because of their flightlessness they were susceptible to becoming trapped in lava tubes, and that they may have exerted heavy predation pressure on Maui Nui's land snails.

== Taxonomy ==
Analysis of the feathers from the Lanai specimen show an affinity to New World ibises of the genus Eudocimus. The analyses also concluded that Apteribis may have had a brown-and-beige coloration similar to that of a juvenile Eudocimus ibis. This indicates that Apteribis may have evolved both their flightlessness and their coloration through a form of paedomorphosis.

== Palaeobiology ==
=== Vision and nocturnality ===
A 2026 comparative anatomical study of fossil skulls found that Apteribis had a markedly reduced visual system compared with extant ibises. Using three-dimensional reconstructions of endocranial casts and comparisons with 25 living ibis species, researchers determined that the orbital cavities, optic nerve impressions, and optic tectum regions were significantly reduced.

The reduced development of these visual structures suggests that Apteribis had limited visual capacity and was likely nocturnal, a condition not known in other ibises. The genus is inferred to have relied primarily on tactile cues detected through its elongated bill to locate prey, such as land snails and flightless crickets. The evolution of nocturnality in Apteribis has been interpreted as an adaptation to the predator-free environment of prehistoric Hawaii and to the availability of nocturnal invertebrate prey.

== Species ==
Two species have been described:

- †A. glenos Olson & Wetmore, 1976, the Moloka'i flightless ibis
- †A. brevis Olson & James, 1991, the Maui flightless ibis

The holotype of A. glenos is from the Moʻomomi dunes, and other specimens are from Ilio Point and Kalaupapa peninsula.

Fossil material collected on Maui indicates that a third species apparently occurred there; it was generally larger in size and occurred at lower elevations than A. brevis, and has been referred to as the “Maui lowland apteribis”. Another, extremely well-preserved specimen has also been recovered from Lanai, though it has not yet been described to the species level.
