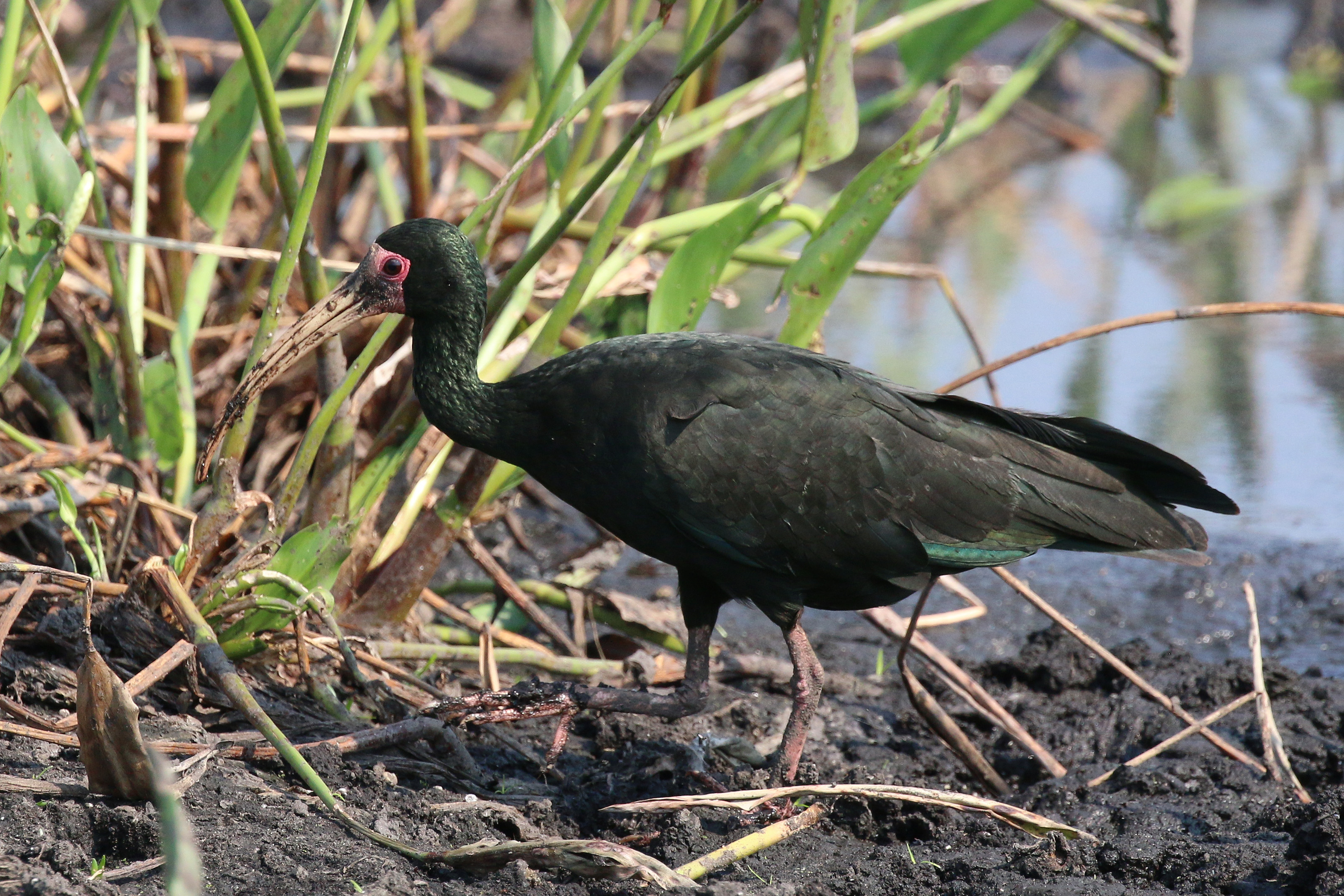
- P. i. nudifrons Pantanal, Brazil

Conservation status
- Least Concern (IUCN 3.1)

Scientific classification
- Kingdom: Animalia
- Phylum: Chordata
- Class: Aves
- Order: Pelecaniformes
- Family: Threskiornithidae
- Genus: Phimosus; Wagler, 1832
- Species: P. infuscatus

Binomial name
- Phimosus infuscatus (Lichtenstein, MHC, 1823)

= Bare-faced ibis =

Species of bird

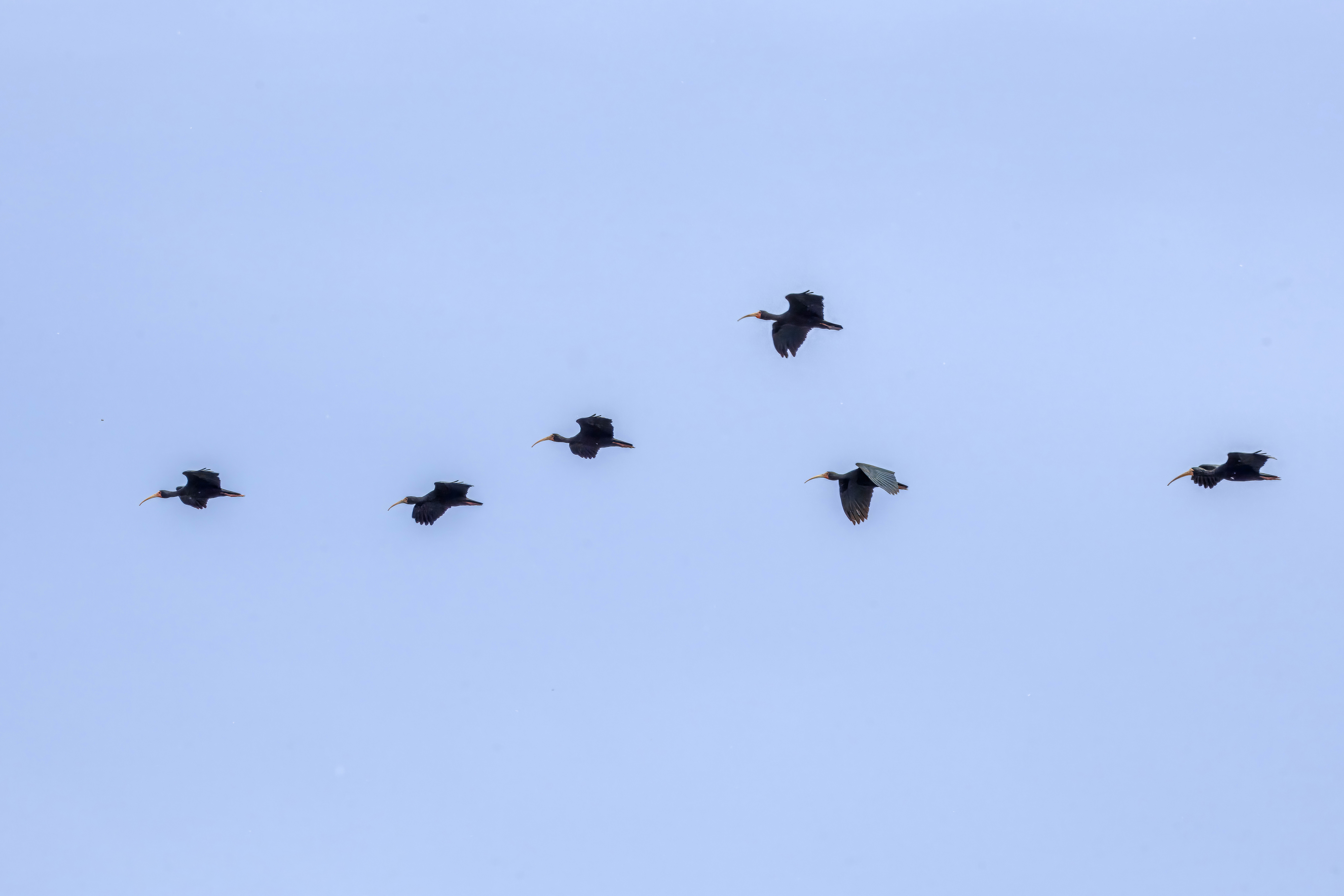
flock in Argentina

The bare-faced ibis (Phimosus infuscatus), also known as the whispering ibis, is a species of bird in the family Threskiornithidae, in the monotypic genus Phimosus.

== Distribution ==
It is found in Argentina, Bolivia, Brazil, Colombia, Ecuador, Guyana, Paraguay, Suriname, Uruguay, and Venezuela.

== Description ==
The bare-faced ibis is either dark brown or a blackish color. It is called the bare-faced ibis because it does not have any feathers on its face. It has a long decurved bill with a pinkish to reddish brown colour. The skin on its face is usually a reddish color, and it also has long orange colored beak with pink legs. The total length of the ibis ranges between 45 and 50 cm.

== Food ==
The bare-faced ibis forages in most soil and along the edges of standing water. Its diet consists of insects, worms, clams, and other small invertebrates.

== Habitat ==
The bare-faced ibis occurs in open areas such as wet meadows, savannas, marshes, and rice fields. The ibis is usually near sea level but was recorded in Venezuela and Colombia.

== Behavior ==
Bare-faced ibises are usually seen in large flocks of their own species or with other species of ibis, sometimes even found with domestic animals. They live in close range neighboring amongst other flocks of ibis, typically known for the closest living habitats that range from being 100 meters away from the nearest neighbor. They are not very territorial towards other ibis birds, and are rarely found alone, but most of the time their aggression is limited to food robbery from another ibis or animal. Regarding nesting behavior, it is less aggressive when compared to other species of ibis. The males have a larger bill than the females relative to their body sizes, and sexual selection is not as intense as it is in other species. They share nests with other species as well.

== Reproduction ==
They usually breed in small colonies amongst their own species and the breeding usually ranges from August to December. Their nest are found in trees or shrubs, and they build platforms. They lay anywhere from 1–8 eggs, the eggs are lightly colored between green and blue and the incubation is 21–23 days and both the male and female perform it.
