= List of birds of Chennai =

This is a lists the birds of Chennai, the capital city of the Indian state of Tamil Nadu. Over 130 species of birds have been spotted there. The list includes the local Tamil name.

Table of contents

Non-passerines: Grebes • Cormorants • Darters • Bitterns, herons and egrets • Storks • Ibises and spoonbills • Flamingos and pelicans • Ducks • Hawks, kites and eagles • Falcons • Pheasants and partridges • Rails, crakes, and coots • Jacanas • Plovers and lapwings • Sandpipers and allies • Snipes and curlew • Gulls • Terns • Sandgrouses • Doves and pigeons • Parrots and parakeets • Cuckoos • Barn owls • Typical owls • Nightjars • Swifts • Kingfishers • Bee-eaters • Rollers and hoopoe • Barbets • Woodpeckers

Passerines: Pitta and larks • Swallows and martins • Wagtails and pipits • Cuckooshrikes • Bulbuls • Thrushes and allies • Prinias • Cisticolas • Acrocephalid warblers • Old World warblers • Old World flycatchers • Laughingthrushes • Sunbirds • Old World orioles • Shrikes • Woodshrikes • Drongos • Woodswallows • Crows and treepies • Starlings • Weavers • Munias • Sparrows

== Grebes ==
- Little grebe, mukkulippan

== Cormorants ==
- Little cormorant, chinna neer kagam

== Darters ==
- Darter, pambu thara

== Bitterns, herons and egrets ==
- Grey heron, sambal narai
- Purple heron, sen narai
- Indian pond heron, kuruttu kokku
- Cattle egret, unni kokku
- Striated heron, dhosi kokku
- Great egret, peria kokku
- Black bittern, karunkurugu
- Little egret, chinna kokku
- Chestnut bittern, sengurugu
- Yellow bittern, manal naarai
- Intermediate egret, vellai kokku
- Black-crowned night heron, erakokku or vakkaa

== Storks ==
- Painted stork, manjal mooku naarai or sanguvalai naarai
- Asian open-billed stork, nathai kuthi naarai

== Ibises and spoonbills ==
- Glossy ibis, arival mookan or anril
- Black-headed ibis, vellai arival mookkan or thaalaikothi chondan

== Flamingos and pelicans ==
- Greater flamingo, poo narai
- Spot-billed pelican

== Ducks ==
- Northern pintail, maarkaliyan
- Indian spot-billed duck, pulli mookku vathu
- Lesser whistling duck, cheezhkai siragi or chilli thaaraa

== Hawks, kites and eagles ==
- Shikra, valluru
- Eurasian sparrowhawk, kuruvi valluru
- Besra, chinna valluru
- Black-winged kite, siria karum parundhu or karuntholl parundhu
- Brahminy kite, semparundhu or garudan
- Black kite, kalla parundhu
- Egyptian vulture, manjal thirudi kazhugu
- Crested honey buzzard, thaen parundhu
- Crested serpent eagle, paambu parundhu
- White-bellied sea eagle
- White-rumped vulture
- Short-toed snake eagle
- Booted eagle at Pallikaranai wetland

== Falcons ==
- Common kestrel, sivappu valluru

== Pheasants and partridges ==
- Grey francolin, kowdhari
- Indian peafowl, neela mayil
- White-breasted waterhen, kaanang kozhi

== Rails, crakes and coots ==
- Common coot, naamak kozhi
- Common moorhen, thaazhai kozhi
- Grey-headed swamphen, neela thazhai kozhi or neerk kozhi

== Jacanas ==
- Pheasant-tailed jacana, neela vaal ilai kozhi
- Bronze-winged jacana

== Plovers and lapwings ==
- Kentish plover, chinna kottan
- Little ringed plover, pattani uppukkothi or sinna kottan
- Pacific golden plover, kalporukki uppukkothi or uppukkothi
- Red-wattled lapwing, sivappu mookku aalkatti
- Yellow-wattled lapwing, manjhal mookku aalkatti

== Sandpipers and allies ==
- Common sandpiper, ullan or kottan
- Little stint, kosu ullan
- Black-tailed godwit, karuvaal mukkan
- Ruff, pedhai ullan
- Wood sandpiper, pori ullan or vayal ullaan
- Common greenshank, pachai kaali or periya kottaan
- Marsh sandpiper, chinna pachai kaali
- Common redshank, pavazha kaali or sigappukkaal ullan

== Snipes and curlew ==
- Common snipe, visirivaal ullan or korai kuthi
- Eurasian curlew, peria kottan or kuthiraimalai kottan
- Black-winged stilt, pavazhakkaal ullaan
- Stone curlew, kankiledi or kannadi aalkaatti

== Gulls ==
- Black-headed gull, kadal kaakkai

== Terns ==
- Gull-billed tern, parutha alagu aala or kadal kuruvi
- river tern, aatru aala

== Doves and pigeons ==
- Blue rock pigeon, mada pura
- Spotted dove, pulli pura or mani pura
- Little brown dove, chinna thavittu pura

== Parrots and parakeets ==
- Rose-ringed parakeet, senthaar pynkili or kili

== Cuckoos ==
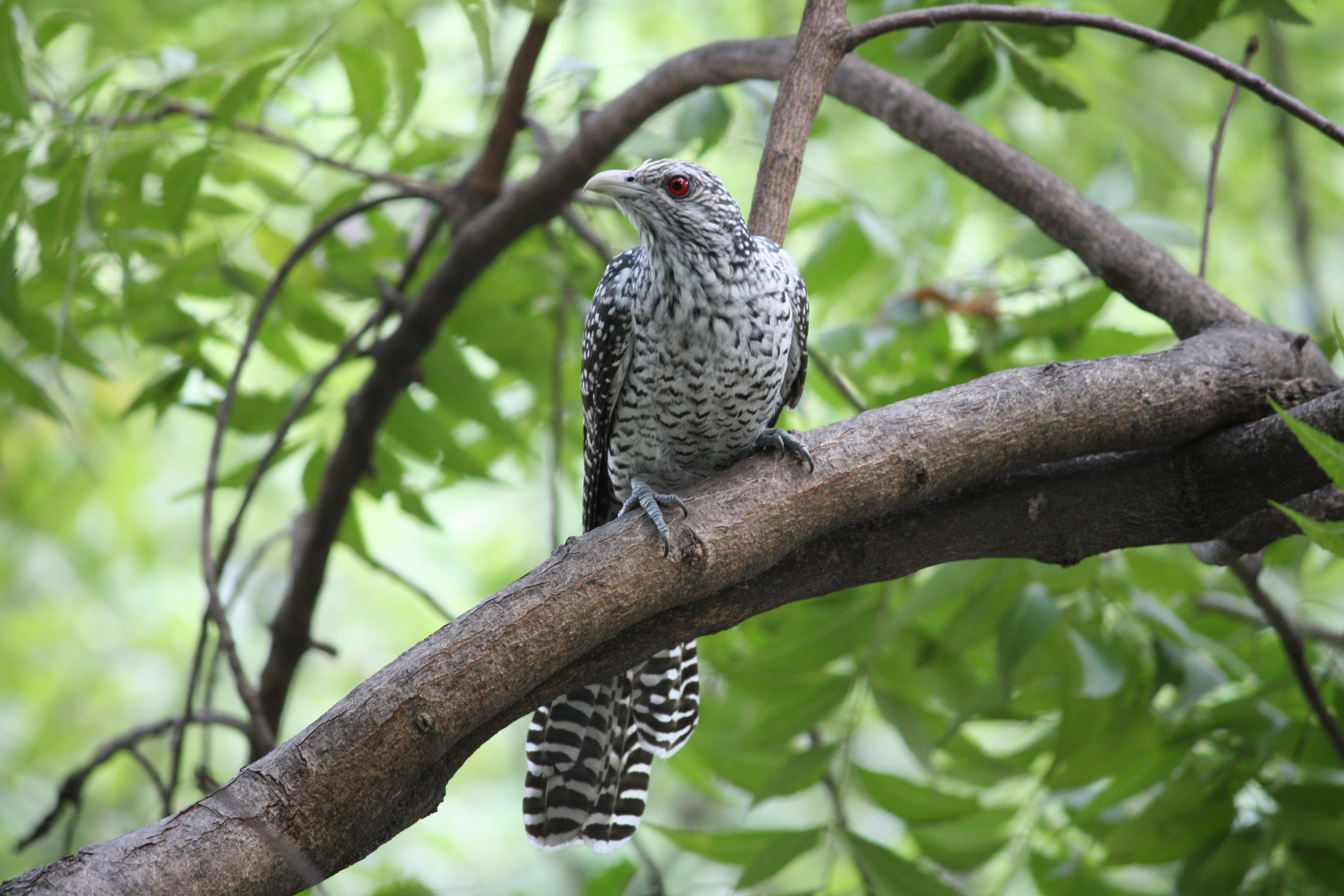
Female Asian koel in Chennai

- Greater coucal, shenbagam or kalli kaakka
- Red-winged crested cuckoo, sevviragu kondai kuyil or kondai kuyil
- Jacobin cuckoo, sudalai kuyil or paruthi kuyil
- Asian koel, kokilam or kuyil
- Brainfever bird, akka kuyil parundhu kuyil
- Blue-faced malkoha, pachai vayan kuyil

== Barn owls ==
- Barn owl, koogai andhai or saavu kuruvi

== Typical owls ==
- Short-eared owl, kuttai kaadhu aandhai or aandhai
- Spotted owlet, pulli aandhai
- Eurasian eagle owl, komban aandhai

== Nightjars ==
- Indian nightjar, chinna pakki or pakki

== Swifts ==
- House swift, nattu uzhavaran
- Asian palm swift, panai uzhavaran or uzhavaarakkuruvi

== Kingfishers ==
- Small blue kingfisher, siraal meenkothi
- Pied kingfisher, karuppu vellai meenkothi
- Stork-billed kingfisher, peria alagu meenkothi
- Black-capped kingfisher, karunthalai meenkothi
- White-throated kingfisher, venthondai meenkothi

== Bee-eaters ==
- Green bee-eater, pachai panchuruttan or panchuruttan
- Blue-tailed bee-eater, neelawal panchuruttan

== Rollers and hoopoe ==
- Indian roller, panangadai
- Hoopoe, kondalathi

== Barbets ==
- Coppersmith barbet, semmaarbu kukkuruvaan or kalutharuppan

== Woodpeckers ==
- Lesser golden-backed woodpecker, ponmudhugu maram kothi

== Pitta and larks ==
- Indian pitta, thottakkallan or arumani kuruvi
- Oriental skylark, chinna vaanambadi
- Ashy-crowned sparrow lark, sambalthalai vaanambadi
- Jerdon's bushlark, pudhar vaanambadi

== Swallows and martins ==
- Barn swallow, thagaivilaan or thaampaadi

== Wagtails and pipits ==
- Paddyfield pipit, pullu porukki
- Grey wagtail, kodikkaal vaalatti
- yellow wagtail, manjal vaalatti
- White-browed wagtail, kulathu kuruvi

== Cuckooshrikes ==
- Black-headed cuckooshrike, karunthalai kuyil keechaan
- Small minivet, chinna minchittu

== Bulbuls ==
- Red-vented bulbul, kondai kuruvi
- Red-whiskered bulbul, thondai koluthi
- White-browed bulbul, manjal thondaikuruvi
- Common iora, maambazha kuruvi

== Thrushes and allies ==
- Orange-headed thrush, senthalai poonkuruvi

== Prinias ==
- Plain prinia, thinu kuruvi
- Ashy prinia, saambal kadhirkuruvi

== Cisticolas ==
- Common tailorbird, thaiyal chittu

== Acrocephalid warblers ==
- Blyth's reed warbler, kadhirkuruvi

== Old World warblers ==
- Yellow-billed babbler, thavittu kuruvi

== Old World flycatchers ==
- Indian robin, vannaathi kuruvi
- Oriental magpie robin, vannathi kuruvi
- Indian paradise flycatcher, vethi vaalkuruvi
- Pied bushchat, pudhar chittu

== Laughingthrushes ==
- Common babbler, thavittu chilamban
- Large grey babbler, periya saambal silamban
- Jungle babbler, kaattu silamban

== Sunbirds ==
- Purple sunbird, thaen chittu
- Loten's sunbird
- Purple-rumped sunbird

== Old World orioles ==
- Indian golden oriole, maangkuyil
- Black-naped oriole

== Shrikes ==
- Brown shrike, pazhuppu keechaan
- Long-tailed shrike, kattukuruvi or pey kuruvi

== Woodshrikes ==
- Common woodshrike, kattu keechaan

== Drongos ==
- Black drongo, karichchaan

== Woodswallows ==
- Ashy woodswallow, madam puraa

== Crows and treepies ==
- Jungle crow, andan kakkai or karun kakkai
- House crow, kakkai
- Rufous treepie, vaal kakkai

== Starlings ==
- Common myna, naahanavaai
- Brahminy starling, pappathi naahanavai
- Rosy starling, chola kuruvi
- Indian pied myna

== Weavers ==
- Streaked weaver, Karungeetru Thookkanam kuruvi
- Baya weaver, Thookanaan kuruvi

== Munias ==
- Tricoloured munia, thinaikuruvi
- Scaly-breasted munia, nellu kuruvi
- White-rumped munia, venmudhugu chillai

== Sparrows ==
- House sparrow, oor kuruvi
- Indian silverbill, nellu kuruvi
