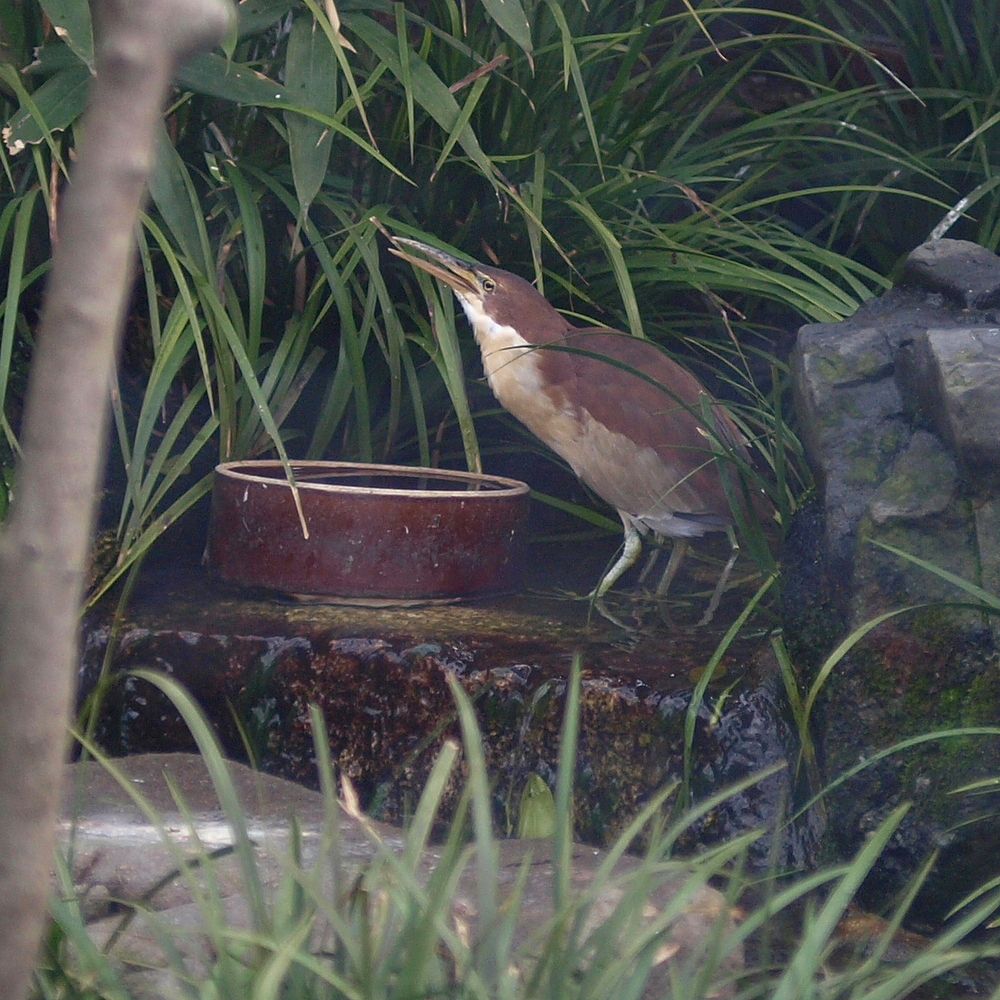

Conservation status
- Near Threatened (IUCN 3.1)

Scientific classification
- Kingdom: Animalia
- Phylum: Chordata
- Class: Aves
- Order: Pelecaniformes
- Family: Ardeidae
- Genus: Botaurus
- Species: B. eurhythmus

Binomial name
- Botaurus eurhythmus (R. Swinhoe, 1873)
- Range of B. eurhythmus Breeding range Nonbreeding range

= Von Schrenck's bittern =

Species of bird

Von Schrenck's bittern or Schrenck's bittern (Botaurus eurhythmus) is a small bittern named after Leopold von Schrenck, the 19th-century Russian zoologist. It breeds in southeast Siberia, east China, the Korean Peninsula and Japan. It winters from the Malay Peninsula to the Greater Sunda Islands, Sulawesi and the Philippines. This species was formerly placed in the genus Ixobrychus.

== Taxonomy ==
Von Schrenck's bittern was formally described in 1873 by the English naturalist Robert Swinhoe under the binomial name Ardetta eurhythma. He designated the type locality as the Amor (Xiamen) and Shanghai regions of China. Swinhoe realised that the species had been illustrated in a book by the Russian zoologist Leopold von Schrenck published in 1858. Von Schrenck had encountered the bird in the Amur river basin of eastern Russia and had believed it was a cinnamon bittern. Von Schrenck's bittern was formerly placed in the genus Ixobrychus. A molecular phylogenetic study of the heron family Ardeidae published in 2023 found that Ixobrychus was paraphyletic. To create monophyletic genera, Ixobrychus was merged into the genus Botaurus that had been introduced in 1819 by the English naturalist James Francis Stephens. The genus name Botaurus is Medieval Latin for a bittern. The specific epithet eurhythmus is from Ancient Greek eurhuthmos meaning "graceful" or "well-proportioned". The species is treated as monotypic: no subspecies are recognised.

== Description ==
The male is uniformly chestnut above, and buff below and on the wing covert feathers. The female and juvenile are chestnut all over with white speckles above, and white streaks below. When in flight, it shows black flight feathers and tail. It is a small species at 33 to 39 cm (13 to 15 in) in length, with a short neck, longish yellow beak and yellow legs.

== Distribution and habitat ==
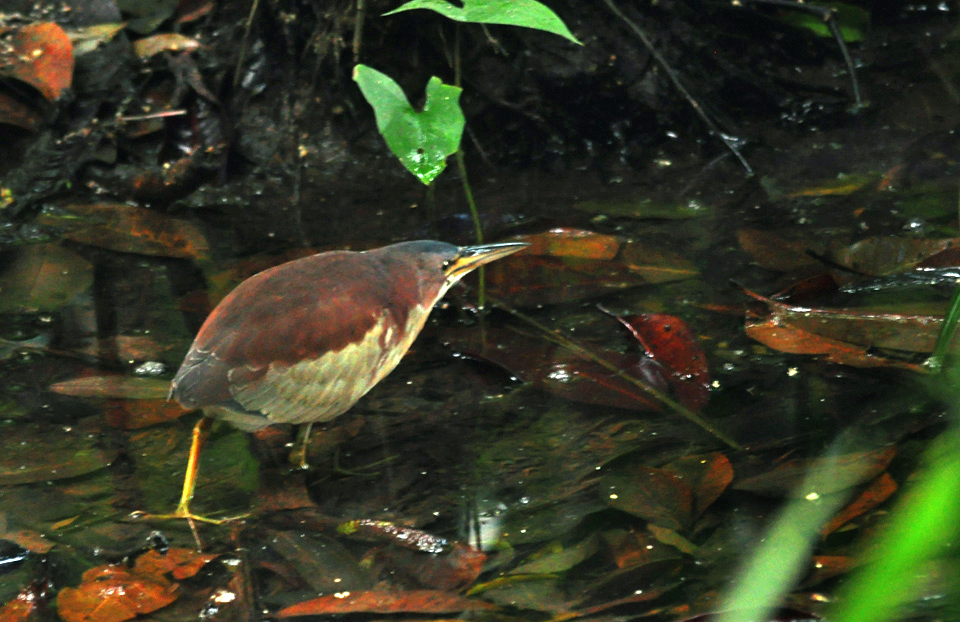
Foraging Von Schrenck's bittern in Central Catchment, Singapore

It breeds in China and Siberia from March to July, and Japan from May to August. It winters in Indonesia, the Philippines, Singapore, Laos, passing through the rest of Southeast Asia. It is an exceptionally rare vagrant as far west as Europe, with a single sighting in Italy in 1912.

== Behaviour and ecology ==
Von Schrenck's bittern breeds in reed beds and tends to emerge at dusk to forage for prey.

== Conservation ==
A secretive and hard to find species, Schrenck's bittern has an estimated population of 2,500 – 25,000 mature individuals as of 2025, which is believed to be decreasing. Because of this relatively small and declining population, it is listed as Near Threatened on the IUCN Red List.
