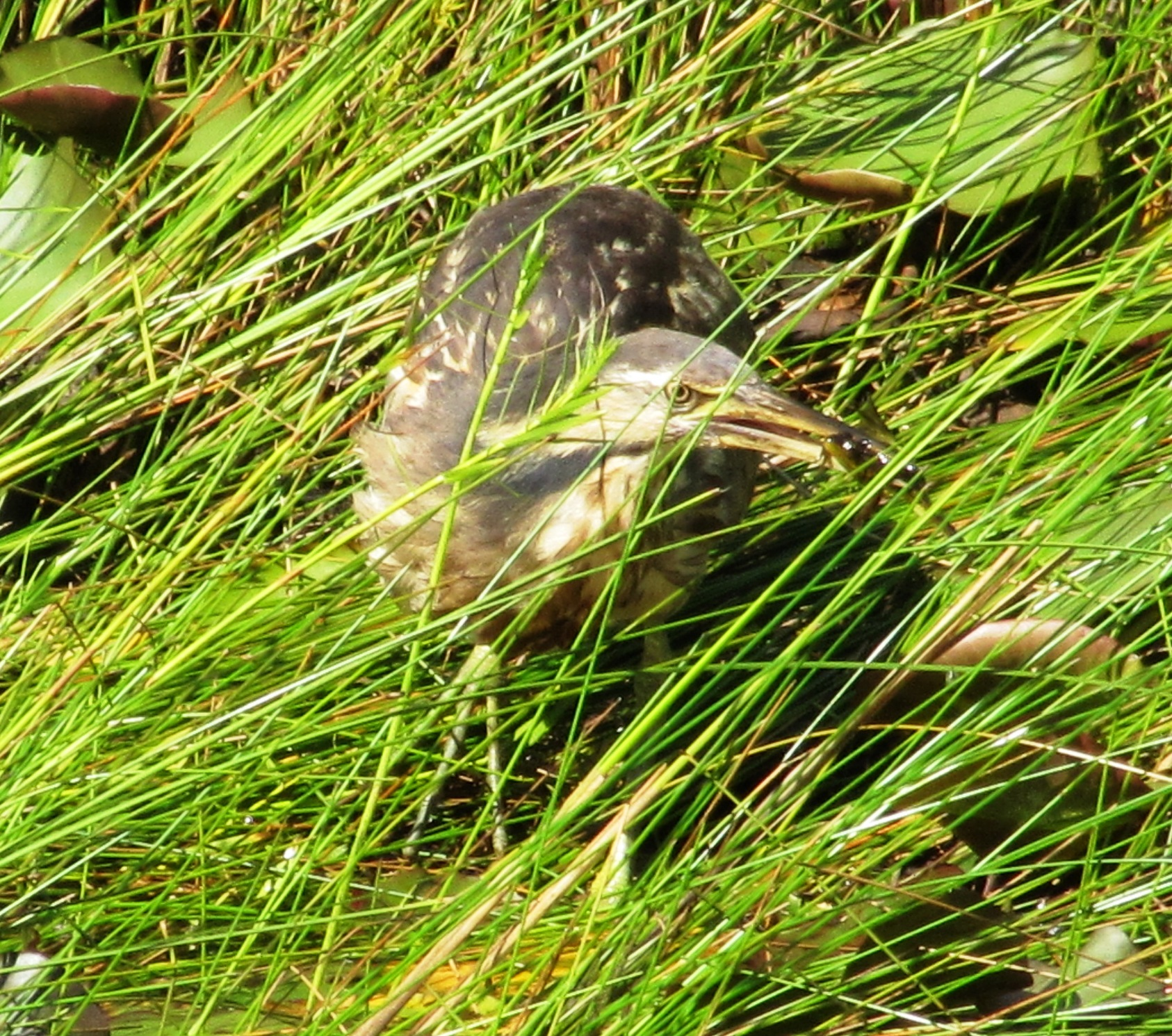
- American bittern

Scientific classification
- Kingdom: Animalia
- Phylum: Chordata
- Class: Aves
- Order: Pelecaniformes
- Family: Ardeidae
- Subfamily: Botaurinae; Reichenbach, 1850

Genera
- Botaurus Stephens, 1819; Zebrilus Bonaparte, 1855

= Bittern =

Bitterns

Subfamily of birds

Bitterns are birds belonging to the subfamily Botaurinae of the heron family Ardeidae. Bitterns tend to be shorter-necked and more secretive than other members of the family. They were called hæferblæte and various iterations of raredumla in Old English; the word "bittern" came to English from Old French butor, itself from Gallo-Roman butitaurus, a compound of Latin būtiō (buzzard) and taurus (bull).

Bitterns usually frequent reed beds and similar marshy areas and feed on amphibians, reptiles, insects, and fish.

Bitterns, like herons, egrets, and pelicans, fly with their necks retracted, unlike the cranes, storks, ibises, spoonbills, and geese which fly with necks extended and outstretched. The genus Ixobrychus was recently found to be paraphyletic with the Botaurus genus, and Ixobrychus was then merged into Botaurus.

== Species ==
There are currently 14 extant species divided into two genera within Botaurinae:

Image	Genus	Living species
	Botaurus Stephens, 1819	American bittern (Botaurus lentiginosa); Eurasian bittern or great bittern (Botaurus stellaris); South American bittern (Botaurus pinnatus); Australasian bittern (Botaurus poiciloptilus); Little bittern (Botaurus minutus); Australian little bittern (Botaurus dubius); †New Zealand little bittern (Botaurus novaezelandiae); Cinnamon bittern (Botaurus cinnamomeus); Stripe-backed bittern (Botaurus involucris); Least bittern (Botaurus exilis); Yellow bittern (Botaurus sinensis); Schrenck's bittern (Botaurus eurhythmus); Dwarf bittern (Botaurus sturmii); Black bittern (Botaurus flavicollis); †Botaurus hibbardi (fossil)
	Zebrilus Bonaparte, 1855	Zigzag heron or zigzag bittern (Zebrilus undulatus)
