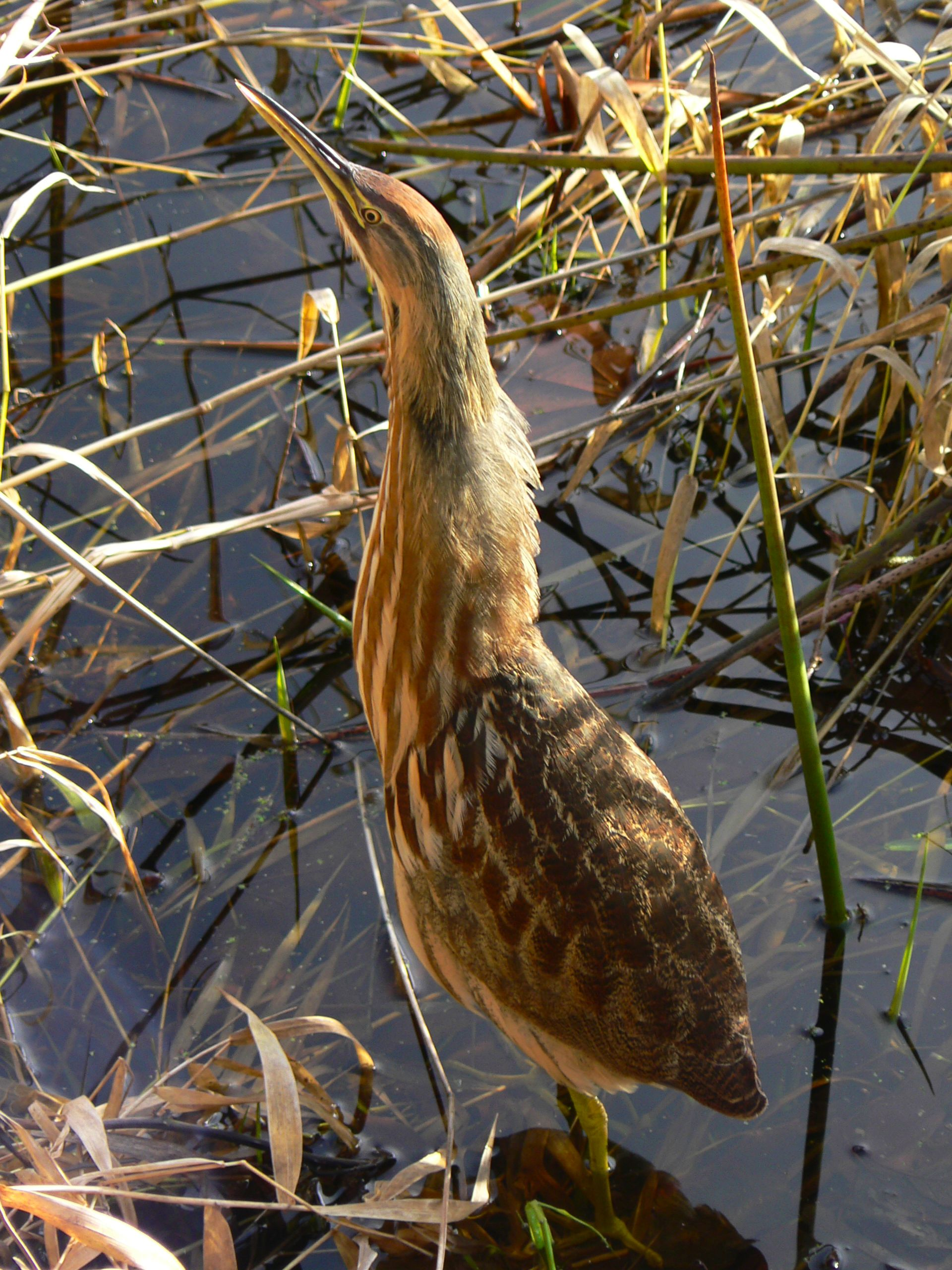
- American bittern (Botaurus lentiginosus)

Scientific classification
- Kingdom: Animalia
- Phylum: Chordata
- Class: Aves
- Order: Pelecaniformes
- Family: Ardeidae
- Subfamily: Botaurinae
- Genus: Botaurus; Stephens, 1819

Type species
- Ardea stellaris Linnaeus, 1758

Synonyms
- Ixobrychus Billberg, 1828

= Botaurus =

Genus of birds

Botaurus is a genus of bitterns, a group of wading birds from the heron family Ardeidae. The genus includes species that were previously placed in the genus Ixobrychus.

== Taxonomy ==
The genus Botaurus was introduced in 1819 by the English naturalist James Francis Stephens. Stephens did not specify the type species but this was designated as Ardea stellaris Linnaeus (Eurasian bittern) by George Gray in 1840. The name Botaurus is Medieval Latin for a bittern. The word combines Latin bos meaning "oxen" (compare butire "to boom") and taurus meaning "bull". In describing the Eurasian bittern Stephens wrote: "At this period the male makes a singular noise, which is compared with the deep bellowing of a bull, and is continued for about two months: ...".

The genus formerly contained fewer species. Molecular genetic studies found that the genus Ixobrychus was paraphyletic with respect to Botaurus. To resolve the non-monophyly the genus Ixobrychus was merged into Botaurus which has priority.

The bitterns are large chunky, heavily streaked brown birds which breed in large reed beds. Almost uniquely for predatory birds, the female rears the young alone. They are secretive and well-camouflaged, and despite their size they can be difficult to observe except for occasional flight views. They eat fish, frogs, and similar aquatic life.

== Species ==
The genus contains 14 species, this includes the New Zealand bittern which is now extinct.

Image	Scientific name	Common name	Distribution
	Botaurus stellaris	Eurasian bittern	Europe and Asia from the British Isles, Sweden and Finland eastwards to Sakhalin Island in eastern Siberia and Hokkaido Island in Japan
	Botaurus poiciloptilus	Australasian bittern	Australia, Tasmania, New Zealand, New Caledonia and Ouvea
	Botaurus lentiginosus	American bittern	the U.S. Gulf Coast states, all of Florida into the Everglades, the Caribbean islands and parts of Central America
	Botaurus pinnatus	Pinnated bittern or South American bittern	Mexico to northern Argentina, though there are few records for Guatemala and Honduras
	Botaurus involucris (formerly placed in Ixobrychus)	Stripe-backed bittern	Colombia, Venezuela, Guyana, Suriname, French Guiana and the island of Trinidad, and in Paraguay, Uruguay, Argentina, Chile and Brazil
	Botaurus exilis (formerly placed in Ixobrychus)	Least bittern	southern Canada to northern Argentina
	Botaurus flavicollis (formerly placed in Ixobrychus)	Black bittern	tropical Asia from Pakistan, India, Bangladesh and Sri Lanka east to China, Indonesia, and Australia
	Botaurus cinnamomeus (formerly placed in Ixobrychus)	Cinnamon bittern	tropical and subtropical Asia from India east to China and Indonesia
	Botaurus eurhythmus (formerly placed in Ixobrychus)	Von Schrenck's bittern	Indonesia, the Philippines, Singapore, Laos, China and Siberia
	Botaurus sturmii (formerly placed in Ixobrychus)	Dwarf bittern	Angola, Benin, Botswana, Burkina Faso, Burundi, Cameroon, Central African Republic, Chad, Republic of the Congo, Democratic Republic of the Congo, Ivory Coast, Equatorial Guinea, Eswatini, Ethiopia, Gabon, Gambia, Ghana, Guinea, Kenya, Liberia, Malawi, Mali, Mauritania, Mozambique, Namibia, Niger, Nigeria, Rwanda, Senegal, Sierra Leone, Somalia, South Africa, Spain (the Canary Islands), Sudan, Tanzania, Togo, Uganda, Zambia, and Zimbabwe
	Botaurus minutus (formerly placed in Ixobrychus)	Little bittern	Africa, central and southern Europe, western and southern Asia, and Madagascar
	Botaurus sinensis (formerly placed in Ixobrychus)	Yellow bittern	northern Indian Subcontinent, east to the Russian Far East, Japan and Indonesia.
	Botaurus dubius (formerly placed in Ixobrychus)	Black-backed bittern	Australia and southern New Guinea
