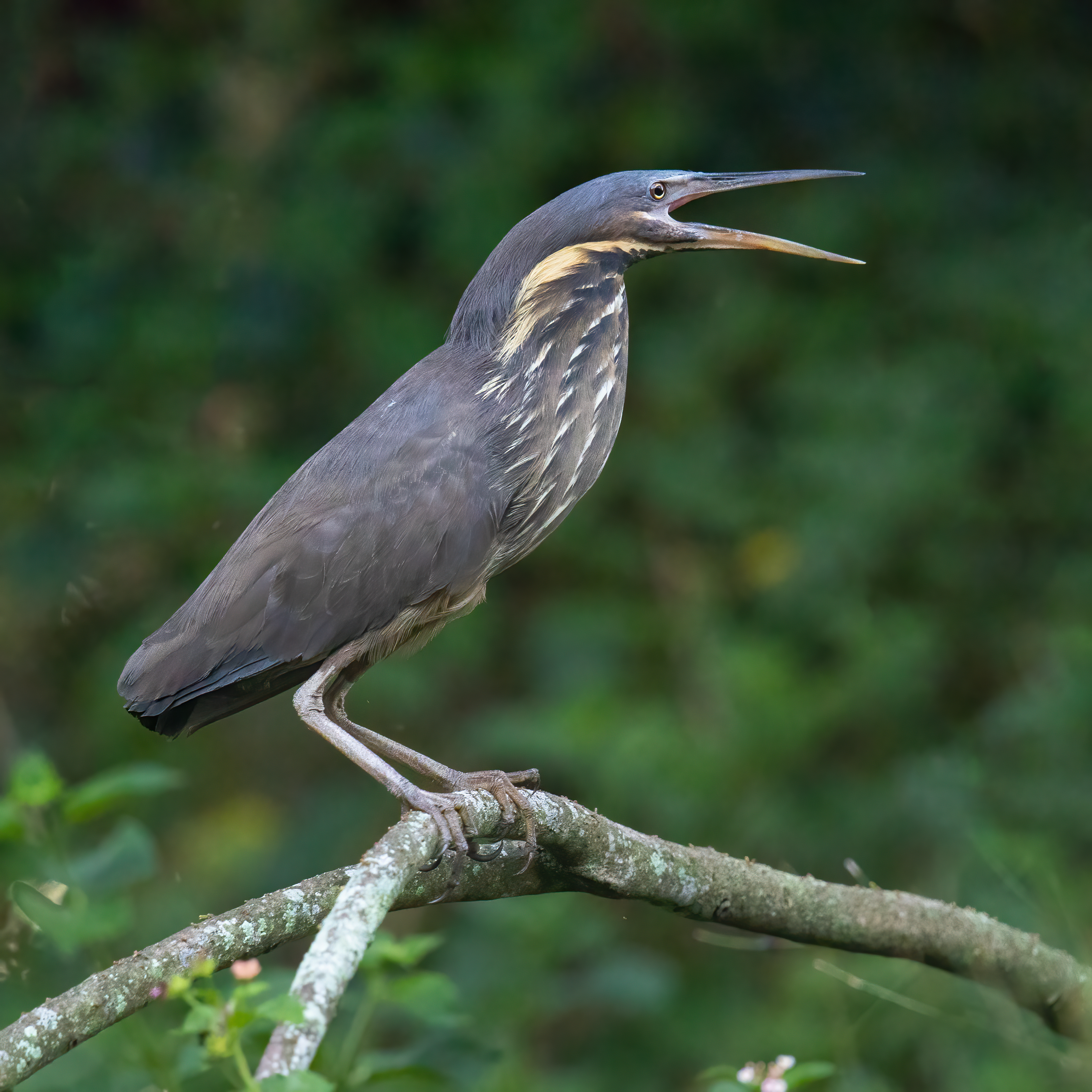

Conservation status
- Least Concern (IUCN 3.1)

Scientific classification
- Kingdom: Animalia
- Phylum: Chordata
- Class: Aves
- Order: Pelecaniformes
- Family: Ardeidae
- Genus: Botaurus
- Species: B. flavicollis

Binomial name
- Botaurus flavicollis (Latham, 1790)
- Range of B. flavicollis Breeding range Year-round range Nonbreeding range

Synonyms
- Dupetor flavicollis

= Black bittern =

Species of bird

The black bittern (Botaurus flavicollis) is a bittern of Old World origin, breeding in tropical Asia from Pakistan, India, Bangladesh and Sri Lanka east to China, Indonesia, and Australia. It is mainly resident, but some northern birds migrate short distances. This species was formerly placed in the genus Ixobrychus.

== Taxonomy ==
The black bittern was formally described in 1790 by the English ornithologist John Latham under the binomial name Ardea flavicollis. He used the English name "yellow-necked heron" and specified the type locality as India. The black bittern was formerly placed in the genus Ixobrychus but when a molecular phylogenetic study of the heron family Ardeidae published in 2023 found that Ixobrychus was paraphyletic, Ixobrychus was merged into the genus Botaurus that had been introduced in 1819 by the English naturalist James Francis Stephens. The genus name Botaurus is Medieval Latin for a bittern. The specific epithet flavicollis combines Latin flavidus meaning "yellowish" with Modern Latin -collis meaning "-throated".

Three subspecies are recognised:

- B. f. flavicollis (Latham, 1790) – India to Indochina, Philippines and west, central Indonesia
- B. f. australis (Lesson, RP, 1831) – east Indonesia, New Guinea, Bismarck Archipelago and Australia
- B. f. woodfordi (Ogilvie-Grant, 1888) – Bougainville Island to Rennell Island (north to south Solomon Islands, except Makira)

== Description ==
It is a medium sized bittern at 54–66 cm (21–26 in) in length. It has dark upperparts with a dark bill. The male is black above with buff neck sides and with a neck is heavily streaked with brown. The female is dark brown rather than black. The juvenile is like the female but paler. They can be difficult to see, given their skulking lifestyle and reed bed habitat, but tend to fly fairly frequently when the all black upperparts makes them unmistakable.

== Behaviour and ecology ==
=== Breeding ===
Their breeding habitat is reed beds. They nest on platforms of reeds in shrubs, or sometimes in trees. Three to five eggs are laid. The chicks are covered with white down with brown patches. They first wander from their nest when aged around 15 days.

=== Food and feeding ===
Black bitterns feed on frogs, fish up to 15cm in length, crustacea and insects. They are crepuscular and nocturnal, mainly feeding at dusk and at dawk.

== Conservation status ==
=== Australia ===
Black bitterns are not listed as threatened on the Australian Environment Protection and Biodiversity Conservation Act 1999. In the state of State of Victoria, Australia, the black bittern is listed as threatened on the Victorian Flora and Fauna Guarantee Act (1988). Under this act, an Action Statement for the recovery and future management of this species has not yet been prepared. On the 2007 advisory list of threatened vertebrate fauna in Victoria, the black bittern is listed as vulnerable.

== Gallery ==
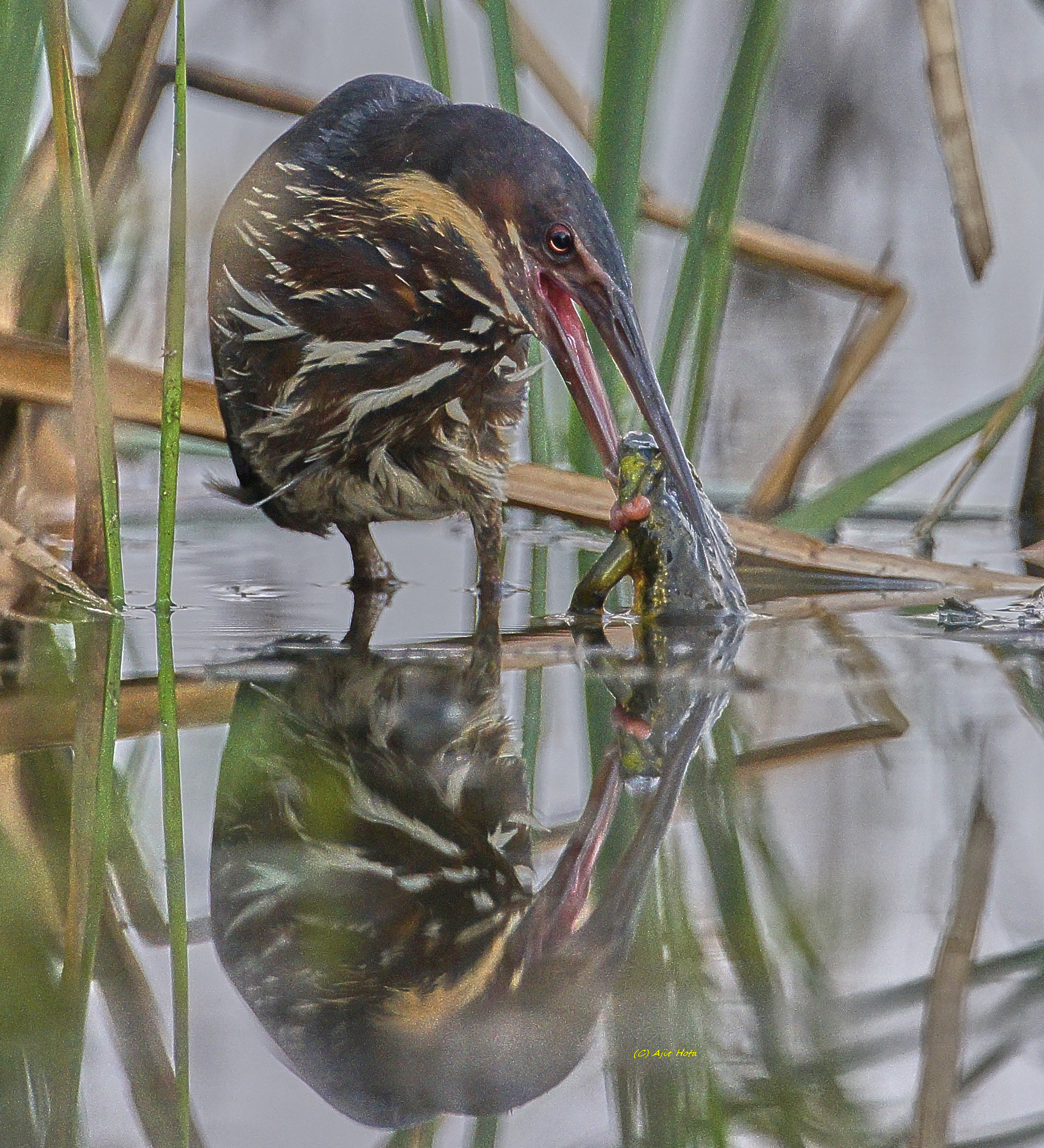
Black bittern with frog catch at Chilika, Odisha
