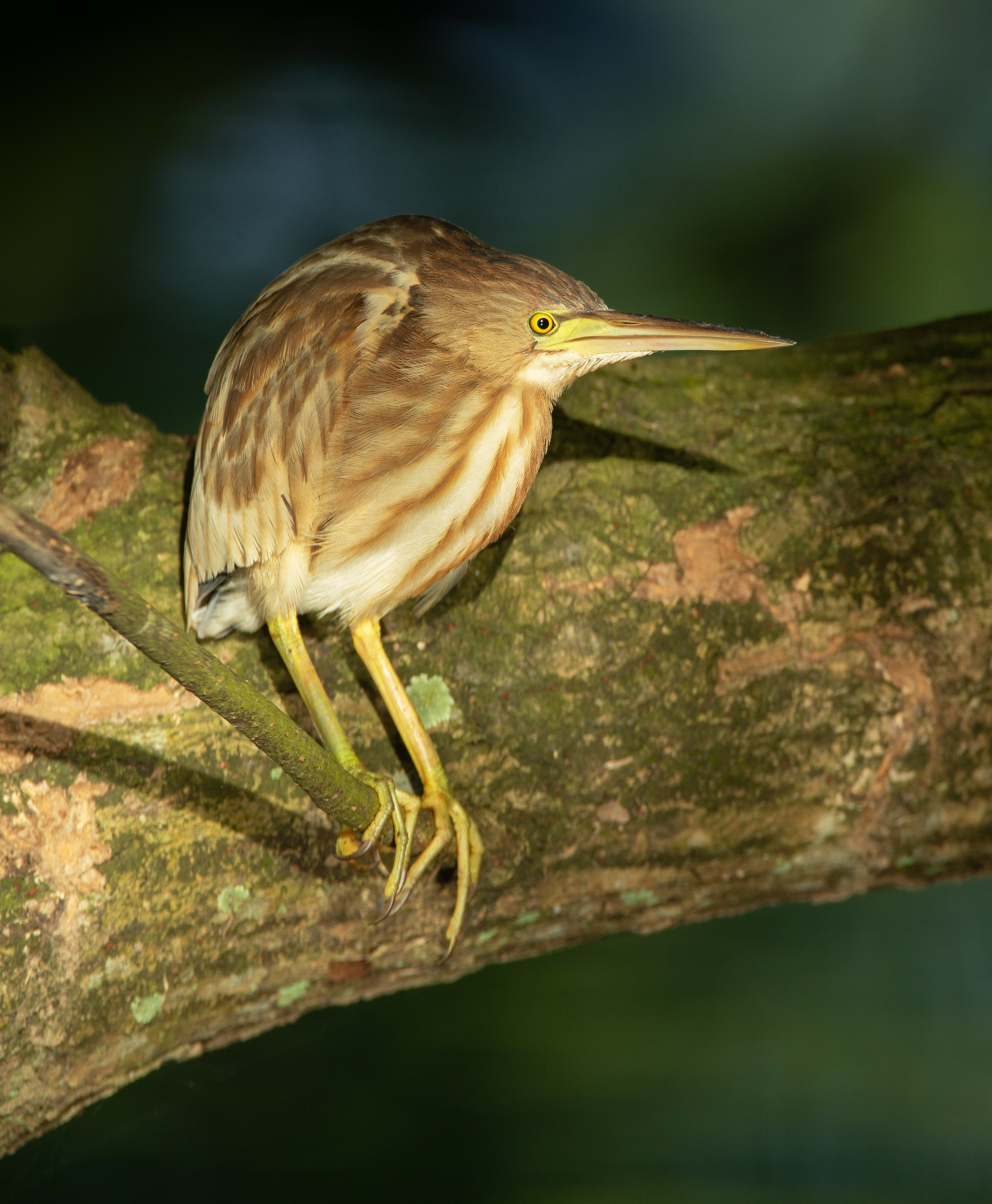

Conservation status
- Least Concern (IUCN 3.1)

Scientific classification
- Kingdom: Animalia
- Phylum: Chordata
- Class: Aves
- Order: Pelecaniformes
- Family: Ardeidae
- Genus: Botaurus
- Species: B. sinensis

Binomial name
- Botaurus sinensis (Gmelin, JF, 1789)
- Range of B. sinensis Breeding range Year-round range Nonbreeding range

= Yellow bittern =

Species of bird

The yellow bittern (Botaurus sinensis) is a small bittern of Old World origins that breeds in the northern Indian subcontinent, east to the Russian Far East, Japan, and Indonesia. It is mainly a resident bird, but some northern birds migrate short distances. It has been recorded as a vagrant in Alaska.

== Taxonomy ==
The yellow bittern was formally described in 1789 by Johann Friedrich Gmelin in his revised and expanded edition of Systema Naturae. He placed it with the herons, cranes, storks, and bitterns in the genus Ardea and coined the binomial name Ardea sinensis. Gmelin based his description on the "Chinese heron" that had been included by the English ornithologist John Latham in his multi-volume work A General Synopsis of Birds. Latham based his description on a collection of Chinese drawings. The yellow bittern was formerly placed in the genus Ixobrychus. A molecular phylogenetic study of the heron family Ardeidae published in 2023 found that Ixobrychus was paraphyletic, and to create monophyletic genera, Ixobrychus was merged into the genus Botaurus that had been introduced in 1819 by the English naturalist James Francis Stephens. The genus name Botaurus is Medieval Latin for a bittern. The specific epithet sinensis is Modern Latin meaning "China". The species is monotypic: no subspecies are recognised.

== Description ==
The yellow bittern is a small species at 36 to 38 cm (14 to 15 in) in length, with a short neck and longish bill. It has yellow green legs, an ivory bill (darker on top), a short black tail, and yellow irises. The male of the species has a dark cap, chestnut head and neck, with a uniformly dull yellow body above and buff below. The female's cap, neck, and breast are streaked, with a rufous hindneck and upper back and streaked dark red brown and buff under parts. The juvenile of the species resembles the female but is more boldly streaked, brown on its head and back, and mottled with buff above.

== Distribution and habitat ==
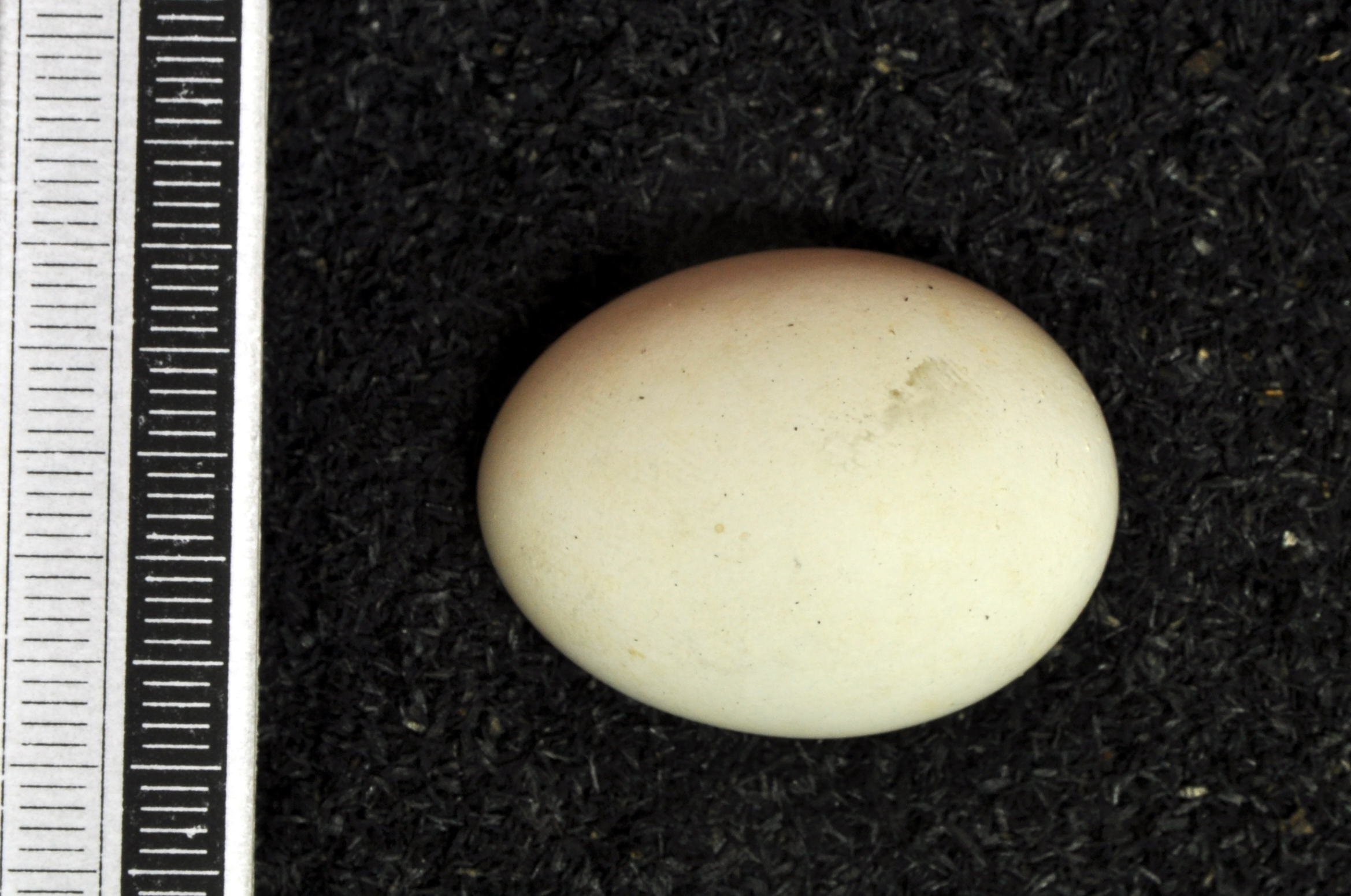
Egg, Collection Museum Wiesbaden

The yellow bittern lives in freshwater marshes and swamps. It nests in small constructed platforms of reeds or twigs in the vegetation of reed beds or in trees and shrubs adjacent to or above water.

There has been a single sighting in Great Britain at Radipole Lake in November 1962. However, the British Ornithologists' Union has always considered this occurrence to be of uncertain provenance, and it is not accepted onto the official British List.

== Behaviour and ecology ==
The yellow bittern lays four to six pale blue-green eggs. It feeds on a variety of insects, fish, amphibians, crustaceans and molluscs.

== Conservation ==
The yellow bittern is protected under the Migratory Bird Treaty Act of 1918.

== Gallery ==
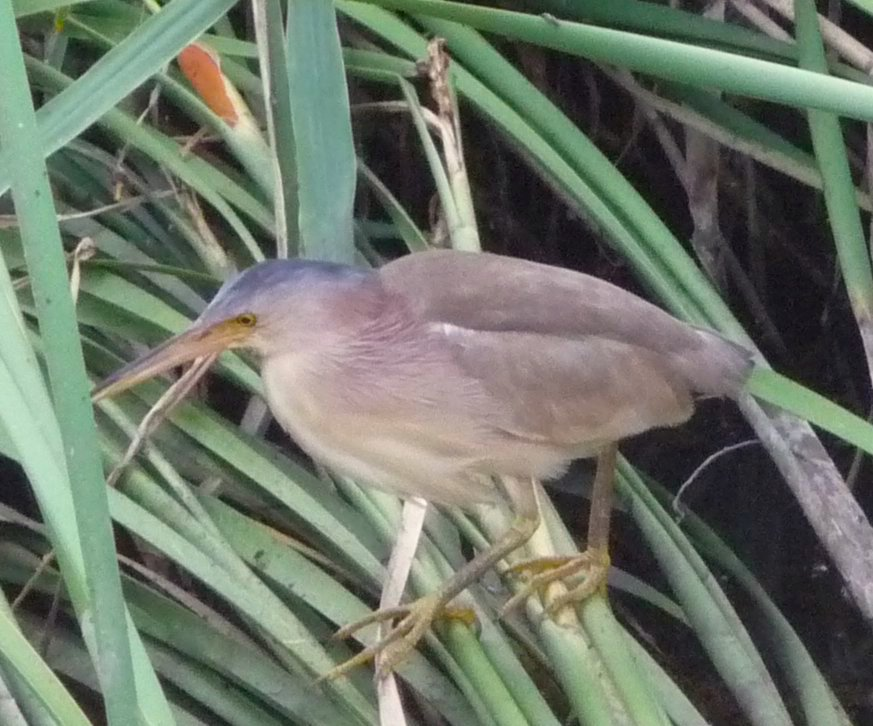
1）Parent locates child birds without chirp (Chiba pref. Japan)

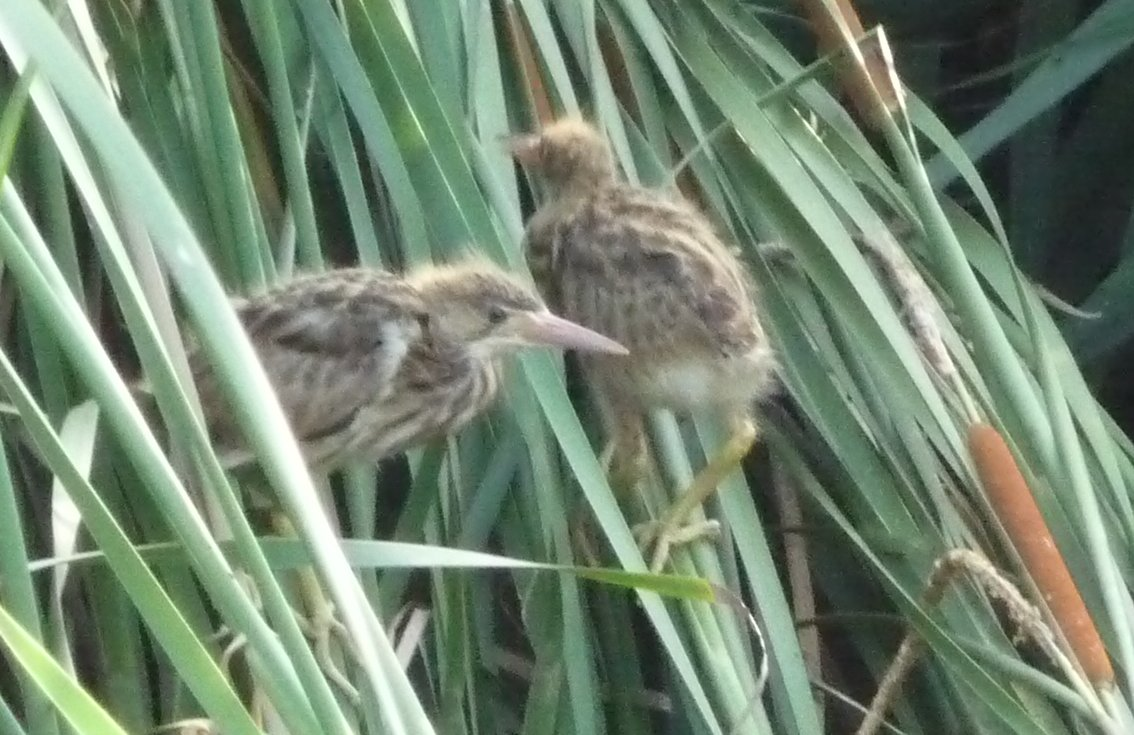
2）Child birds notice parent then exit from thicket

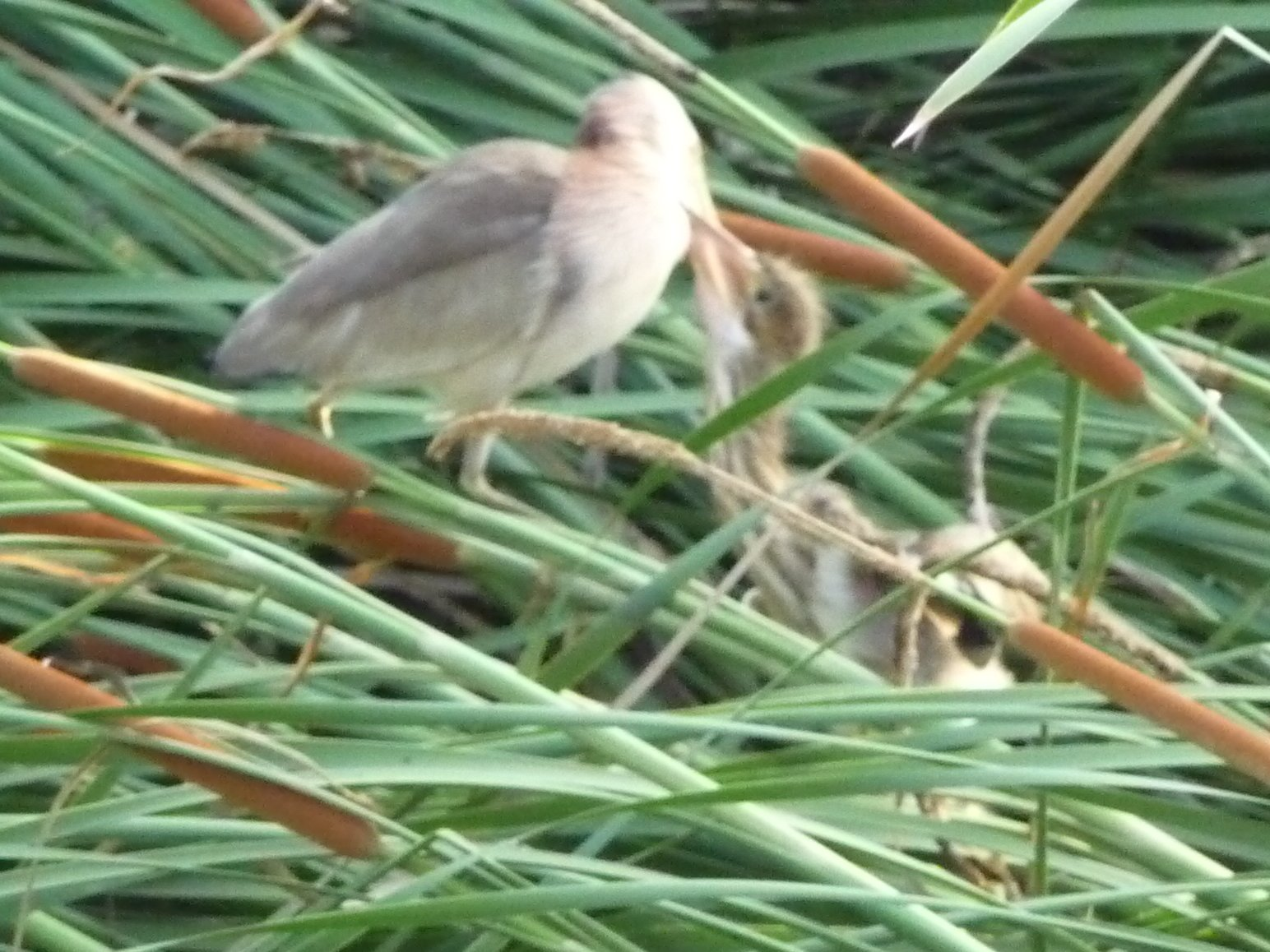
3）Feeding to child birds
