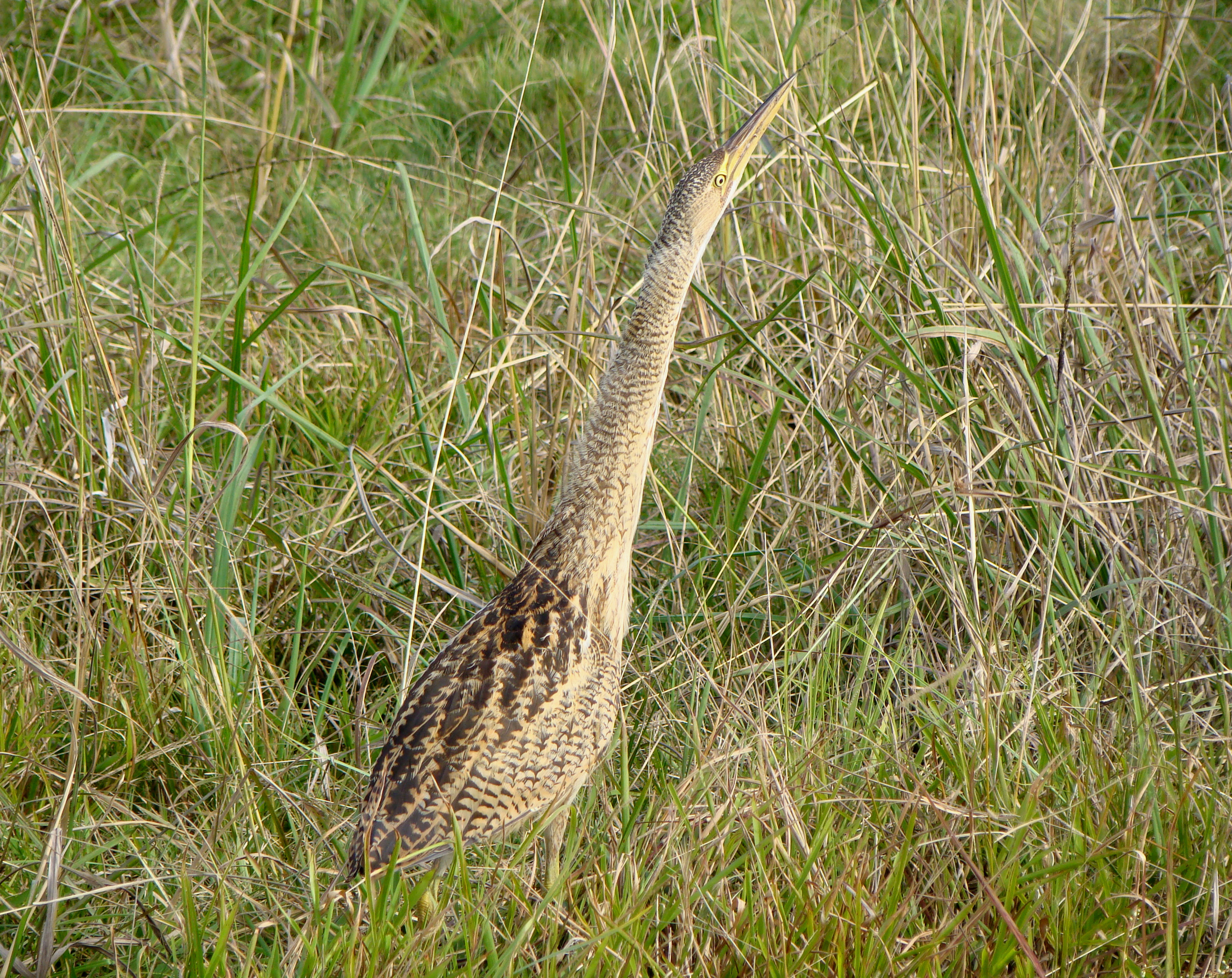

Conservation status
- Least Concern (IUCN 3.1)

Scientific classification
- Kingdom: Animalia
- Phylum: Chordata
- Class: Aves
- Order: Pelecaniformes
- Family: Ardeidae
- Genus: Botaurus
- Species: B. pinnatus

Binomial name
- Botaurus pinnatus (Wagler, 1829)

Synonyms
- Ardea pinnata Wagler, 1829

= Pinnated bittern =

Species of bird

The pinnated bittern (Botaurus pinnatus), also known as the South American bittern, is a large member of the heron family (Ardeidae) found in the New World tropics. Like the other Botaurus bitterns, its plumage is mostly buffy-brown and cryptically patterned. Though it is a widespread species, it is rarely seen – presumably due to its skulking habits – and much about its life history remains little known.

== Description ==
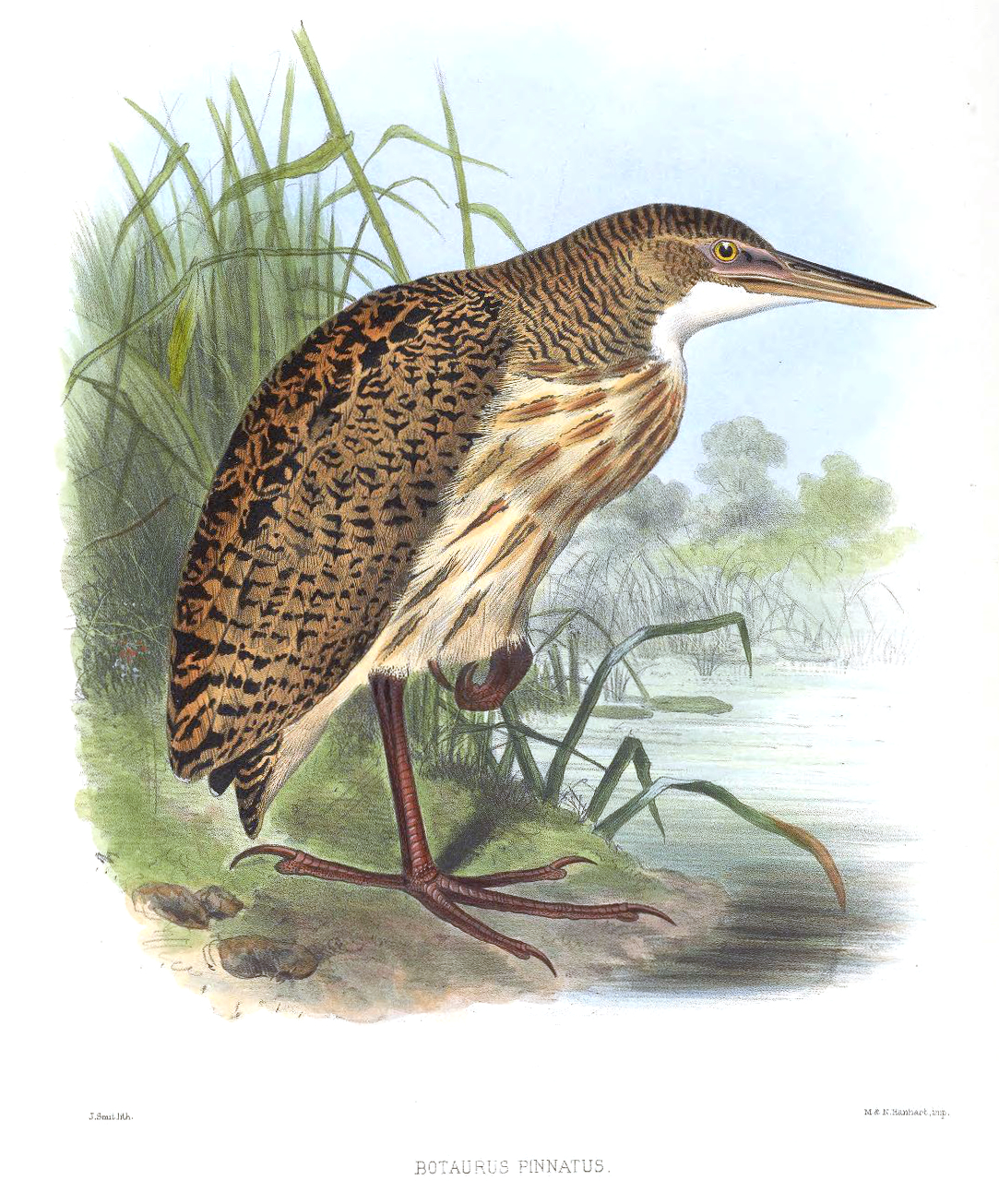

The pinnated bittern is a large heron, measuring between 25–30 in (64–76 cm) with a weight that ranges from 554 to 1,157 g (1.2 to 2.6 lb); males typically weigh considerably more than females. Sexes are similarly plumaged, but females tend to be smaller than males and have brown instead of black on the tail.

Both adults and immature birds are generally buffy, though heavily marked with cryptic patterning. Juveniles tend to have a somewhat more reddish ground color. The throat is unmarked white, the foreneck is white broadly streaked with pale brown, and the rest of the neck is buff with thin black barring. The breast and belly are white with broad pale brown streaks, while the back is buff, heavily streaked and barred with black. Rectrices are black in males and brown in females; the slate-grey remiges create a conspicuous two-toned effect in flight.

The bill is stout and strong, yellowish overall with a dusky upper mandible. The bare facial skin is bright yellow, with a brown line running across the lores. The legs are greenish-yellow, and the iris is yellow.

=== Voice ===
If flushed, the pinnated bittern gives a rough rawk-rawk-rawk call. During the breeding season, the male booms at dusk and into the night; his call is a deep poonk or poonkoo.

== Taxonomy and systematics ==
German naturalist Johann Georg Wagler, who first described the pinnated bittern in 1829, placed it in the genus Ardea at that time. It is sometimes included in a superspecies with the American bittern (B. lentiginosus), while other authors consider the entire genus Botaurus to consist of a single superspecies.

There are currently two recognized subspecies, which are separated by a gap in Central America:

- Botaurus pinnatus caribaeus Dickerman, 1961 – Eastern Mexico, Belize and (rarely) Guatemala.

On average longer bill, shorter wings and tail, paler, less streaking on throat.

- Botaurus pinnatus pinnatus (Wagler, 1829) – southeastern Nicaragua to Ecuador and the Guianas, south through Brazil to Paraguay and northeastern Argentina.

On average shorter bill, longer wings and tail, darker, more streaking on throat.

== Distribution and ecology ==
The alternate name "South American bittern" is a bit misleading, as the species is found as far north as southern Mexico. Its range stretches from the Atlantic slope of southeastern Mexico to northern Argentina, though there are few records for Guatemala and Honduras. The species occurs mainly in low-lying regions, but has been recorded in the Cordillera Oriental of Colombia as much as 8,500 ft (2,590 m) ASL.

It can be found in a variety of freshwater habitats, including dense reed beds and lake borders, flooded tall-grass pastures, marshes and overgrown ditches. Typically, the vegetation in its habitat is dominated by tall sedges (Cyperaceae), water hyacinth (Eichornia), rushes (Juncus), typical reeds (Phragmites) or cattails (Typha). It will also utilize plantations of rice (Oryza) and sugarcane (Saccharum).

The pinnated bittern is largely nocturnal. Though generally solitary, it will gather in small loose groups at favored feeding areas. When frightened, it tends to freeze with its body crouched low and its head raised vertically just high enough to see. It typically flushes only at close range.

Estimates of its population, and of overall population trends, are unknown. Due to its wide range, it is nonetheless regarded a species of Least Concern by the IUCN.

=== Food and feeding ===
Its diet is varied, consisting of fish (including eels), reptiles, amphibians, chicks, arthropods, molluscs, worms (including leeches) and small mammals (even including young common marmosets, Callithrix jacchus), all of which are typically taken in ambush. The pinnated bittern is a patient hunter, often standing motionless for long periods while waiting for prey to move within range.

=== Breeding ===
As typical for Botaurinae (but unlike most herons), the pinnated bittern is a solitary breeder. Its nest, a platform or shallow cup of rush stems or other plant material, is typically built among thick vegetation not far above the water surface. The female lays two to three olive-brown eggs, and is thought to do all of the incubation. Pinnated bitterns are almost exclusively wet season breeders.
