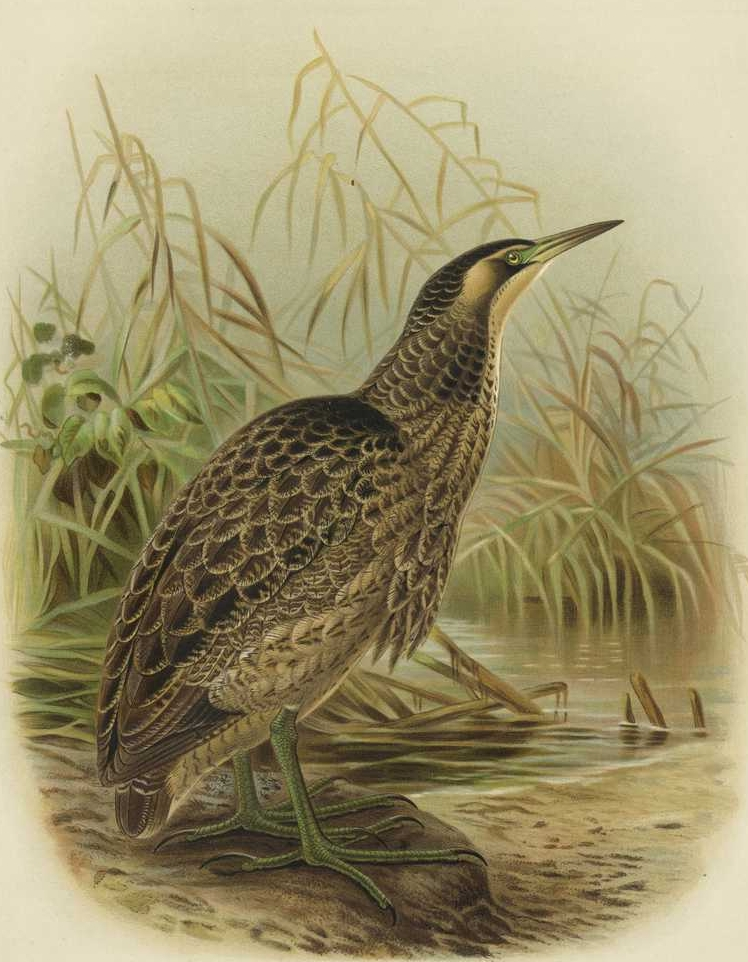
- By J. G. Keulemans in Buller's A History of the Birds of New Zealand

Conservation status
- Vulnerable (IUCN 3.1)

Scientific classification
- Kingdom: Animalia
- Phylum: Chordata
- Class: Aves
- Order: Pelecaniformes
- Family: Ardeidae
- Genus: Botaurus
- Species: B. poiciloptilus

Binomial name
- Botaurus poiciloptilus (Wagler, 1827)
- Global range Year-round range Summer range Winter range

Audio
- Australasian bittern booming in New Zealand

= Australasian bittern =

Species of bird

The Australasian bittern (Botaurus poiciloptilus), or Matuku-hūrepo in Māori, is a stocky, sizeable and elusive heron-like bird native to the wetlands of Australia, New Zealand, and New Caledonia. It belongs to the bittern subfamily of the heron family Ardeidae. The Australasian bittern is best known for its cryptic plumage and behaviours, which allows it to blend into the rushes and reeds of its wetland habitats, making it particularly difficult to spot. Despite being rarely seen, Australasian bittern males have a distinct "booming" call that can carry long distances. This call is said to resemble that of a Bunyip, which is why the Australasian bittern is often known as "the Bunyip Bird" in parts of Australia.

Physically, the Australasian bittern stands around 66-76 cm tall with a wingspan of around a metre long. Its streaky, beige, mottled plumage allows it to camouflage itself among the reeds and rushes of its habitat to avoid predators and hunt for prey, undetected. The species primarily feeds on fish, amphibians, and invertebrates, which it hunts by quietly stalking through shallow waters or remaining "frozen" before ambushing its prey.

Historically, the Australasian bittern was described in the early 19th century and has since been of significant interest due to its cryptic nature. The species is classified as Vulnerable on the IUCN Red List, and continues to experience population declines resulting from habitat reduction and disturbance from wetland drainage, climate change and agricultural expansion. Conservation efforts are therefore becoming increasingly necessary for its survival.

Researchers continue to attempt to understand this birds' daily patterns, ecology, and breeding behaviour to improve current conservation strategies, although their cryptic nature makes this particularly difficult.

== Taxonomy ==
The taxonomic classification of the Australasian bittern remains unresolved, and debated among ornithologists.

Its order, in particular, is ambiguous amongst the literature with some sources placing it in Ciconiiformes and others in Pelecaniformes.

== Physical description ==
The Australasian bittern is a relatively large, stocky bird with noticeable size dimorphism between the sexes. Males can weigh up to 1.4 kg (3.1 lb), while females are smaller, typically weighing around 0.9 kg (2.0 lb).

Beyond size, the species exhibits minimal sexual dimorphism, with males and females displaying similar plumage. Their beige, streaked, and mottled feathers provide them with camouflage in the reeds and rushes of their wetland environments. The bird is characterised by a long yellow beak, broad neck, and short legs, standing around 75 cm tall, though some individuals may reach up to one metre in height.

Juvenile Australasian bitterns have lighter outer wing mottling and yellowish irises, which darken as they mature. Specific details about the timing and progression of these plumage changes are limited.

== Habitat & distribution ==
The Australasian bittern is found in various fresh water wetland environments across New Zealand, south-eastern Australia, south-western Australia, southern Australia and New Caledonia. The biogeographical origins of the species and the dispersal events between Australia, New Zealand, and New Caledonia remain largely unexplored. However, it is known that the Australasian bittern shows a strong preference for densely vegetated habitats rich in rushes, reeds, and sedges, thriving in both temperate and subtropical climates. These birds travel seasonally by flight for long distances (up to 600 km) to exploit coastal wetlands.

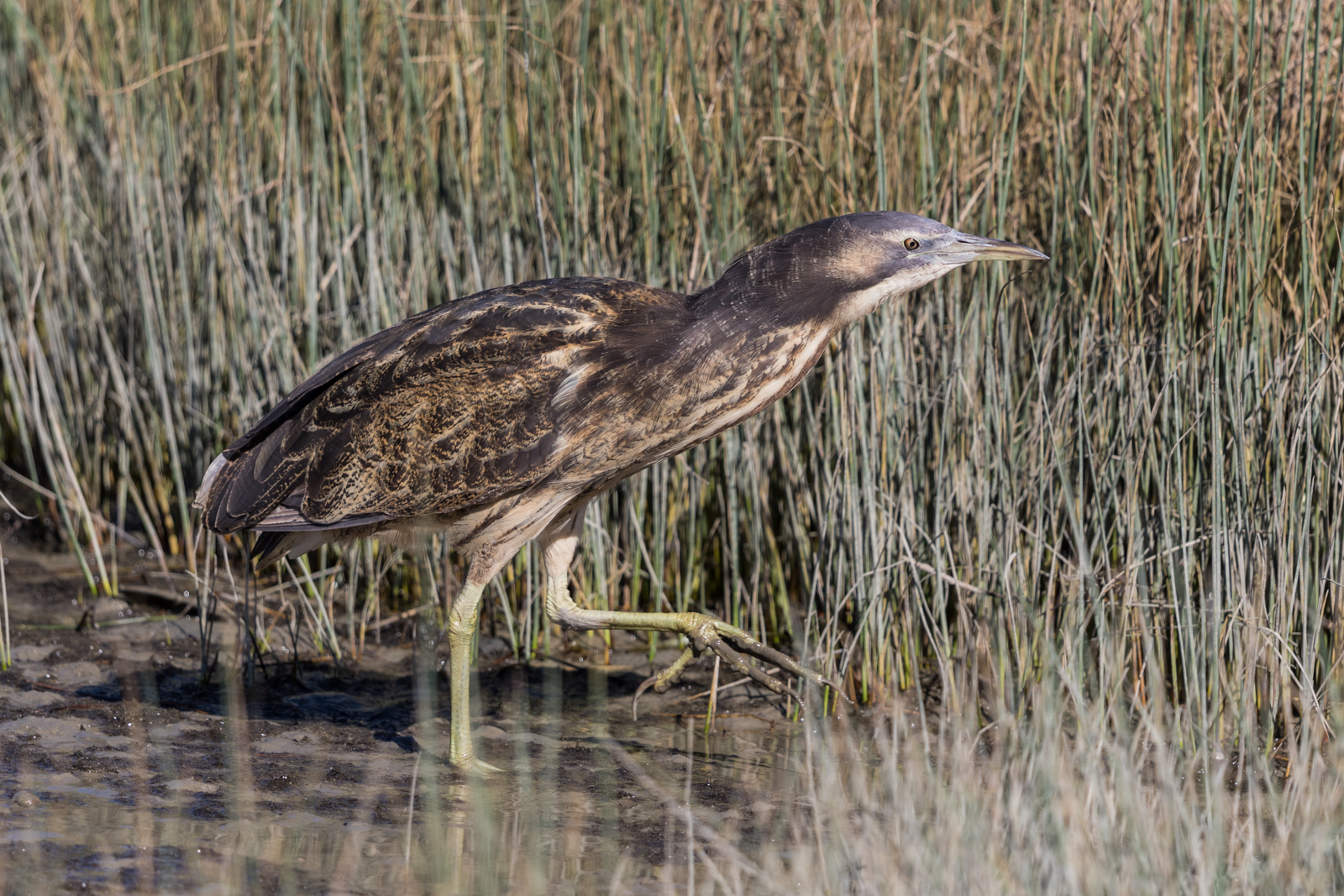
Bittern stalking prey amongst dense vegetation in New Zealand wetlands

Australia's population was estimated at 2,500 mature individuals before around 2010. However, a severe drought around then led to a sharp decline, and current estimates suggest that there are now less than 1,000 individuals, prompting its classification as Endangered under the Australian Environment Protection and Biodiversity Conservation Act 1999. Today, over half of Australia's Australasian bittern population is thought to reside in New South Wales (NSW). Recent research indicates that during the breeding season, rice fields in the Riverina region of NSW hold between 500–1,000 bittern individuals, the largest known breeding population for this species. Before this research, the significance of agricultural wetlands, especially rice fields, as vital habitats for this cryptic species, had been overlooked.

In New Zealand, earlier population estimates of the Australasian bittern are likely inflated, as the degradation of their habitats and fewer recorded booming males at essential wetland sites, such as Whangamarino (the most significant NZ habitat for the species), suggest a more precarious status.

The species' reliance on specific wetland habitats makes it a key indicator for assessing wetland health, as these birds favour particular habitat locations that provide stable water levels and abundant food sources.

== Diet ==
The Australasian bittern exhibits a diverse, opportunistic diet primarily comprising freshwater aquatic organisms, including fish, frogs, and eels. In addition, they are known to consume some insects and small mammals, such as mice. Research indicates that these birds often hunt for larger prey while foraging.

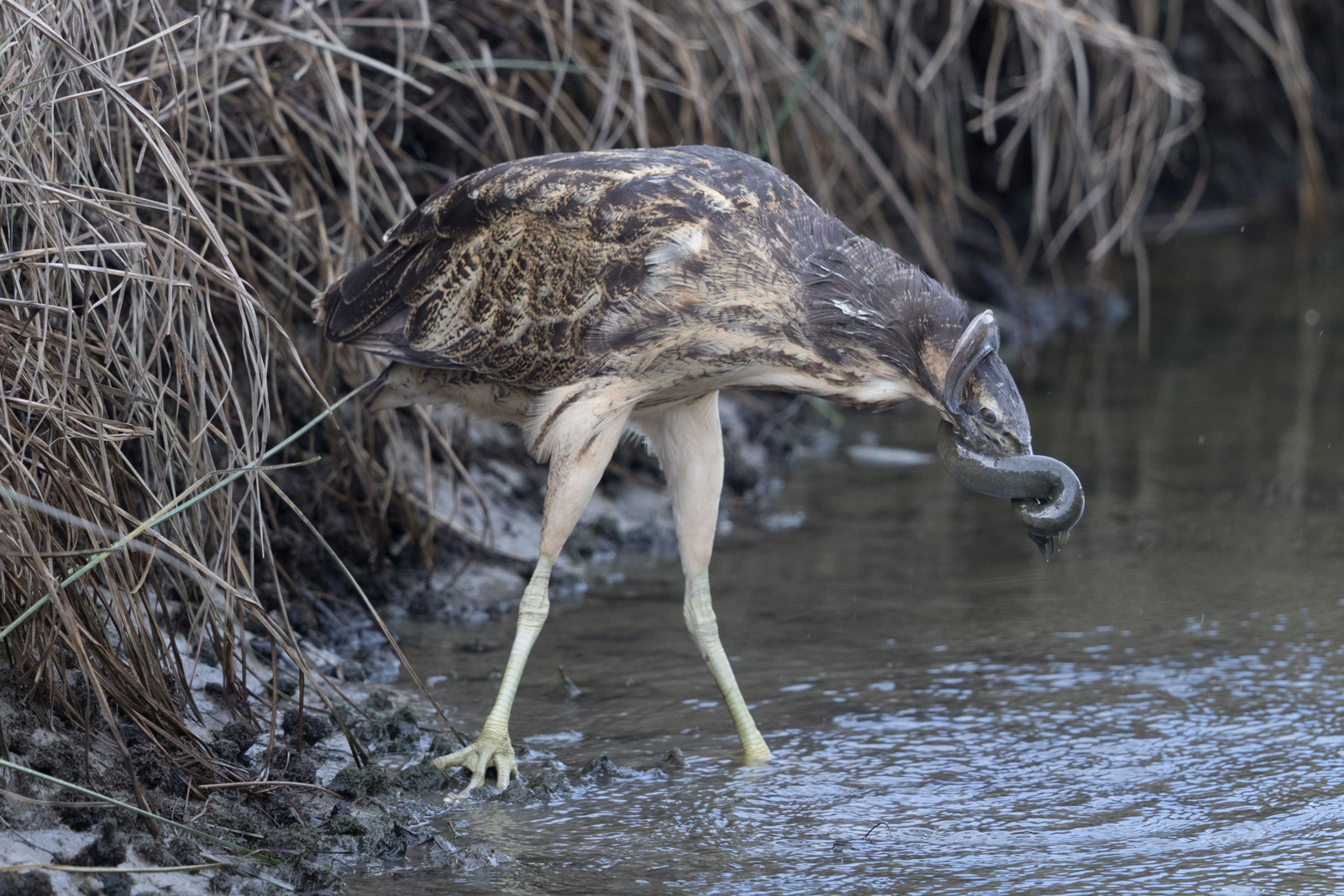
Bittern wrestling with an eel

While bitterns primarily consume fish, their opportunistic diet suggests they can adapt to changes in food availability, boosting their resilience to fluctuating food availability. Nevertheless, recent studies reveal that Australasian bitterns face increased nutritional stress due to irregularities in their diet. These irregularities are driven by periods of insufficient access to high-quality food sources, which can negatively impact their growth and reproductive success and deplete their fat reserves. The bittern's barriers to accessing food have been linked to climate change effects, including global warming, urban expansion, habitat destruction, over-exploitation, the introduction of non-native species, and other anthropogenic-driven environmental changes.

== Breeding ==
Australasian bitterns share several reproductive traits with other species in the Botaurus genus, and has a breeding season that spans from June to February.

A key characteristic of Australasian bitterns is the male's distinctive "booming" vocalisations, which is thought to attract mates and assist in defending their territories against other bittern males. These booms can be heard up to 4 kilometres (2.5 mi) away from the bird. In contrast, females are generally quieter but may occasionally produce "bubbling" sounds or louder calls when alarmed. Females take on the primary responsibilities of incubating the eggs in their nests and later feeding the hatchlings.

Information and data on nesting and reproductive biology of Australasian bitterns is limited.

== Cryptic behaviours ==
The Australasian bittern exhibits various complex and cryptic behaviours, underscoring why it has been a challenging species to detect and study. This species demonstrates all four types of cryptic features found in members of the Botaurus genus: visual crypsis, behavioural crypsis, spatial crypsis (due to its habitat selection of dense vegetation), and temporal crypsis.

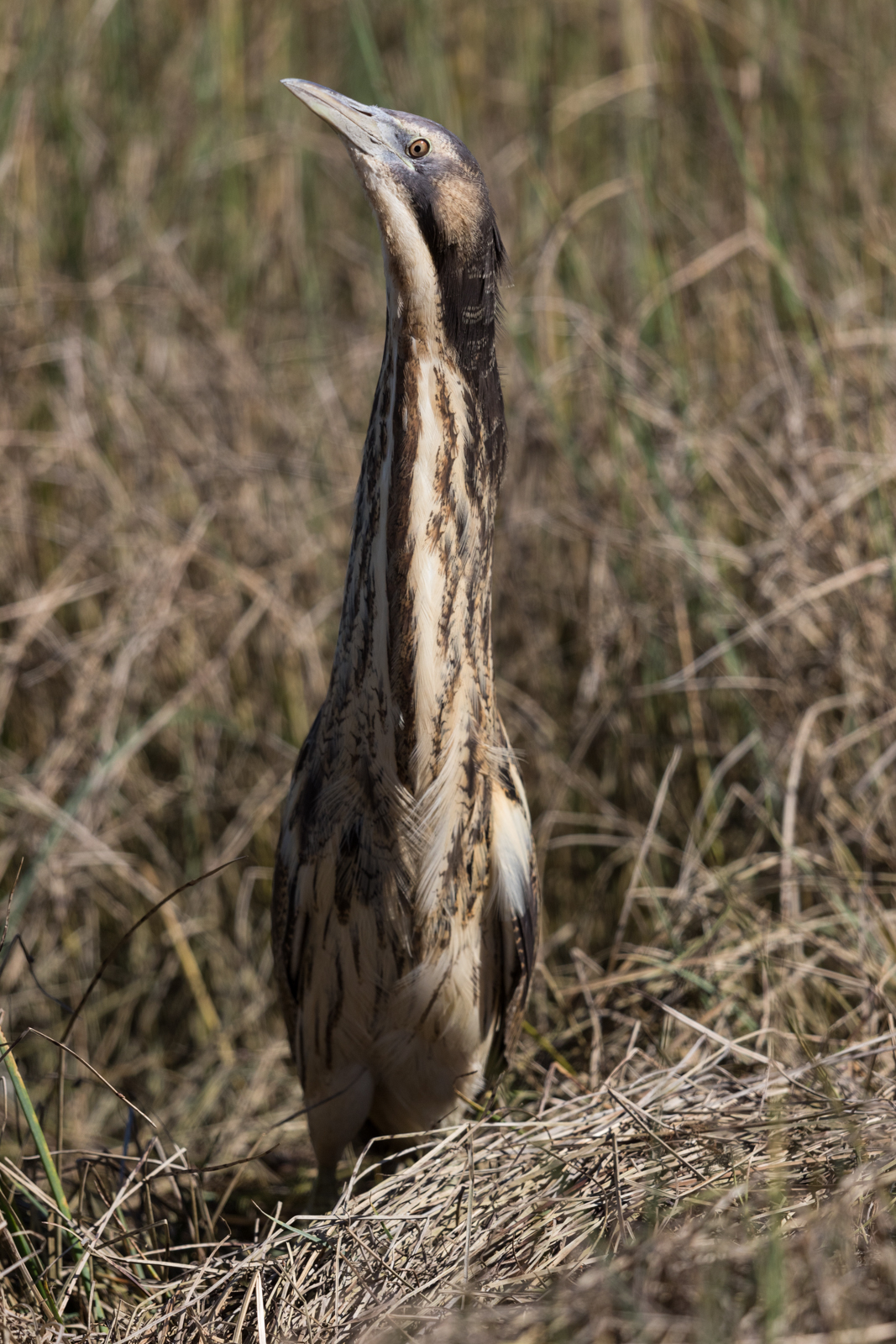
Australasian bittern exhibiting its "freeze" or "surveillance" posture

When disturbed by humans or predators, bitterns often freeze in a rigid pose. This behaviour, combined with their beige, striated and mottled plumage, makes them difficult to detect among the surrounding vegetation. Upon approach, they may exhibit a characteristic "freeze response", silently retreat into the vegetation or flatten their bodies against the ground. They may also slowly take flight as a form of retreat, though this behaviour has been observed only a few times, typically occurring when they are more than 20 metres (66 ft) away from a disturbance or perceived threat. The cryptic behaviour of Australasian bitterns extends to their foraging. Some bittern individuals have exhibited nocturnal behaviours, particularly around dusk and at night when foraging for smaller animals. They adopt a stealthy and cautious motion as they move along the edges of their dense habitats, looking for food. While they are frequently found foraging at night, they have also been observed foraging during the day, especially in winter. This apparent flexibility in their foraging behaviours complicates current understandings of their daily habits. Furthermore, their foraging patterns appear to vary based on nearby anthropogenic activities or changes, such as duck hunting seasons and fluctuations in water levels.

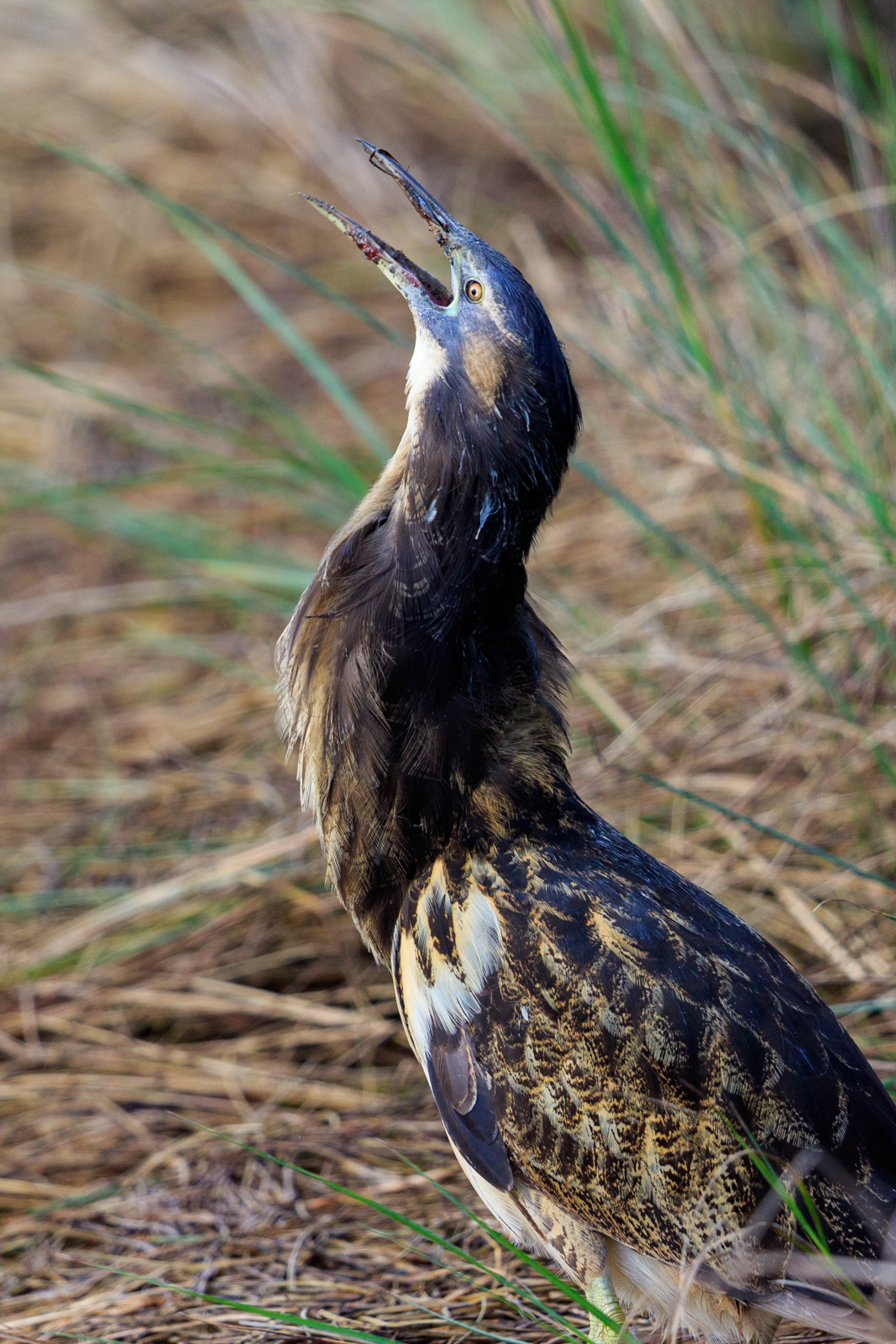
Australasian bittern slowly swallowing a large eel

When actively hunting, Australasian bitterns typically employ a stalking method, primarily at the edges of ponds. They first remain motionless for up to ten minutes while swiveling their eyes to survey their surroundings before opportunistically targeting their prey. This eye-swiveling technique helps them see beneath their bills while keeping their beaks high in the air to maintain a frozen surveillance posture and blend into their environment. Once they have locked on to a prey, they slowly and steadily "stalk" them until they are proximate enough that they can stab or grab their prey with minimal commotion or sound. This is why the quality and depth of water in their habitat are important for the Australasian bittern's ability to detect and access their prey. When hunting for frogs, they have also been observed to manipulate and toss the prey before consuming them slowly.

Socially, Australasian bitterns are mainly solitary, with occasional sightings of pairs together. However, there are significant gaps in current understandings of their social behaviours and daily activity patterns.

== Species significance ==
The Australasian bittern holds cultural, environmental, and economic importance.

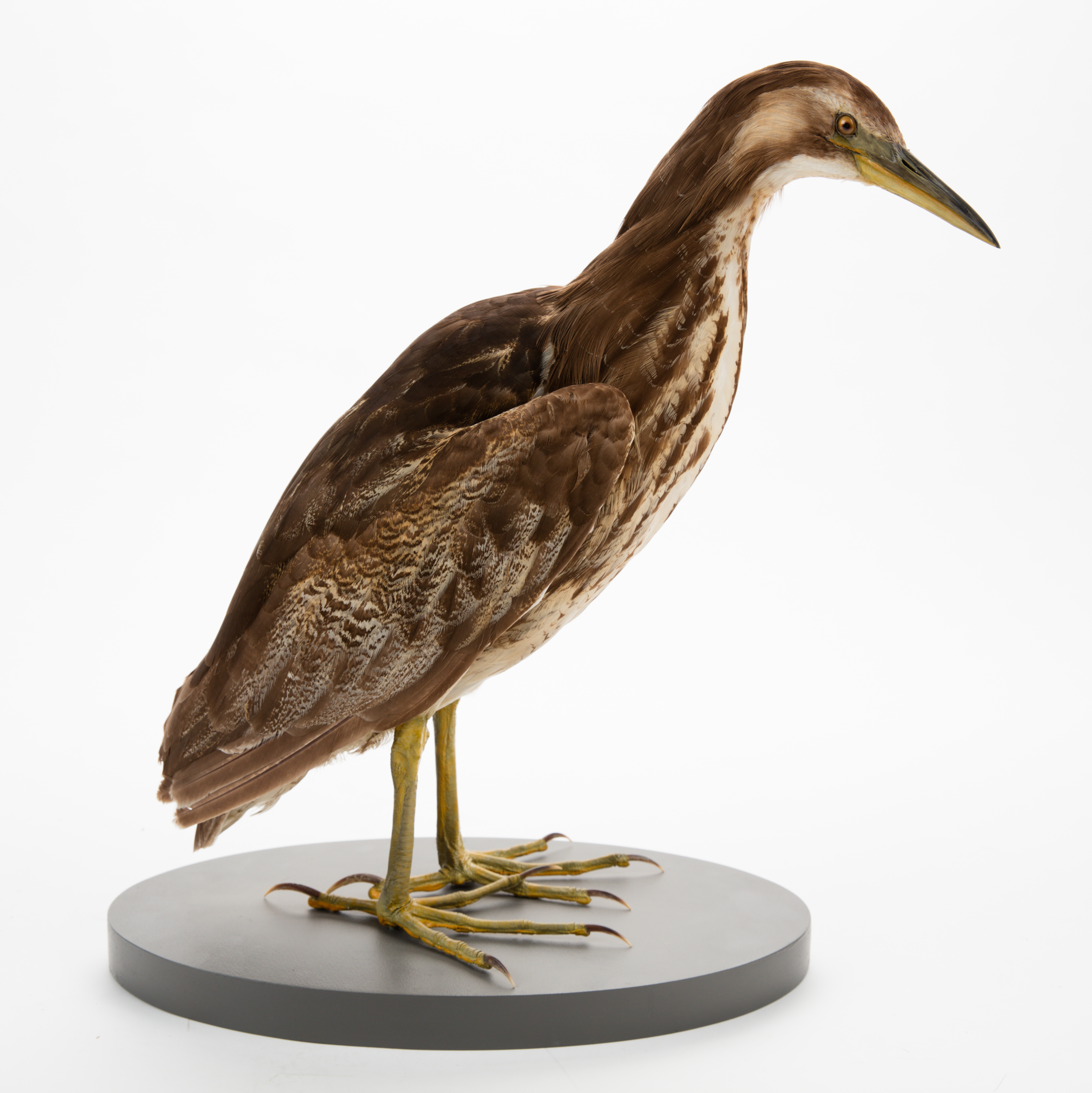
Male Australasian bittern mount from the collection of Auckland Museum

This species is relevant and acknowledged in New Zealand in Te Ao Māori, referenced in historical Māori legends, metaphors, and place names. Historically, the bittern's feathers were also used for ceremonial decoration, and the bird served as a food source for tangata whenua. While cultural connections with indigenous Australians are less documented, the bittern is known as boordenitj in Noongar, hinting to a likely historical and cultural association with the species.

Ecologically, the Australasian bittern is a crucial indicator of wetland health, as its survival depends on diverse, high-quality habitats. Wetlands, in turn, provide essential ecosystem services, such as water purification, fish nurseries, and recreational or commercial fishing opportunities.

Increasing awareness of the Australasian bitterns' presence in agricultural environments like rice fields in Australia means that, given how threatened these birds are, future land development proposals will need to consider these birds and their impact on them. For the Riverina's rice fields, bittern conservation is already considered alongside rice-farming policies, especially around water allocation.

== Conservation status ==
Despite its significance to humans, the Australasian bittern faces severe population declines, driven particularly by the loss of wetlands due to agricultural expansion, more frequent dry seasons, altered land use and climate change. In Australia and New Zealand, the clearance and degradation of wetlands has been a significant historical and ongoing threat to these birds. The species is listed as Endangered under Australia's EPBC Act and as Nationally Critical in New Zealand, with fewer than 2,499 mature individuals globally, and trends suggesting further declines.

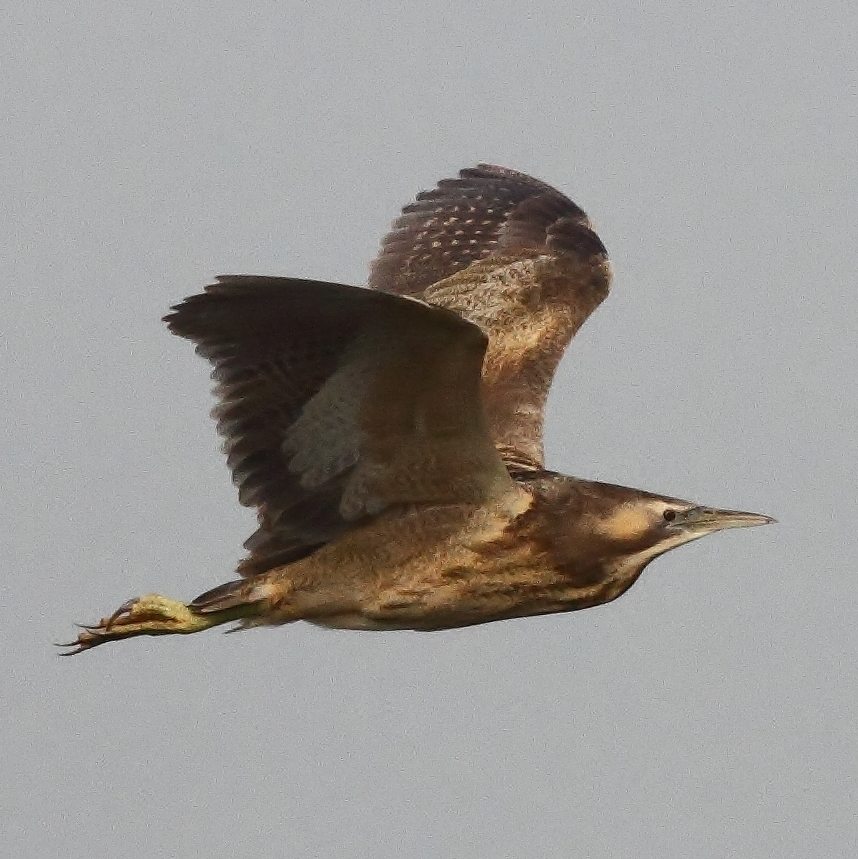
Botaurus poiciloptilus, Edithvale Wetlands, Australia

In Australia, especially the Murray–Darling Basin, wetlands have been significantly diminished. While rice crops provide some novel breeding habitat, reducing rice farming, driven by high water prices and shifting crop preferences (such as cotton), further threatens to reduce suitable bittern habitats.

In New Zealand, declines have been most pronounced after 1970, with the bittern's range now mainly limited to coastal and lowland wetlands of the North Island. Conservation efforts have focused on habitat protection and wetland restoration. However, the ongoing challenges of water allocation, habitat destruction, and predation by introduced mammals continue to pose significant risks to the species' survival.

New Caledonia's population is understudied, with fewer than 50 individuals suspected and limited sightings since 2016.
