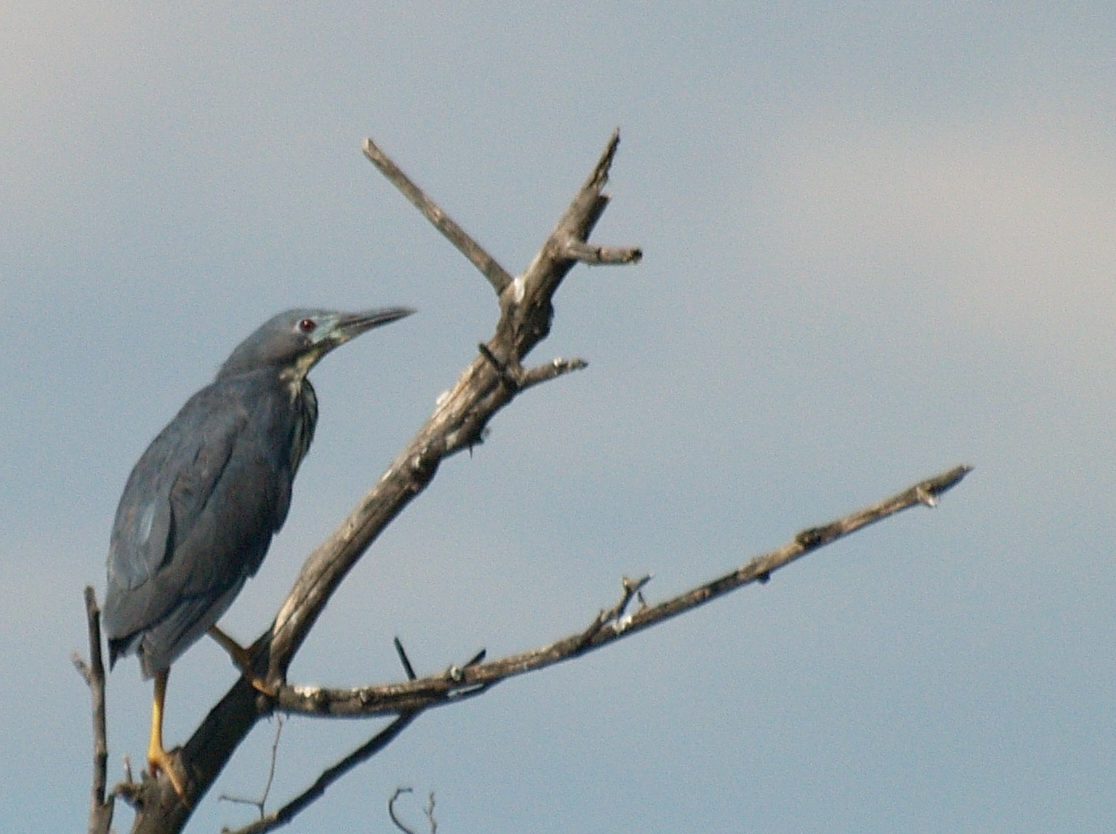

Conservation status
- Least Concern (IUCN 3.1)

Scientific classification
- Kingdom: Animalia
- Phylum: Chordata
- Class: Aves
- Order: Pelecaniformes
- Family: Ardeidae
- Genus: Botaurus
- Species: B. sturmii

Binomial name
- Botaurus sturmii (Wagler, 1827)
- Range of B. sturmii Breeding range Year-round range

= Dwarf bittern =

Species of bird

The dwarf bittern (Botaurus sturmii) is a species of heron in the family Ardeidae that is widely distributed across Sub-Saharan Africa avoiding only the very arid regions. This species was formerly placed in the genus Ixobrychus.

== Taxonomy ==
The dwarf bittern was formally described in 1827 by the German naturalist Johann Georg Wagler under the binomial name Ardea sturmii. He specified the type locality as Senegambia. The specific epithet was chosen to honour the German bird artist Johann Sturm who had provided Wagler with a specimen. The dwarf bittern was formerly placed in the genus Ixobrychus. Molecular genetic studies found that this genus was paraphyletic with respect to Botaurus. To resolve the non-monophyly the genus Ixobrychus was merged into Botaurus which has priority. The species is considered to be monotypic: no subspecies are recognised.

== Distribution ==
It is found in Angola, Benin, Botswana, Burkina Faso, Burundi, Cameroon, Central African Republic, Chad, Republic of the Congo, Democratic Republic of the Congo, Ivory Coast, Equatorial Guinea, Eswatini, Ethiopia, Gabon, Gambia, Ghana, Guinea, Kenya, Liberia, Malawi, Mali, Mauritania, Mozambique, Namibia, Niger, Nigeria, Rwanda, Senegal, Sierra Leone, Somalia, South Africa, Spain (the Canary Islands), Sudan, Tanzania, Togo, Uganda, Zambia, and Zimbabwe. It is a rare vagrant in the Western Palearctic (which consists of Europe, North Africa and the Middle East), with several sightings in the Canary Islands. Two individual were observed on the island of Fuerteventura in the Canary Islands in the winter of 2017.

== Description ==
It is a small bittern, and the same size as the little bittern, to which it is closely related.

== Conservation ==
It is designated least concern.
