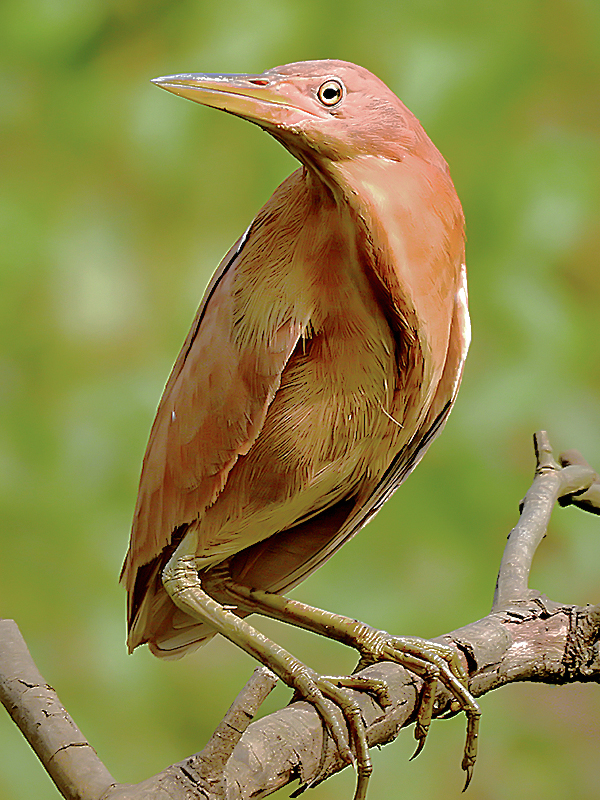
- male in Mangaon, Maharashtra, India

Conservation status
- Least Concern (IUCN 3.1)

Scientific classification
- Kingdom: Animalia
- Phylum: Chordata
- Class: Aves
- Order: Pelecaniformes
- Family: Ardeidae
- Genus: Botaurus
- Species: B. cinnamomeus

Binomial name
- Botaurus cinnamomeus (Gmelin, JF, 1789)
- Breeding Year-round Nonbreeding

= Cinnamon bittern =

Species of bird

The cinnamon bittern (Botaurus cinnamomeus) or chestnut bittern is a small Old World bittern, breeding in tropical and subtropical Asia from India east to China and Indonesia. It is mainly resident, but some northern birds migrate short distances. This species was formerly placed in the genus Ixobrychus.

== Taxonomy ==
The cinnamon bittern was formally described in 1789 by the German naturalist Johann Friedrich Gmelin in his revised and expanded edition of Carl Linnaeus's Systema Naturae. He placed it with herons, cranes, egrets and bitterns in the genus Ardea and coined the binomial name Ardea cinnamomea. Gmelin based his description on the "Chinese heron" that had been included by the English ornithologist John Latham in his multi-volume A General Synopsis of Birds. Latham had based his own description on a partial specimen in the British Museum. The cinnamon bittern was formerly placed in the genus Ixobrychus. A molecular phylogenetic study of the heron family Ardeidae published in 2023 found that Ixobrychus was paraphyletic. To create a monophyletic genus, Ixobrychus was merged into the genus Botaurus that had been introduced in 1819 by the English naturalist James Francis Stephens. The genus name Botaurus is Medieval Latin for a bittern. The specific epithet cinnamomeus is Latin meaning 'cinnamon coloured'. The species is monotypic: no subspecies are recognised.

== Description ==
It is a small bittern at 38–41 cm (15–16 in) length. Possessing a short neck and longish bill, the male is uniformly cinnamon above and buff below. The female is similar but her back and crown are brown, and the juvenile is like the female but heavily streaked brown below. When surprised on its nest or concerned, it assumes the characteristic attitude of bitterns, termed the on-guard. The neck is stretched perpendicularly, bill pointing skyward, while the bird freezes and becomes very hard to see among the surrounding reeds. The wingspan measures 49.5 cm (19.5 in), and the bird weighs 89.5–164 g (3.16–5.78 oz).

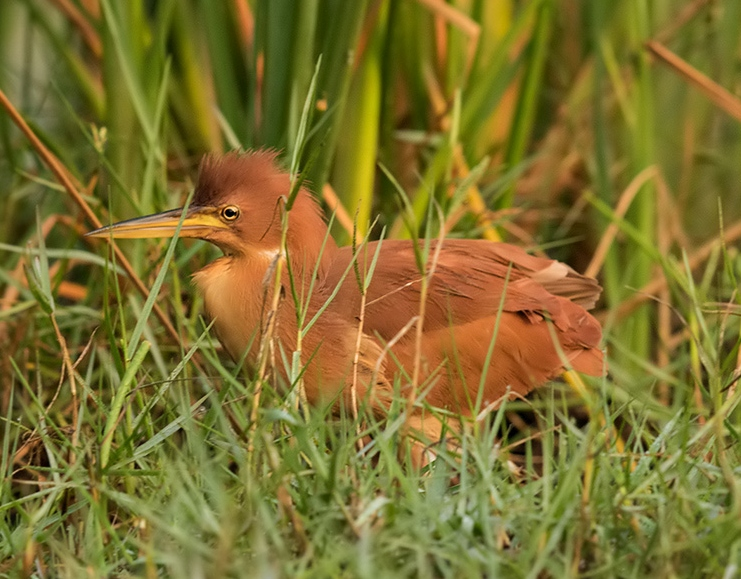
male, Odisha, India

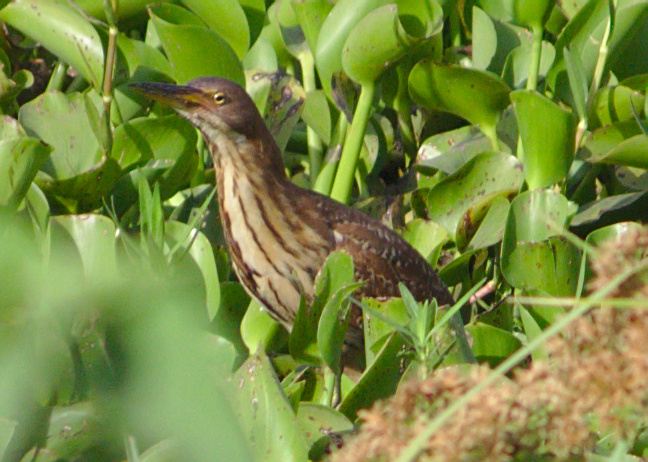
female, Bhopal, India

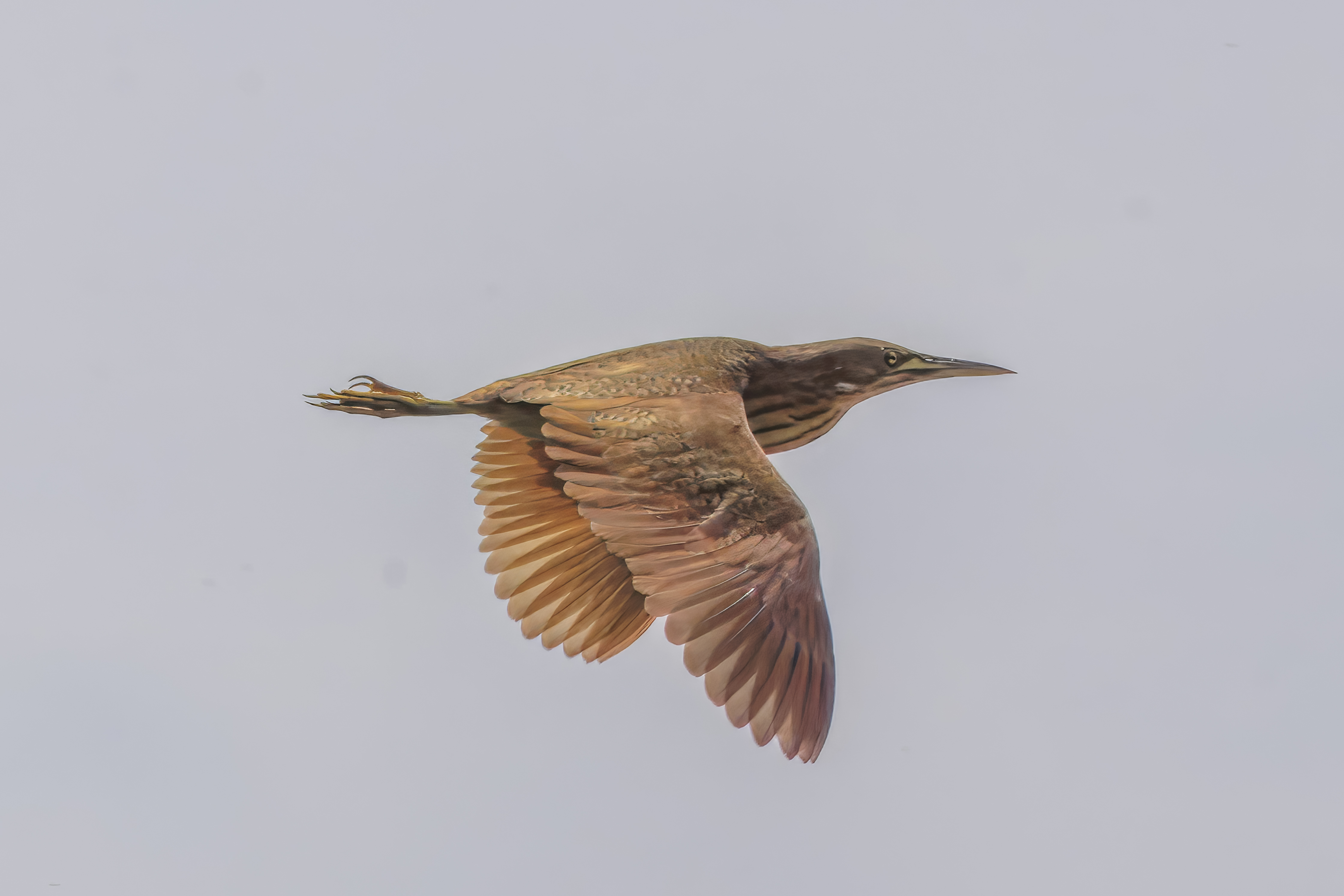
female, Cambodia

== Distribution and habitat ==
The species has an extremely large range throughout Asia; there are breeding populations from India to Indonesia. Vagrants have been in Micronesia, the Seychelles and Afghanistan, among other locations. Global population estimates are uncertain and range from 130,000 to 2,000,000 individuals. They occur at varying elevations by location, up to 2,800–4,000 m (9,200–13,100 ft) in Bhutan.

== Behaviour and ecology ==
The cinnamon bittern breeds in reed beds, nesting on platforms of reeds in shrubs. The time of breeding varies by location. Two to six eggs are laid, measuring 33–36.5 mm (1.30–1.44 in) in length and 25.5–26.4 mm (1.00–1.04 in) in width. Incubation takes around 23 days. The fledging period is unknown. The species can be difficult to see, given their skulking lifestyle and reed bed habitat, but tend to emerge at dusk, when they can be seen creeping almost cat-like in search of frogs. Cinnamon bitterns feed on insects, fish, molluscs, and amphibians. It also feeds vegetable matter to its chicks. The bird feeds alone and defends its feeding territory.
