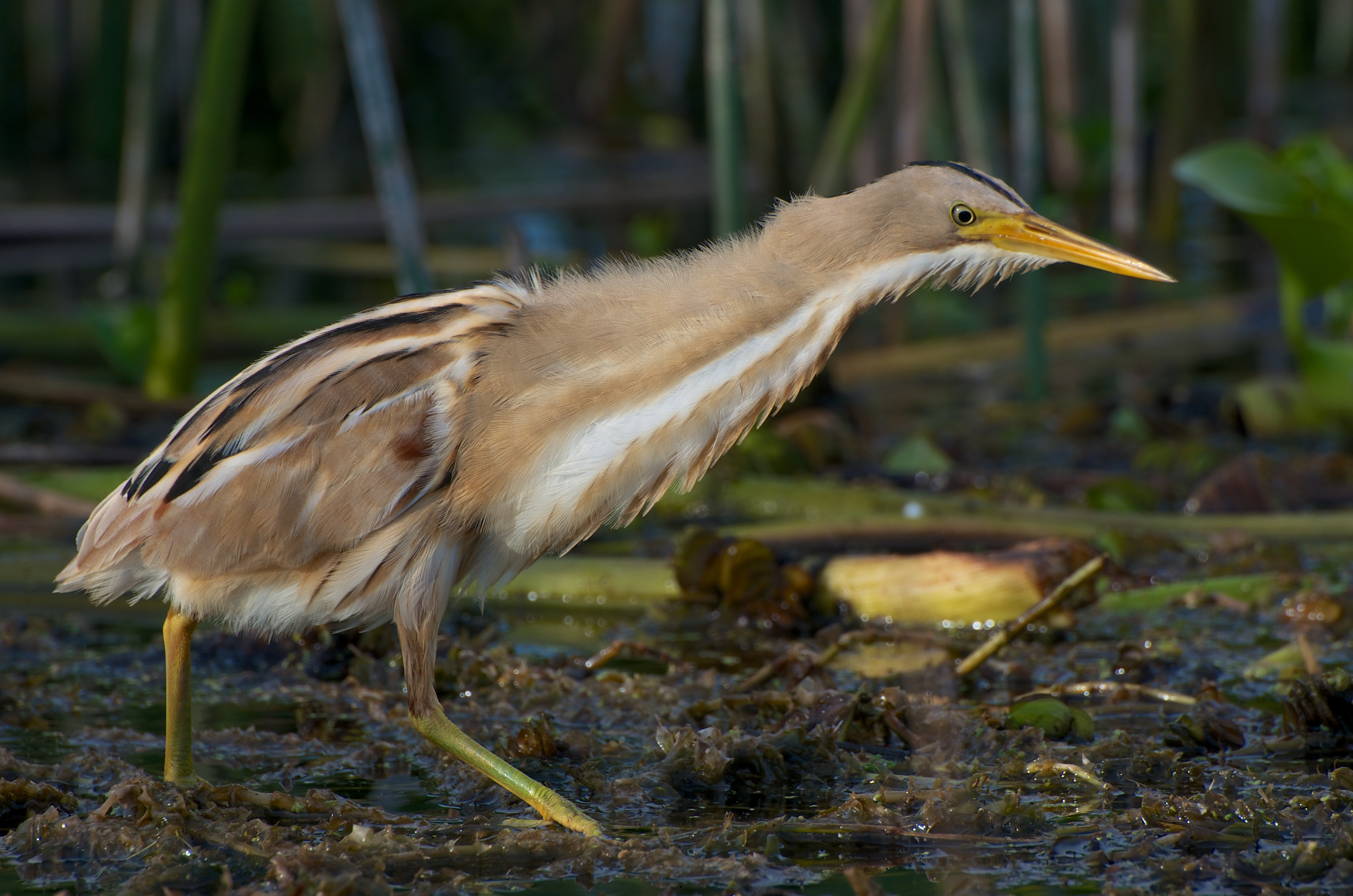

Conservation status
- Least Concern (IUCN 3.1)

Scientific classification
- Kingdom: Animalia
- Phylum: Chordata
- Class: Aves
- Order: Pelecaniformes
- Family: Ardeidae
- Genus: Botaurus
- Species: B. involucris

Binomial name
- Botaurus involucris (Vieillot, 1823)

= Stripe-backed bittern =

Species of bird

The stripe-backed bittern (Botaurus involucris) is a South American bird species belonging to the family Ardeidae. It was formerly placed in the genus Ixobrychus. Commonly found near freshwater swamps, marshes, lake shores and streams, stripe-backed bitterns are distributed in two disjunct populations in the north and south of the continent, spanning both sides of the Andes. Although increasingly researched worldwide, many details of its life history life are lacking, especially compared to other species in its sister clade like the least bittern (Botaurus exilis).

== Taxonomy ==
The stripe-backed bittern was formally described in 1823 by the French ornithologist Louis Vieillot under the binomial name Ardea involucris. Vieillot based his account on the "Garza varia" that had been described in 1805 by Spanish naturalist Félix de Azara in his book Apuntamientos para la historia natural de los páxaros del Paragüay y Rio de la Plata. The stripe-backed bittern was formerly placed in the genus Ixobrychus but after a molecular phylogenetic study of the heron family Ardeidae published in 2023 found that Ixobrychus was paraphyletic, Ixobrychus was merged into Botaurus. The species is treated as monotypic, meaning no subspecies are recognised.

== Description ==
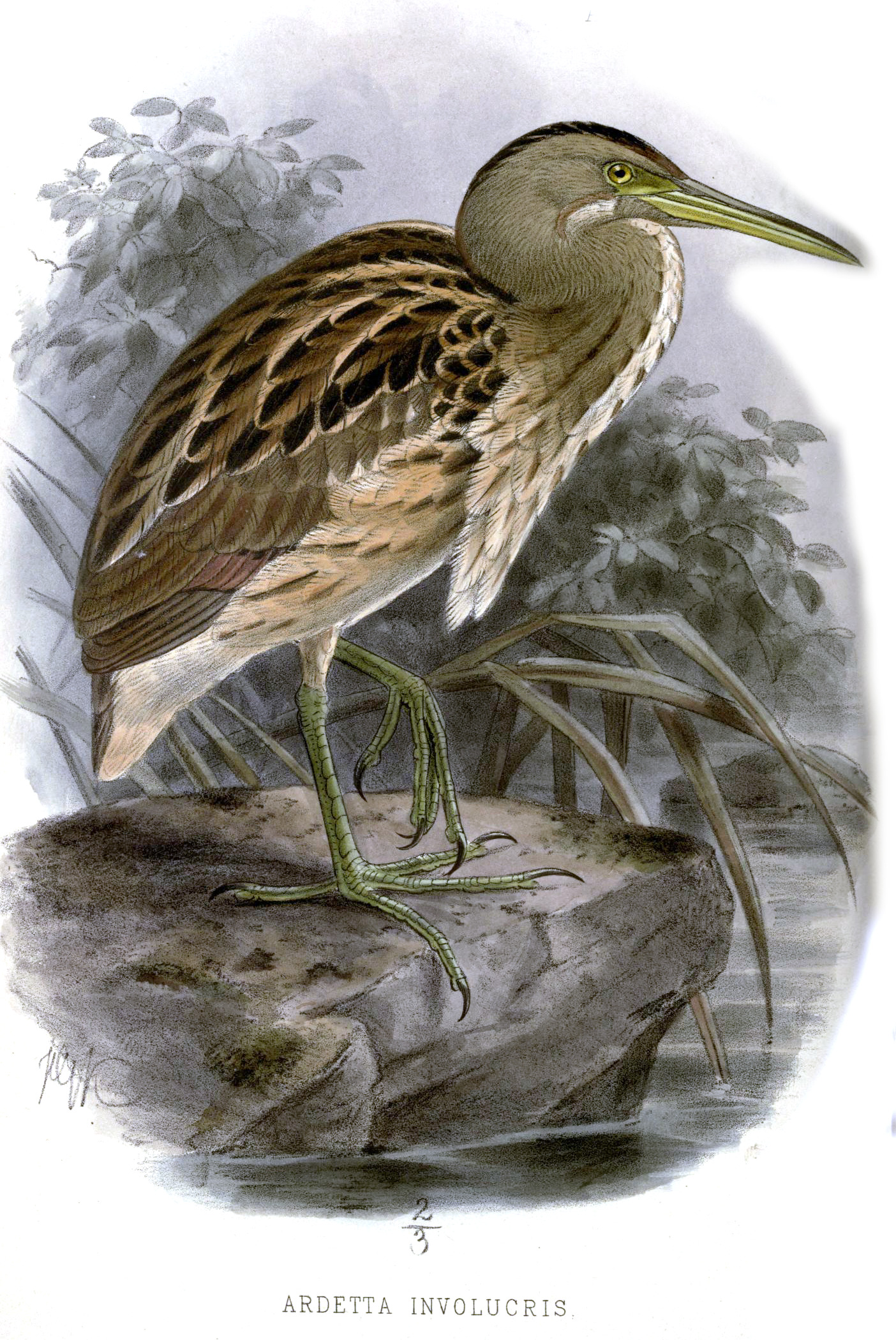

Stripe-backed bitterns are very small, averaging from 28 to 35 cm in length. Their pale brown back is ornamented with both black and yellowish-beige streaks, the latter also running along their broad wings. The colour patterns on their back complements the ones on their wings as to suppress obvious contrast between the two. Black stripes continue their way on the darker brown crown, while the underbelly is lighter brown and striped with white. As for the beak, the colour can differ from pale green to orange. This bittern species exhibits no sexual dimorphism, making it difficult to distinguish males from females. Furthermore, juveniles are not phenotypically described in the literature. Discriminating sex and age for this species has proved to be a challenge, so has the simple quest to even observe them in the wild. Stripe-backed bitterns tend to adopt an upright stance in which they "freeze" in place to observe their surroundings, making it more efficient to hunt their preys. When threatened, they respond by pointing their neck and bill skyward. This augments the difficulty to spot them easily. Following a solitary lifestyle, chances of finding them in groups are scarce but sights in pairs have been reported in the past.

=== Similar species ===
The stripe-backed bittern is easily confused with the least bittern. The most striking difference consist of the contrast between the dark coloured, completely streak less back of the least bittern, compared to its patterned wings. Least bitterns also differ by the rufous coloration on the sides of their head, also present on the neck of females.

== Distribution and habitat ==
=== Distribution ===
Displaying a disjunct yet wide distribution, stripe-backed bitterns are found on each side of the Andes. The northern population is distributed in large patches across South America, located in Colombia, Venezuela, Guyana, Suriname, French Guiana and the island of Trinidad, while the southern population is found in central and southern South America; in Paraguay, Uruguay, Argentina, Chile, southern Brazil and Bolivia. In 2018 stripe-backed bitterns have also been confirmed to live in northeastern Ecuador, as well as in southeastern Peru.

=== Habitat ===
Freshwater sources are the favoured habitat for stripe-backed bitterns. Ideal ecological niches consist of highly vegetated reed beds, swamps, rushes, lakes and mountain streams, marshes, and rice fields. Such aquatic environments are essential in food acquisition and for nest building.

== Behaviour ==
=== Diet ===
The main food source for stripe-backed bitterns, comprising half of their overall diet, are insects. They primarily consume insects from the orders Odonata, Coleoptera, Hemiptera and Orthoptera. The remaining half of their food intake includes small fishes, crustaceans, and arachnids. Stripe-backed bitterns are diurnal birds, with activities like hunting occurring either early in the morning or in the afternoon, and rest at noon and at sunset. They have been recorded to feed both alone and in pairs. Night feeding has also been reported, but only scarcely.

=== Reproduction ===
The reproductive cycle and breeding details of stripe-backed bitterns have not been extensively studied, and much of it is still unknown. Stripe-backed bitterns makes small nests of tightly bound reeds and stems, which are found above water level, among reeds. Incubation period for eggs is unknown, and breeding seasons appear to vary widely based on location.

=== Eggs ===
Stripe-backed bitterns have distinctly coloured eggs compared to others in the heron family. Ardeidae typically produce eggs of either elliptical or spherical shape, which are often pale blue in colour. The translucent layer of their eggs, combining the commonly called cone and palisade layers, allows a glimpse into the blue or white inner shell. The eggs of stripe-backed bitterns, uniquely, exhibit pale blue cone and palisade layers, covered by an outer translucent green layer. Although recurrent observations and descriptions have been published, the evolutionary explanation for such a unique egg coloration within the Ardeidae bird family has not yet been determined.

=== Vocalization ===
Sounds have been elaborately described and are sometimes the best way to determine the presence of stripe-backed bitterns, emitting calls through distinct, low-pitched ooks, or through gargling. Territorial or warning vocalizations consist of four low-pitched short "huu" or "ook" notes, followed by a second type of vocalization; a faster and higher-pitched "g'u'u'u'a'a" gargle.

== Conservation Status ==
This bittern is considered to be of least concern due to its wide range and its large, stable population. Stripe-backed bitterns do not receive much conservation efforts, nor do they constitute a priority for outreach education programs.
