= James Francis Stephens =

English entomologist and naturalist (1792–1852)

- Born: James Francis Stephens; 16 September 1792; Shoreham-by-Sea, West Sussex
- Died: 22 December 1852 (aged 60)
- Scientific career
- Author abbrev. (zoology): Stephens

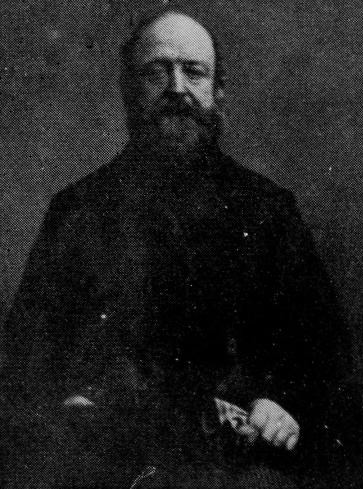
Portrait reproduced from a Daguerreotype

James Francis Stephens (16 September 1792 – 22 December 1852) was an English entomologist and naturalist. He is known for his 12 volume Illustrations of British Entomology (1846) and the Manual of British Beetles (1839).

== Early life ==
Stephens was born in Shoreham-by-Sea and studied at Christ's Hospital. His father was a navy captain William James Stephens (d. 1799) and his mother was Mary Peck (later Mrs Dallinger). He went to school at the Blue Coat School, Hertford and later at Christ's Hospital, London. He was then sent to study under Shute Barrington (1734–1826), the bishop of Durham in 1800. He left in 1807 and worked as a clerk in the Admiralty office, Somerset House, from 1807 to 1845 thanks to his uncle Admiral Stephens.

== Entomology ==
Stephens took an interest in natural history even as a schoolboy. He wrote a manuscript Catalogue of British Animals in 1808. He was elected fellow of the Linnean Society on 17 February 1815, and of the Zoological Society of London in 1826. From 1815 to 1825 he took a great interest in ornithology and contributed to the work of George Shaw (1751–1813). He was granted leave from office to assist William Elford Leach in 1818 to arrange the insect collection at the British Museum. He returned to the Admiralty but troubles with his superiors led him to retire early leading to loss of part of his pension. He then worked unpaid in the British Museum until his death and described as many as 2800 British insect species. He often used a pocket lens rather than a microscope and used a killing bottle with crushed laurel leaves rather than pinning specimens directly as was the practice then.

In 1833, he was a founder of what became the Royal Entomological Society of London. Stephens made a large insect collection, which included many type specimens. In 1822 he married Sarah, daughter of a Captain Roberts. Their children died young. Stephens died at Kennington on 22 December 1852 and was survived by his wife. After his death his insect collection was purchased by the British Museum. His library was bought by Henry Tibbats Stainton (1822–1892) who continued to keep Stephen's tradition of keeping the books available to other entomologists on Wednesday evenings. Stainton also published a catalogue of these books Bibliotheca Stephensiana (1853).

== Works ==
Stephens was the author of

- General zoology, or Systematic natural history London, Printed for G. Kearsley in part with George Shaw and sole author of the last 6 volumes of the 16 volumes after the death of George Shaw (1800–1826) - I-II Mammalia (1800), III- Amphibia (1802), Pisces (1803–4), VI Insecta (1806), VII-VIII Aves (1809–120, IX-XIV, pt. 1. Aves (J. F. Stephens alone) (1815–26), XIV, pt. 2 General index to the zoology by G. Shaw and J. F. Stephens (1826)
- Nomenclature of British Insects: Being a Compendious List of Such Species (1829).
- A systematic Catalogue of British insects: being an attempt to arrange all the hitherto discovered indigenous insects in accordance with their natural affinities. Containing also the references to every English writer on entomology, and to the principal foreign authors. With all the published British genera to the present time (1829).

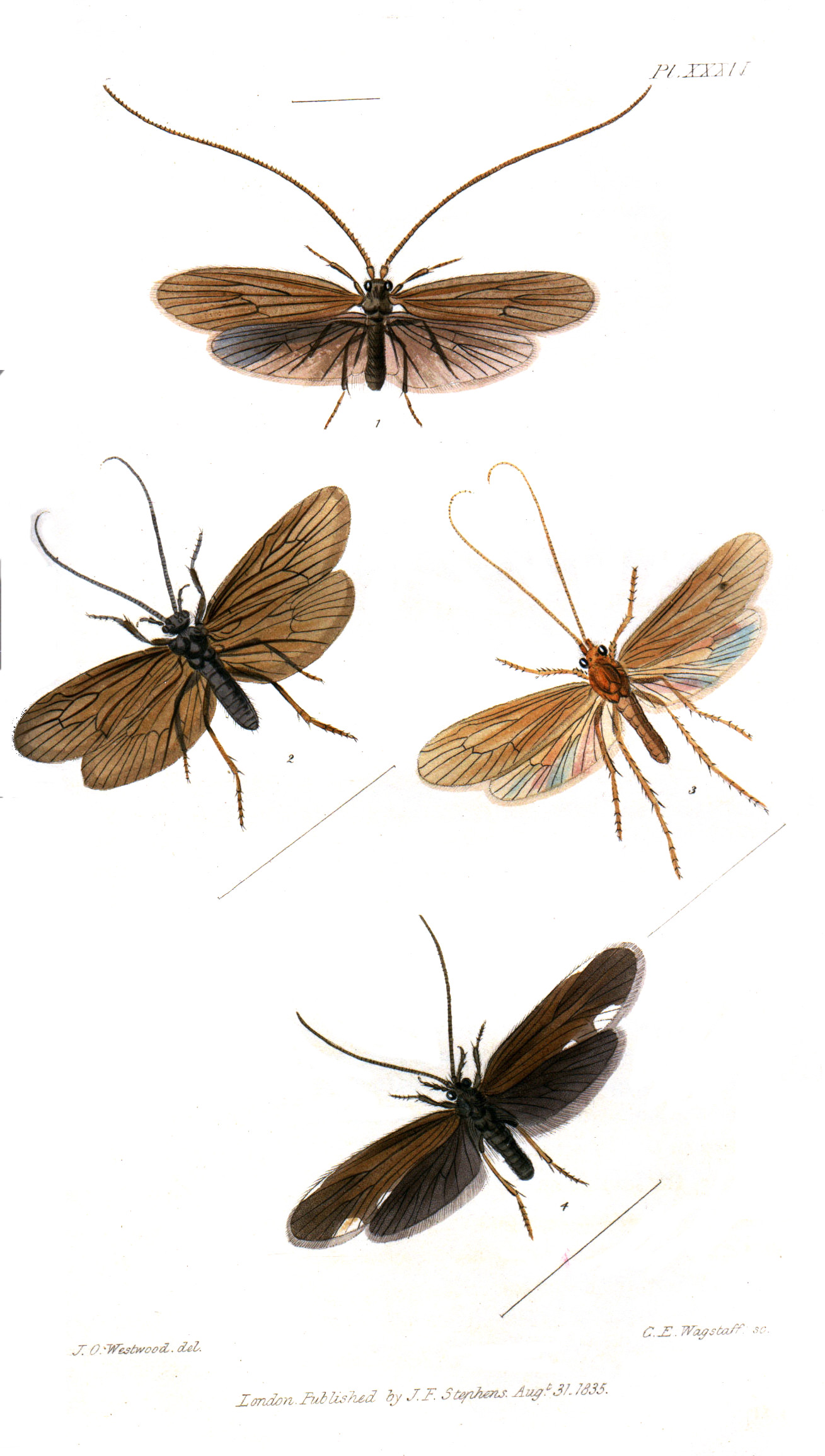
Illustration of Trichoptera from Stephen's British Entomology

- Illustrations of British Entomology; or, a synopsis of indigenous insects, containing their generic and specific distinctions; with an account of their metamorphoses, times of appearance, localities, food, and economy, as far as practicable. In ten volumes. (1828–1846). This work, following an older system of classification, consists of 7 volumes of Mandibulata (insects with chewing mouthparts/mandibles), 4 volumes of Haustellata (insects with sucking mouthparts, such as the Lepidopteran haustellum), and 1 supplementary volume. The plates are coloured by hand, after drawings by C.M. Curtis and John Obadiah Westwood

== Disputes ==
Stephens reported that James Rennie (1787–1867) pirated his illustrations in his 1832 Conspectus of the Butterflies and Moths Found in Britain and went to court. He however lost and most of his earnings from his book were lost to legal fees. Stephen's Illustrations of British Entomology, often entitled simply British Entomology was in immediate competition with John Curtis' British Entomology (1824–1839). This gave rise to an acrimonious dispute which split the British entomological establishment into opposing factions for over thirty years. They were never reconciled despite Stephen's close friend John Obadiah Westwood's attempt to heal the rift.

== Charles Darwin ==
While at the University of Cambridge, the student Charles Darwin became an enthusiastic insect collector. He sent Stephens records of the rarer insects he had captured, and was delighted when Illustrations of British entomology gave him credit for capturing insects described in 33 entries, quoting his words in all but two of the cases. Darwin recalled in his autobiography "No poet ever felt more delight at seeing his first poem published than I did at seeing in Stephen's Illustrations of British Insects the magic words, 'captured by C. Darwin, Esq.' ". The closest wording as published actually appeared slightly differently, as "captured by the Rev. F. W. Hope and C. Darwin, Esq., in North Wales" and "Taken in North Wales by C. Darwin, Esq.".
