= H. australis =

H. australis may refer to:

- Haageocereus australis, the Quisco De La Costa De Aric, a cactus species endemic to southern Peru and northern Chile
- Hemiandra australis, a shrub species in the genus Hemiandra found in Australia
- Hoya australis, the waxvine or common waxflower, a plant species found in Australia

== See also ==
- Australis (disambiguation)
