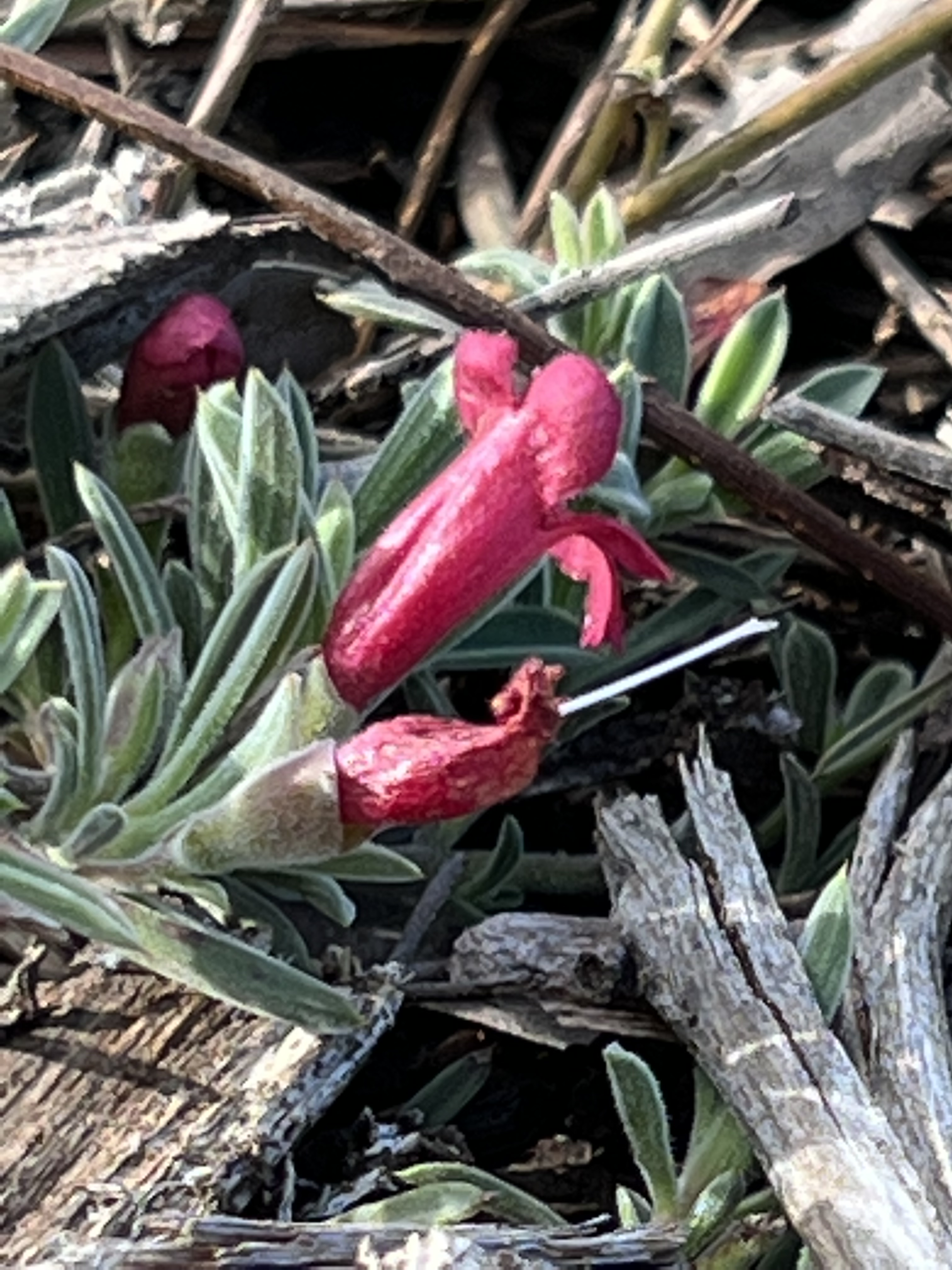

Scientific classification
- Kingdom: Plantae
- Clade: Tracheophytes
- Clade: Angiosperms
- Clade: Eudicots
- Clade: Asterids
- Order: Lamiales
- Family: Lamiaceae
- Genus: Hemiandra
- Species: H. gardneri

Binomial name
- Hemiandra gardneri O.H.Sarg.

= Hemiandra gardneri =

Red snakebush

Species of flowering plant

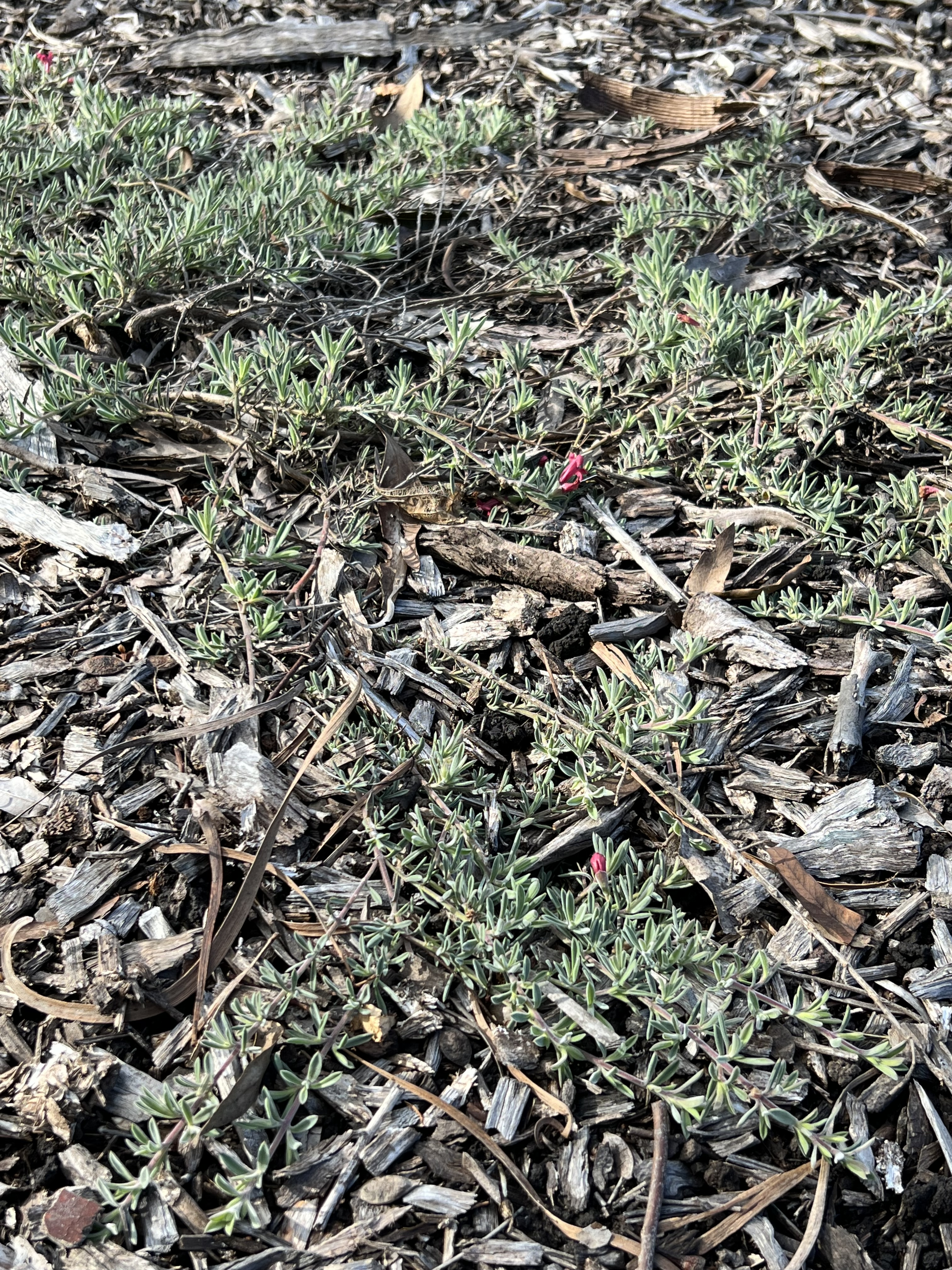
Habit

Hemiandra gardneri, commonly known as red snakebush, is a flowering plant in the family Lamiaceae and is endemic to Western Australia. It is a prostrate, trailing plant with greyish foliage and mostly red flowers.

== Description ==
Hemiandra gardneri is a prostrate, perennial mat forming shrub growing up to 0.1–0.2 m (3.9 in – 7.9 in) high, 0.2 m (7.9 in) wide and stems put 40 cm (16 in) long. The leaves are linear to linear oblong-lance shaped, green or greyish, up to 20 mm (0.79 in) long and 5 mm (0.20 in) wide, covered in short hairs and pointed at the apex. The red to dark pink flowers are borne usually in clusters near the end of stems. The fused corolla tube petals about 14 mm (0.55 in) long, 2 lipped, three lower lobes, 2 upper lobes and anthers protruding a short distance from the corolla. The calyx is bell-shaped, hairy, 5 mm (0.20 in) long and two lipped. Flowering occurs from August to October.

== Taxonomy and naming ==
Hemiandra gardneri was first formally described in 1927 by Oswald Hewlett Sargent and the description was published in Journal of Botany, British and Foreign. The specific epithet (gardneri) is in honour of Charles Gardner.

== Distribution and habitat ==
Red snakebush grows on deep sand in heath, scrub and hills north of Watheroo.

== Conservation status ==
Hemiandra gardneri is listed as "endangered" under the Environment Protection and Biodiversity Conservation Act 1999.
