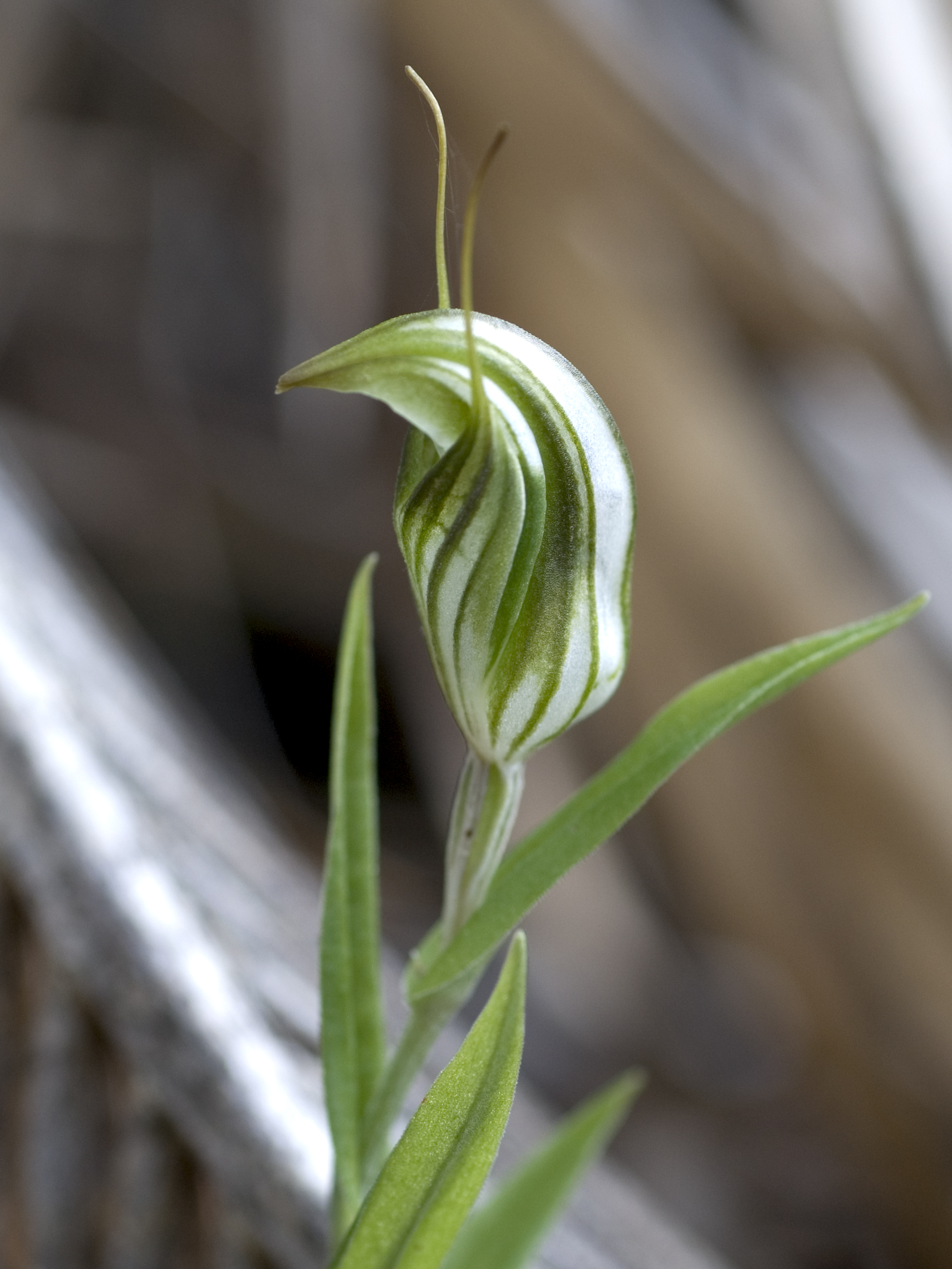

Scientific classification
- Kingdom: Plantae
- Clade: Tracheophytes
- Clade: Angiosperms
- Clade: Monocots
- Order: Asparagales
- Family: Orchidaceae
- Subfamily: Orchidoideae
- Tribe: Cranichideae
- Genus: Pterostylis
- Species: P. scabra

Binomial name
- Pterostylis scabra Lindl.

Synonyms
- Diplodium scabrum (Lindl.) D.L.Jones & M.A.Clem.; Pterostylis constricta O.H.Sarg.; Pterostylis reflexa var. constricta (O.H.Sarg.) Ewart & Jean White; Pterostylis scabra Lindl. var. scabra

= Pterostylis scabra =

Green-veined shell orchid

Species of orchid

Pterostylis scabra, commonly known as green-veined shell orchid, is a species of orchid endemic to the south-west of Western Australia. As with similar orchids, the flowering plants differ from those which are not flowering. The non-flowering plants have a rosette of leaves but the flowering plants lack a rosette and have a single flower with leaves on the flowering spike. This greenhood has a white flower with green and pale brownish-fawn stripes and a long, curved protruding labellum. It is found in inland areas between Kalbarri and Esperance.

== Description ==
Pterostylis scabra is a terrestrial, perennial, deciduous, herb with an underground tuber and when not flowering, a rosette of leaves lying flat on the ground, each leaf 10–40 mm (0.4–2 in) long and 2–3 mm (0.08–0.1 in) wide. Flowering plants have a single flower 30–40 mm (1–2 in) long and 10–12 mm (0.4–0.5 in) wide borne on a flowering stem 60–180 mm (2–7 in) high. The flowers are white with green and pale brownish-fawn stripes. The dorsal sepal and petals are fused, forming a hood or "galea" over the column, the dorsal sepal curving forward with a short pointed tip. The lateral sepals are erect with a small gap between them and the galea and have thread-like ends 30–35 mm (1.2–1.4 in) long. The labellum is long, narrow and down-curved, protruding prominently above the sinus between the lateral sepals. Flowering occurs from May to August.

== Taxonomy and naming ==
Pterostylis scabra was first formally described in 1840 by John Lindley and the description was published in the A Sketch of the Vegetation of the Swan River Colony. The specific epithet (scabra) is a Latin word meaning "rough", "scurfy" or "scabby", referring to the rough surface of the labellum.

== Distribution and habitat ==
Green-veined shell orchid is found in inland areas between Kalbarri and Esperance in the Avon Wheatbelt, Esperance Plains, Geraldton Sandplains, Jarrah Forest and Mallee biogeographic regions.

== Conservation ==
Pterostylis scabra is classified as "not threatened" by the Western Australian Government Department of Parks and Wildlife. It usually grows in moist, shaded areas, often near temporary streams but also grows in woodland and on granite outcrops.
