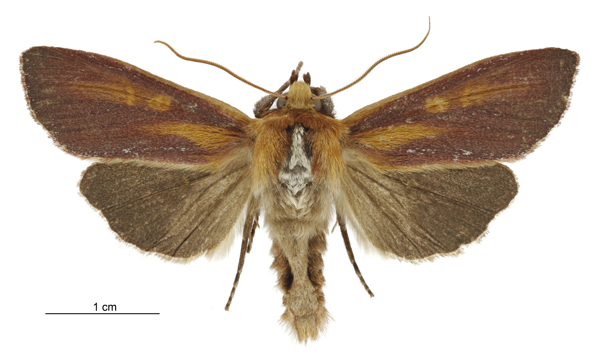
- Male
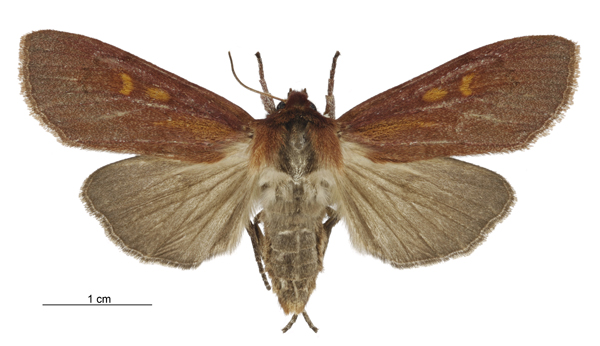
- Female

Scientific classification
- Kingdom: Animalia
- Phylum: Arthropoda
- Clade: Pancrustacea
- Class: Insecta
- Order: Lepidoptera
- Superfamily: Noctuoidea
- Family: Noctuidae
- Genus: Ichneutica
- Species: I. purdii

Binomial name
- Ichneutica purdii (Fereday, 1883)

Synonyms
- Leucania purdii Fereday, 1883; Leucania purdei (Fereday, 1883); Alysina purdii (Fereday, 1883); Tmetolophota purdii (Fereday, 1883)

= Ichneutica purdii =

Species of moth endemic to New Zealand

Ichneutica purdii, the orange astelia wainscot, is a moth of the family Noctuidae. It is endemic to New Zealand. It can be found throughout the main islands of New Zealand. I. purdii is a relatively large, colourful moth, unlikely to be confused with any other endemic moth species in New Zealand. The larvae of this moth feed at night on species of Astelia. During the day they shelter in the interior of the plant. When fully grown the larvae can reach a length of approximately 48mm. The larvae are ocherous in colour with a pink flush with line markings but when ready to pupate these markings fade and the larvae take on a light golden hue with a rosy tinge to its rear segments. The deep wine coloured pupa is enclosed in a slight cocoon, with this being constructed below the soil, amongst debris or alternatively within a hollow stick. The adult moths are on the wing from October to March. Although this moth is found throughout the main islands of New Zealand it is more frequent in the south of New Zealand at higher altitudes of up to 1200m.

== Taxonomy ==
This species was described by R. W. Fereday in 1883 from a specimen collected by Alex. Purdie (the son of Alexander Callender Purdie) in a field near Fairfield. Fereday originally named the species Leucania purdii in honour of the collector of the type specimen. George Hudson discussed and illustrated this species in 1898 and again in 1928. On both of these occasions Hudson used the name Leucania purdii when discussing the species. In 1929 A. V. Chappell gave a detailed account of the life history of the species. Hudson again used the name Leucania purdii when he illustrated this moth in his 1939 publication A Supplement to the Butterflies and Moths of New Zealand. J. S. Dugdale transferred this species to the genus Tmetolophota in 1971. Dugdale confirmed this placement in 1988.

In 2019 Robert J. B. Hoare undertook a major review of New Zealand noctuids. Hoare, having inspected the holotype specimen of this species, placed it within the genus Ichneutica.

== Description ==
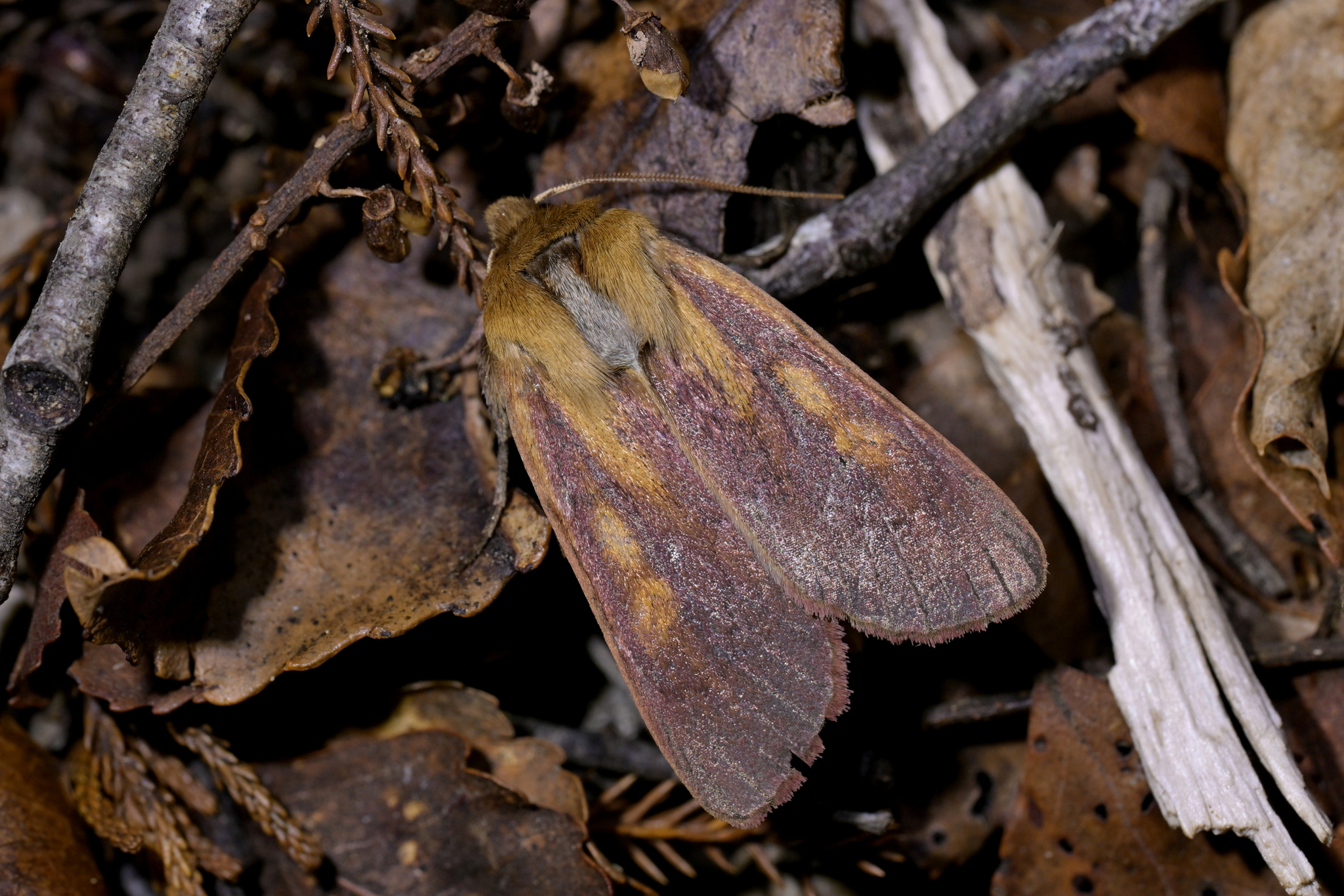
Live I. purdii.

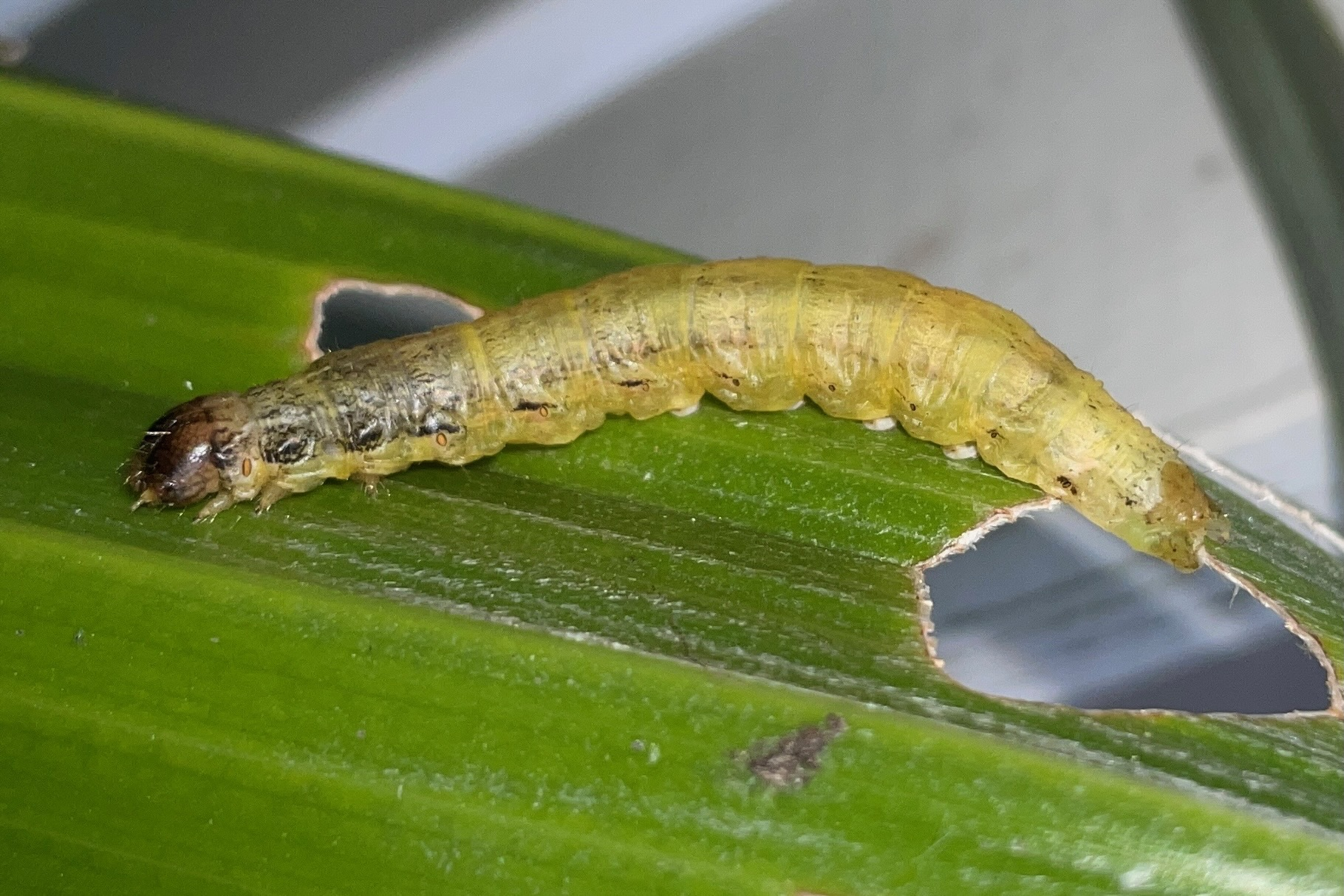
Larva of I. purdii.

The eggs of this species are spherical in shape though slightly flattened both above and below. Eggs can range in colour from light blue green, to pale brown with a dark central spot to black, again, with a darker spot in the centre.

When hatched the larvae are approximately 3mm in length and are coloured off white. When fully grown the larvae are ocherous in colour with a pink flush with line markings but when ready to pupate these markings fade and the larvae take on a light golden hue with a rosy tinge to its rear segments. The larvae can reach a length of approximately 48mm. Pupa are deep wine coloured.

Fereday first described the adult male holotype specimen of this species as follows:

Head and thorax dark pinkish-ochreous-yellow, darkest in front; abdomen paler and greyish at base. Primaries above dark pinkish cedar colour, a dash of ochreous-yellow occupying the areolet between the submedian nervure and the third median nervule, the dash being very bright at the base and fading towards the posterior angle; a dash of the same colour commencing broadly in the middle of the discoidal cell, extending along the areolet between the first discoidal and lower subcostal nervules, and narrowing towards and vanishing near the exterior margin; a similar dash extending along two-thirds of the costa from the base of the wing; cilia, basal half ochreous-yellow, exterior whitish-ochreous. Primaries below greyish-ochreous with a pinkish tinge, costal part more ochreous, exterior area more grey; cilia as above. Secondaries above dark fuscous, paler at the base; cilia same as of primaries. Secondaries below greyish-ochreous, the exterior third more greyish, preceded by a darker greyish transverse narrow band running parallel with the exterior margin; discocellular spot greyish rather indistinct; cilia as above.

I. purdii is variable in appearance but can be identified by the deep pink colour of its forewings with markings in orange including an orange line along the fold of the forewings. The orange markings can be variable in length. The hindwings are blackish brown in colour. The male adult of the species has a wingspan of between 39 and 50 mm while the female has a slightly larger wingspan of 45–55 mm.

== Geographic range ==
I. purdii is endemic to New Zealand and can be found throughout the North, South and Stewart Islands. It can be found at an altitude range of between sea level and 1200m although it is more commonly found in the south of the country and at the higher end of the altitude limit.

== Host species ==
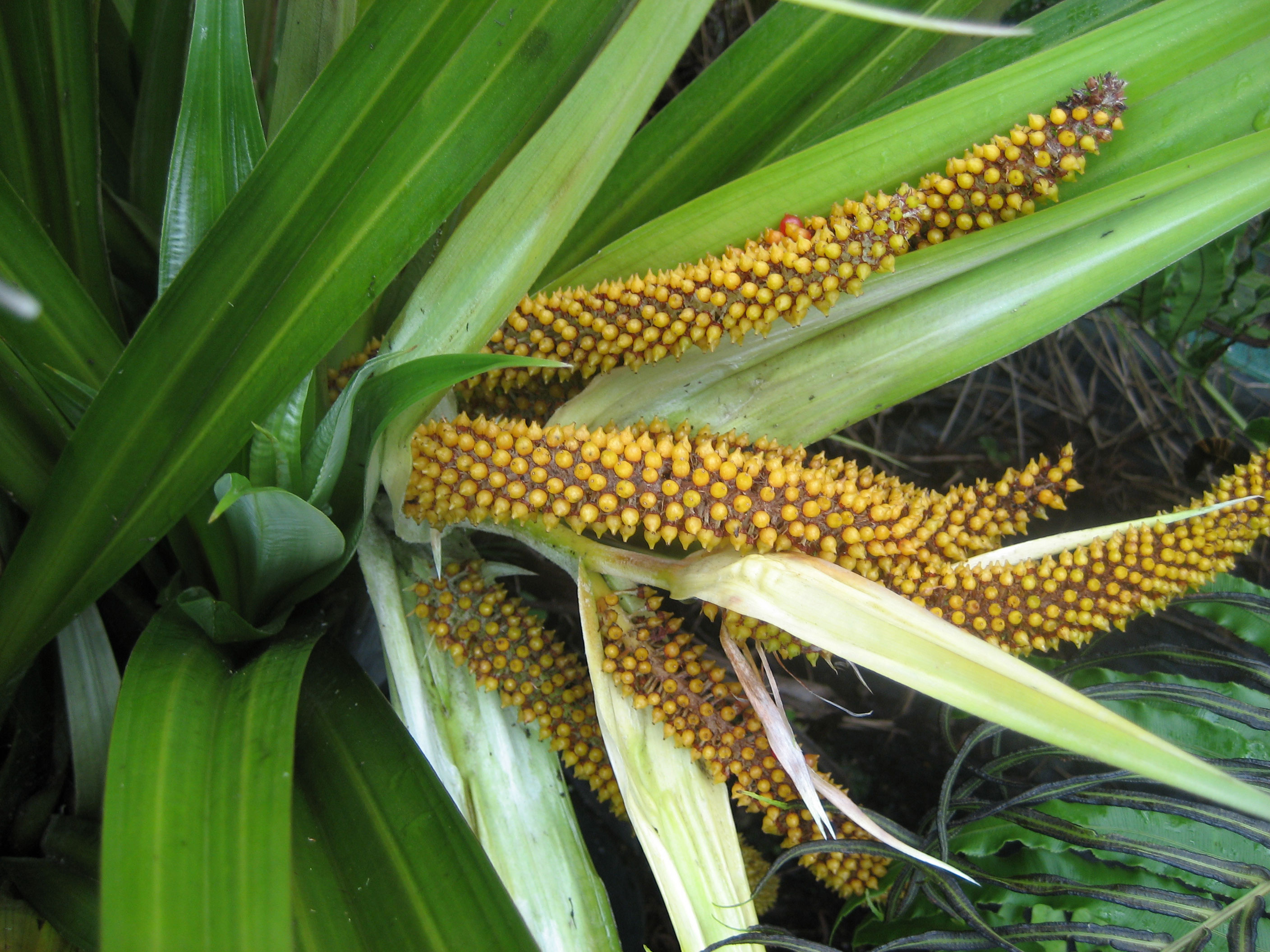
Astelia hastata, a host species of I. purdii caterpillars

The larvae feed on Astelia and Cordyline species including A. hastata and A. grandis. In captivity larvae have been raised on Cordyline australis. Younger larvae eat grooves in its host plant leaves while older larvae can eat through the leaves completely.

== Behaviour ==
When disturbed the larvae of this species drops and rolls into a ball. Adult moths are on the wing from October to March and are attracted to light. They have been collected via a mercury vapour light trap.

== Life history ==
The eggs are laid in patches. Once hatched the larvae are nocturnal, spending the day sheltering in the middle of their host plant. The pupa is enclosed in a slight cocoon with this being constructed below the soil, amongst debris or alternatively within a hollow stick. The adult moths are on the wing from October to March. Hudson was of the opinion that the perfect adult was obtained in December until March.
