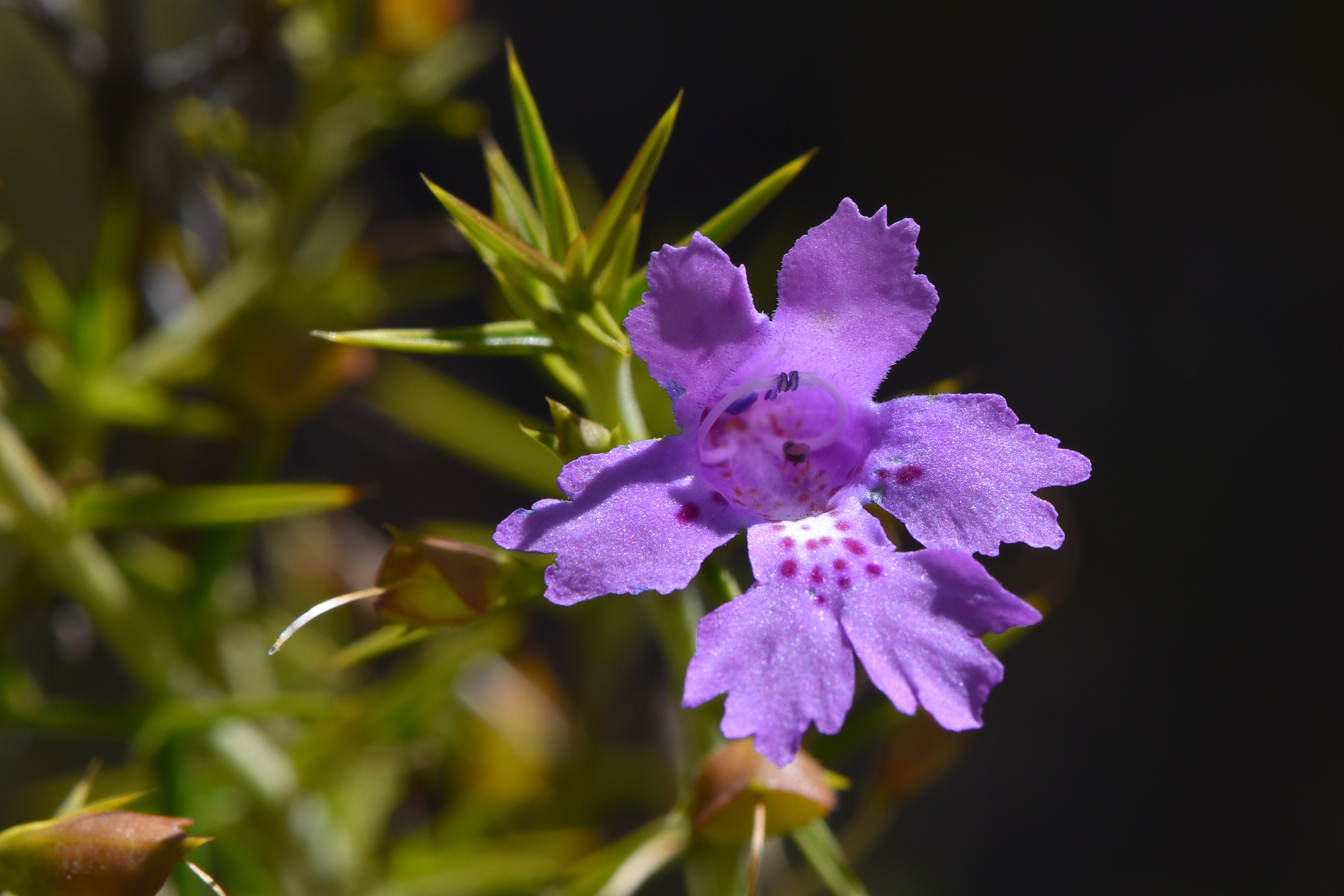

Scientific classification
- Kingdom: Plantae
- Clade: Tracheophytes
- Clade: Angiosperms
- Clade: Eudicots
- Clade: Asterids
- Order: Lamiales
- Family: Lamiaceae
- Genus: Hemiandra
- Species: H. linearis

Binomial name
- Hemiandra linearis Benth.

Synonyms
- Hemiandra longifolia Bartl.; Hemiandra pungens var. grandiflora Benth.; Hemiandra pungens var. linearis (Benth.) Ostenf. nom. illeg.; Hemiandra pungens var. linearis (Benth.) Domin isonym

= Hemiandra linearis =

Speckled snakebush

Species of flowering plant

Hemiandra linearis, commonly known as speckled snakebush, is a species of prostrate to ascending shrub that is endemic to the south-west of Western Australia.

== Description ==
Hemiandra linearis is a prostrate to ascending shrub that typically grows to a height of up to 60 cm (24 in). It has leaves 15–25 mm (0.59–0.98 in) long and 1–5 mm (0.039–0.197 in) wide arranged in opposite pairs. There are four sepals joined at the base with lobes 6–10 mm (0.24–0.39 in) long. The petals are 15–25 mm (0.59–0.98 in) long and white, cream-coloured, purple, lilac or violet with dots or stripes near the base. Flowering occurs from October to November or December.

== Taxonomy ==
Hemiandra linearis was formally described in 1837 by George Bentham in Stephan Endlicher's Enumeratio plantarum quas in Novae Hollandiae ora austro-occidentali ad fluvium Cygnorum et in sinu Regis Georgii collegit Carolus Liber Baro de Hügel from material collected near the Swan River by Charles von Hügel.

== Distribution and habitat ==
This hemiandra grows in sand in the Avon Wheatbelt, Geraldton Sandplains, Jarrah Forest and Swan Coastal Plain biogeographic regions in the south-west of Western Australia.

== Conservation status ==
This species is classified as "not threatened" by the Department of Environment and Conservation (Western Australia).
