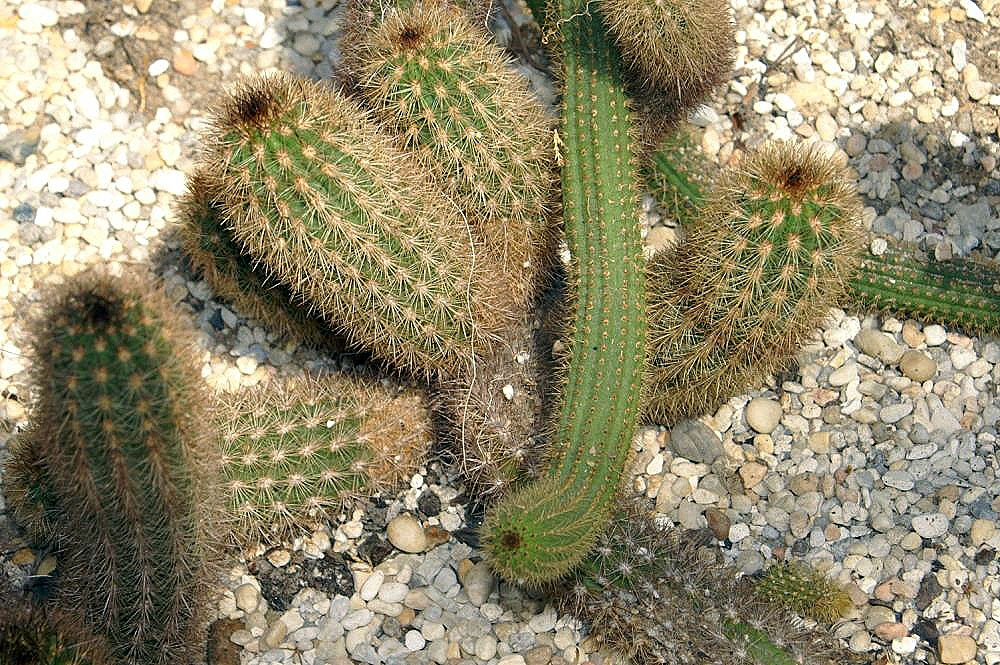

Conservation status
- Least Concern (IUCN 3.1)

Scientific classification
- Kingdom: Plantae
- Clade: Tracheophytes
- Clade: Angiosperms
- Clade: Eudicots
- Order: Caryophyllales
- Family: Cactaceae
- Subfamily: Cactoideae
- Genus: Haageocereus
- Species: H. acranthus

Binomial name
- Haageocereus acranthus (Vaupel) Backeb. 1933

Synonyms
- Binghamia acrantha (Vaupel) Britton & Rose 1920; Cereus acranthus Vaupel 1913; Echinopsis acrantha (Vaupel) Anceschi & Magli 2021

= Haageocereus acranthus =

Species of cactus

Haageocereus acranthus is a species of Haageocereus found in Peru.

== Description ==
Haageocereus acranthus grows in a columnar shape with arching or upright, sparsely branched shoots and reaches heights of 1 to 2 meters with diameters of up to 8 cm (3.1 in). There are twelve to 14 ribs, which are divided into tubercles near the shoot tip. The closely spaced areoles are yellow to dark brown. The usually single central spine, occasionally several are present, is directed downwards and up to 4 cm (1.6 in) long. The 20 to 30 yellow radial spines are up to 1 cm (0.39 in) long.

The greenish white flowers are 6 to 8 cm (2.4 to 3.1 in) long. The green fruits are spherical.

== Subspecies ==
Accepted subspecies:

Image	Subspecies	Distribution
	Haageocereus acranthus subsp. acranthus	Peru.
	Haageocereus acranthus subsp. backebergii N.Calderón	Peru.
	Haageocereus acranthus subsp. zonatus (Rauh & Backeb.) Ostolaza	Peru.

== Distribution ==
Haageocereus acranthus is widespread in the Peruvian regions of Ica and Lima at altitudes of 200 to 2700 meters.

== Taxonomy ==
The first description as Cereus acranthus was made in 1913 by Friedrich Karl Johann Vaupel. The specific epithet acranthus means 'pointy-flowered'. Curt Backeberg placed the species in the genus Haageocereus in 1936. Further nomenclature synonyms are Pilocereus acranthus K.Schum. ex Weberb. (1911) and Binghamia acrantha (Vaupel) Britton & Rose(1920, incorrect name ICBN article 11.4).
