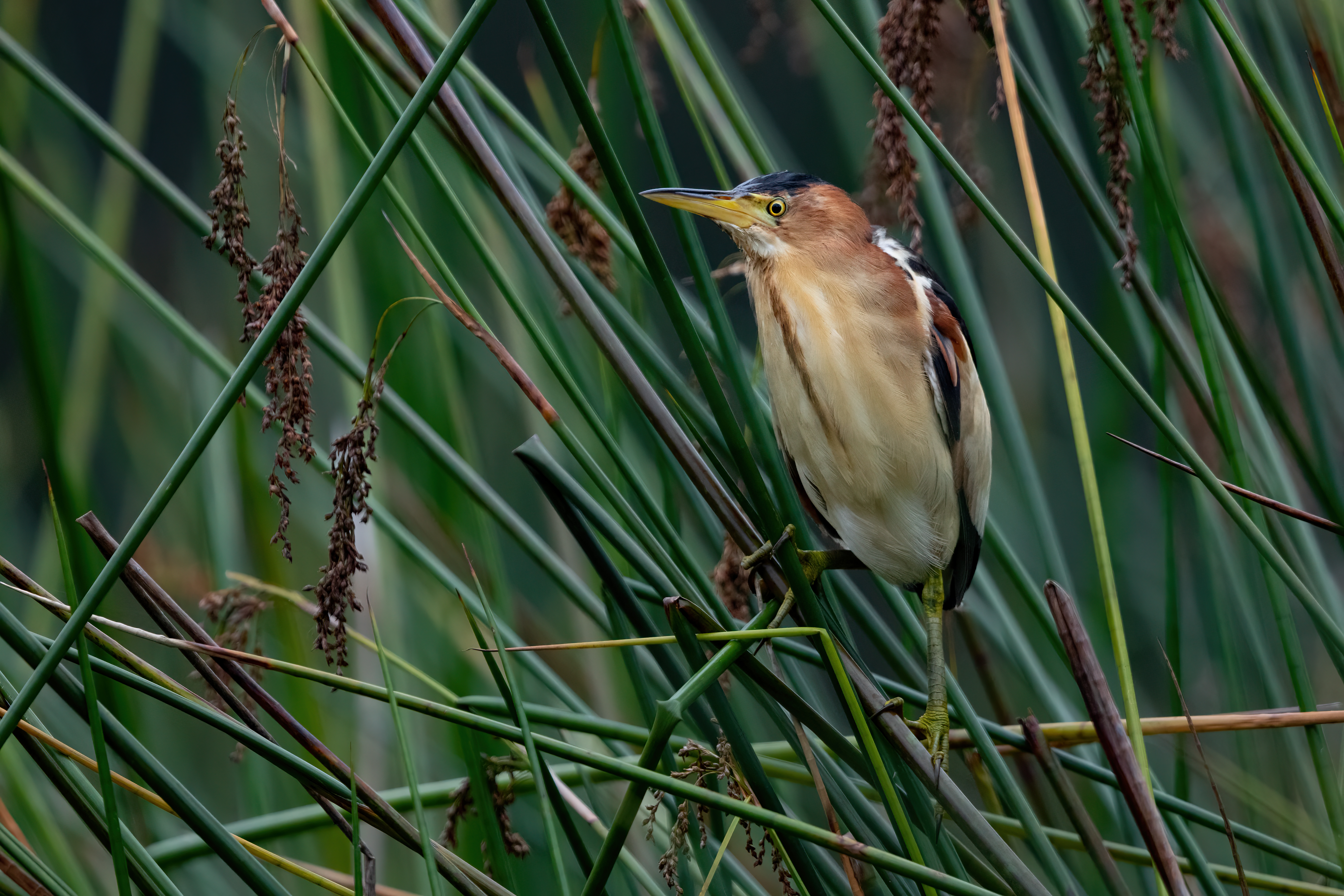
- Black-backed bittern (adult male)

Conservation status
- Least Concern (IUCN 3.1)

Scientific classification
- Kingdom: Animalia
- Phylum: Chordata
- Class: Aves
- Order: Pelecaniformes
- Family: Ardeidae
- Genus: Botaurus
- Species: B. dubius

Binomial name
- Botaurus dubius (Mathews, 1912)

Synonyms
- Ardea pusilla Vieillot, 1817; Ardetta pusilla Gould.; Ixobrychus minutus dubius Mathews, 1912; Ixobrychus minutus alisteri Mathews, 1913; Ixobrychus minutus queenslandicus Mathews, 1914; Ixobrychus minutus victoria Mathews, 1915; Ixobrychus novaezelandiae dubius

= Black-backed bittern =

Species of bird

The black-backed bittern (Botaurus dubius), also known as the black-backed least bittern or Australian little bittern, is a little-known species of heron in the family Ardeidae found in Australia and vagrant to southern New Guinea. Formerly lumped with the little bittern, it is one of the smallest herons in the world. This species was formerly placed in the genus Ixobrychus.

== Taxonomy ==
The bittern has sometimes been regarded as a subspecies of the little bittern (Botaurus minutus), or of the New Zealand bittern (Botaurus novaezelandiae). However, molecular evidence has shown it to be more closely related to the yellow bittern (Botaurus sinensis) than to the African and Palaearctic forms of the little bittern, and it is now recognised as a full species.

== Description ==
The species measures from 25 to 36 cm (9.8 to 14.2 in), has a total weight of 60–120 g (2.1–4.2 oz), averaging 84 g (3.0 oz). This is a very small bittern and one of the smallest herons in the world. The adult male has largely black upperparts, including a black cap, while the underparts, as well as the neck, breast and the sides of the head, are rich chestnut. There are large buff patches on the shoulders, conspicuous in flight. The female is duller, brown and streaked on back and crown; immature birds are similar. The irides are yellow, the bill is yellow with a black culmen, and the feet and legs greenish-yellow.

== Distribution and movements ==
=== Australia ===
In Australia the bittern is found in the south-east of the continent, with most records deriving from the Murray-Darling Basin, as well as patchily along the east coast, and in south-west Western Australia where it is locally common on the Swan Coastal Plain. Some scattered records are given from elsewhere, including coastal locations in the Kimberley region, the Top End, and the Torres Strait islands, with vagrants occasionally reaching Lord Howe Island and New Zealand.

Apart from records of vagrants, circumstantial evidence that at least part of the population makes long-distance seasonal migrations is that most sightings, and the highest reporting rates, of the bitterns in southern Australia occur in spring and summer, with the birds largely absent in autumn and winter. There are few breeding records from the Australian tropics.

=== New Guinea ===
In New Guinea the bittern is found seasonally in the reed beds of the Waigani Swamp near Port Moresby from November to April, only being reliably recorded elsewhere on the island from the lowlands of the Trans-Fly region. No firm breeding records are from New Guinea, though a specimen taken in the middle Fly River lagoons was of a bird ready to lay, indicating breeding in the Fly River marshes in September. The lack of good breeding records suggests that at least some birds in New Guinea are seasonal migrants from Australia.

=== New Caledonia ===
The bittern was sighted in New Caledonia in 2001, where it bred.

== Habitat ==
The birds are mainly found in freshwater wetlands, where they inhabit dense emergent vegetation of reeds and sedges, and inundated shrub thickets. They are also occasionally found in brackish and saline wetlands such as mangrove swamps, Juncus-dominated salt marsh and the wooded margins of coastal lagoons.

== Behaviour ==
Black-backed bitterns are solitary, secretive and seldom seen, mainly active at dusk or at night. They are skulkers of reed beds, walking in a crouched posture with head extended forward, crossing patches of open ground rapidly, stalking their prey at the water's edge. When alarmed they will assume the cryptic posture typical of many bitterns, standing still with the head and bill extended vertically upwards. Usually reluctant to fly, when flushed they will do so with retracted head and dangling legs, skimming low over the water and the wetland vegetation.

=== Breeding ===
The bitterns breed in spring and early summer, nesting in single pairs, or occasionally in loose colonies with the nests 15–30 m apart, in dense wetland vegetation. The nest is a platform of reeds and other plant matter, about 15–20 cm across and 10 cm thick, supported by the vertical stems of growing reeds, always situated over water and where there is overhead cover. The clutch usually comprises four to six matt white eggs, with an incubation period of about 21 days. The chicks are covered with orange-buff down and are fed by regurgitation by both parents. Young birds may start clambering in the reeds from 9–10 days old, taking their first flight when 25–30 days old, and remaining dependent on their parents for at least another 14 days.

=== Feeding ===
The birds feed mainly on aquatic invertebrates such as crustaceans and dragonfly larvae, sometimes small vertebrates such as fish and frogs. They hunt by waiting for potential prey animals to come within range of their bills, or by active stalking.

=== Voice ===
Vocalisations of the bittern are poorly known. Outside the breeding season the birds are usually silent, though they may utter a small range of low croaking or grunting sounds. During the breeding season the advertising call, a deep, low and monotonous croaking call, repeated at half-second intervals and said to be made only by the males, may be heard.

== Status and conservation ==
Black-backed bitterns are listed as Near Threatened nationally in Australia, and as Endangered in Victoria. The global population has been estimated to comprise about 5000 mature individuals, mainly within Australia, including a sub-population of more than 1000 individuals in south-western Western Australia. Threats include various ongoing wetland degradation factors such as salinisation, drainage and the diversion of water for irrigation, as well as the destruction of nesting habitat by inappropriate burning regimens.
