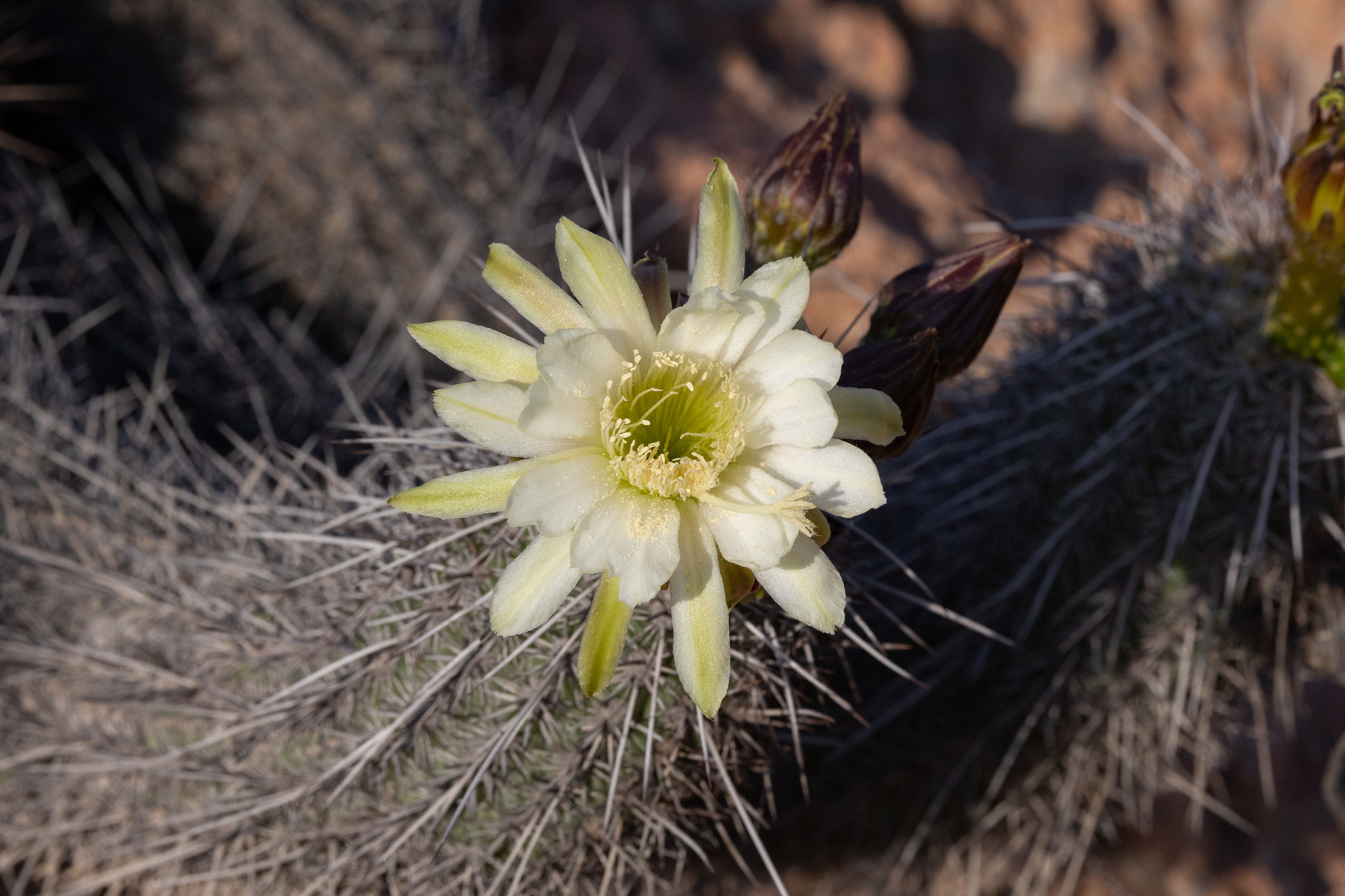

Conservation status
- Least Concern (IUCN 3.1)

Scientific classification
- Kingdom: Plantae
- Clade: Embryophytes
- Clade: Tracheophytes
- Clade: Spermatophytes
- Clade: Angiosperms
- Clade: Eudicots
- Order: Caryophyllales
- Family: Cactaceae
- Subfamily: Cactoideae
- Genus: Haageocereus
- Species: H. platinospinus

Binomial name
- Haageocereus platinospinus,

Synonyms
- Binghamia platinospina (Werderm. & Backeb.) Werderm. 1937; Borzicactus platinospinus (Werderm. & Backeb.) Borg 1937; Cereus platinospinus Werderm. & Backeb. 1931; Echinopsis platinospina (Werderm. & Backeb.) Anceschi & Magli2013; Echinopsis pluriflora (Rauh & Backeb.) Mayta 2015; Haageocereus platinospinus var. pluriflorus (Rauh & Backeb.) F.Ritter 1981; Haageocereus pluriflorus Rauh & Backeb. 1956 publ. 1957

= Haageocereus platinospinus =

Species of cactus

Haageocereus platinospinus is a species of Haageocereus found in Peru.

== Description ==
Haageocereus platinospinus grows with several creeping shoots that reach diameters of 5 to 8 cm (2.0 to 3.1 in). There are 13 to 15 ribs on which there are fairly large, elongated areoles. The light to dark brown thorns turn gray with age or become silvery white. The one to four strong, apical central spines are up to 7 cm (2.8 in) long. The ten to 13 radial spines are up to 1.5 cm (0.59 in) long.

The white flowers reach a length of up to 7 cm (2.8 in).

== Distribution ==
Haageocereus platinospinus is widespread in Peru in the Arequipa and Tacna regions at altitudes of 800 to 2650 meters.

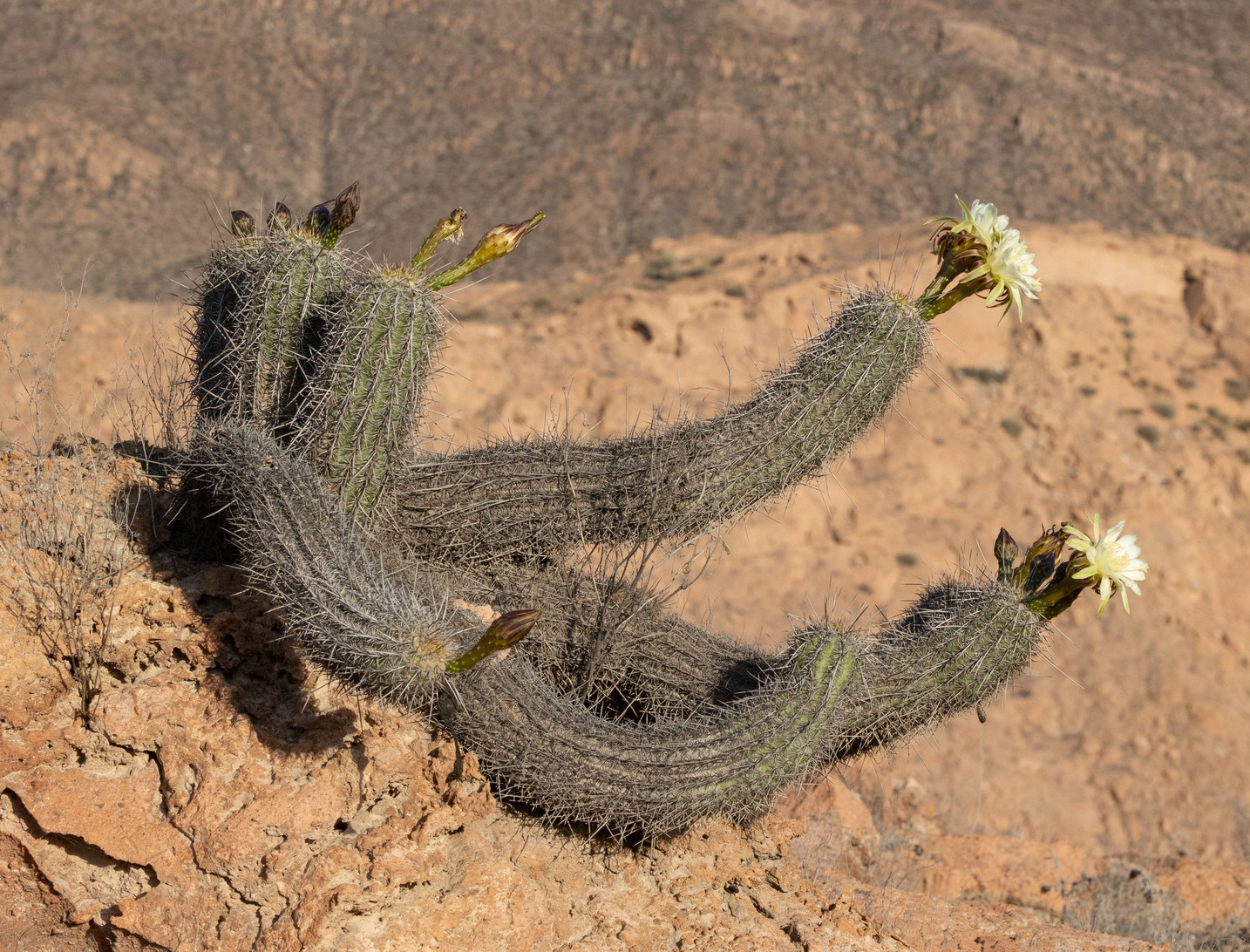
Plant blooming in Socosani, Peru

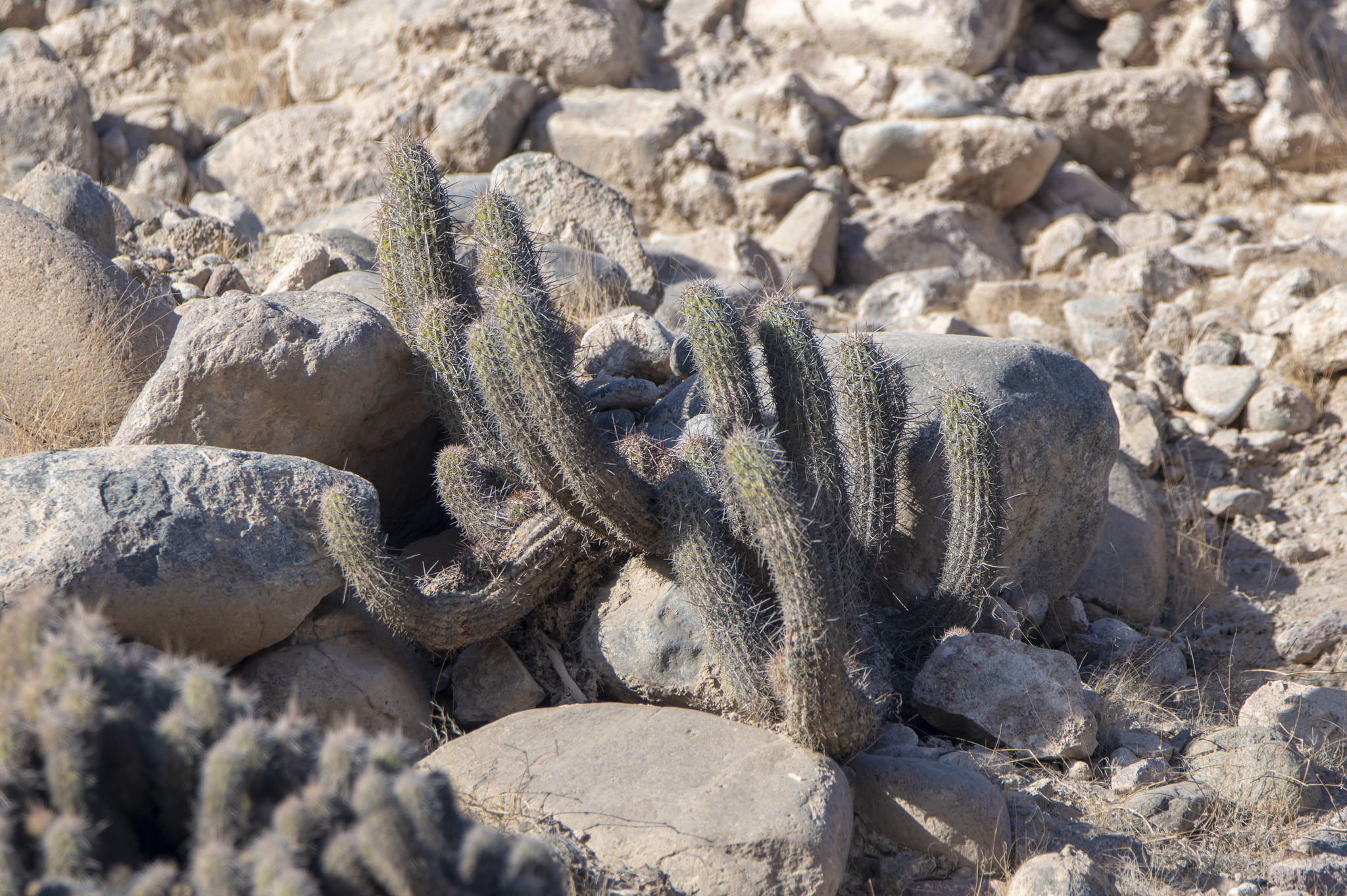
Habitat in Moquegua, Peru

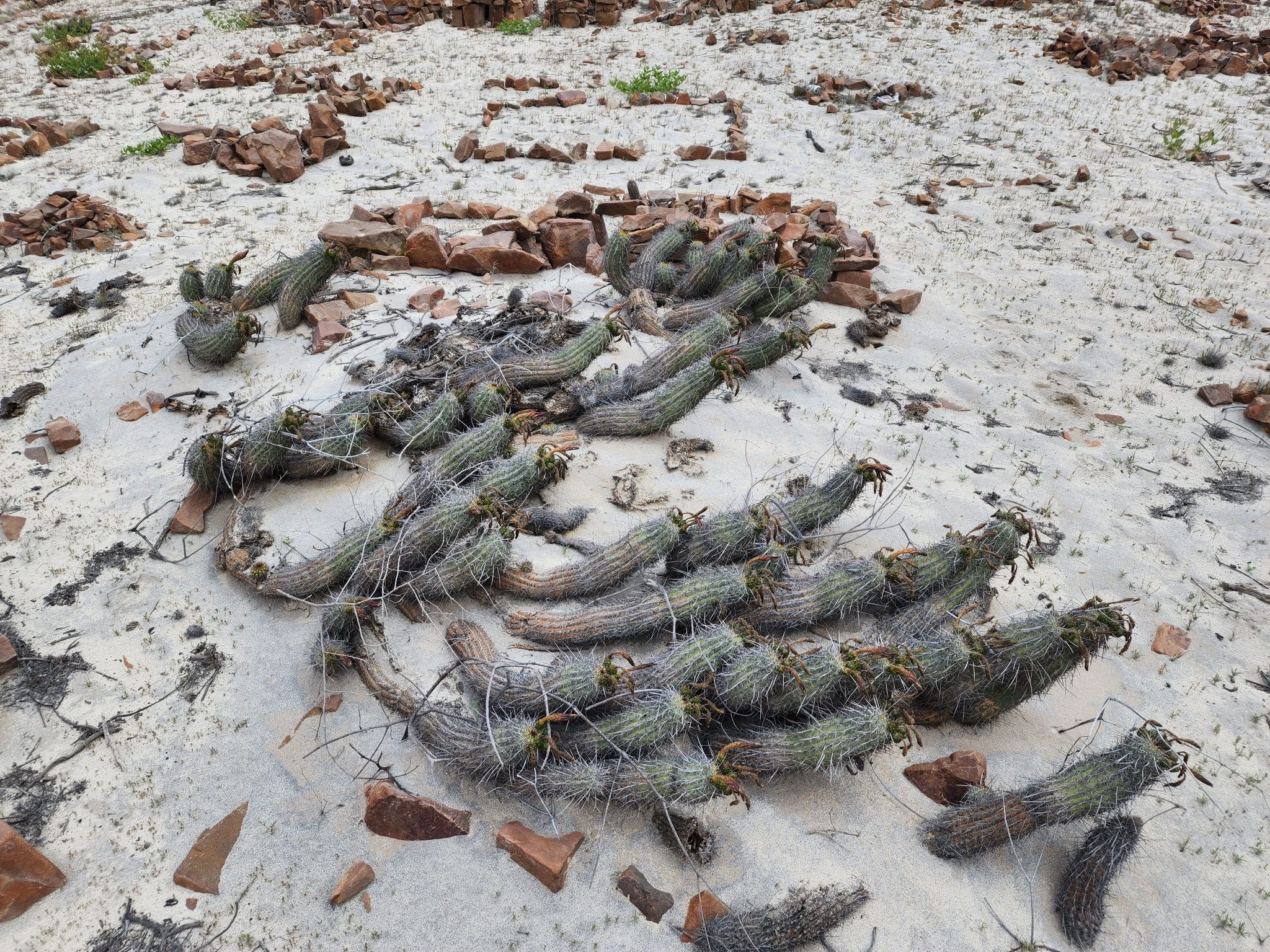
Habitat in Huajalando, Peru

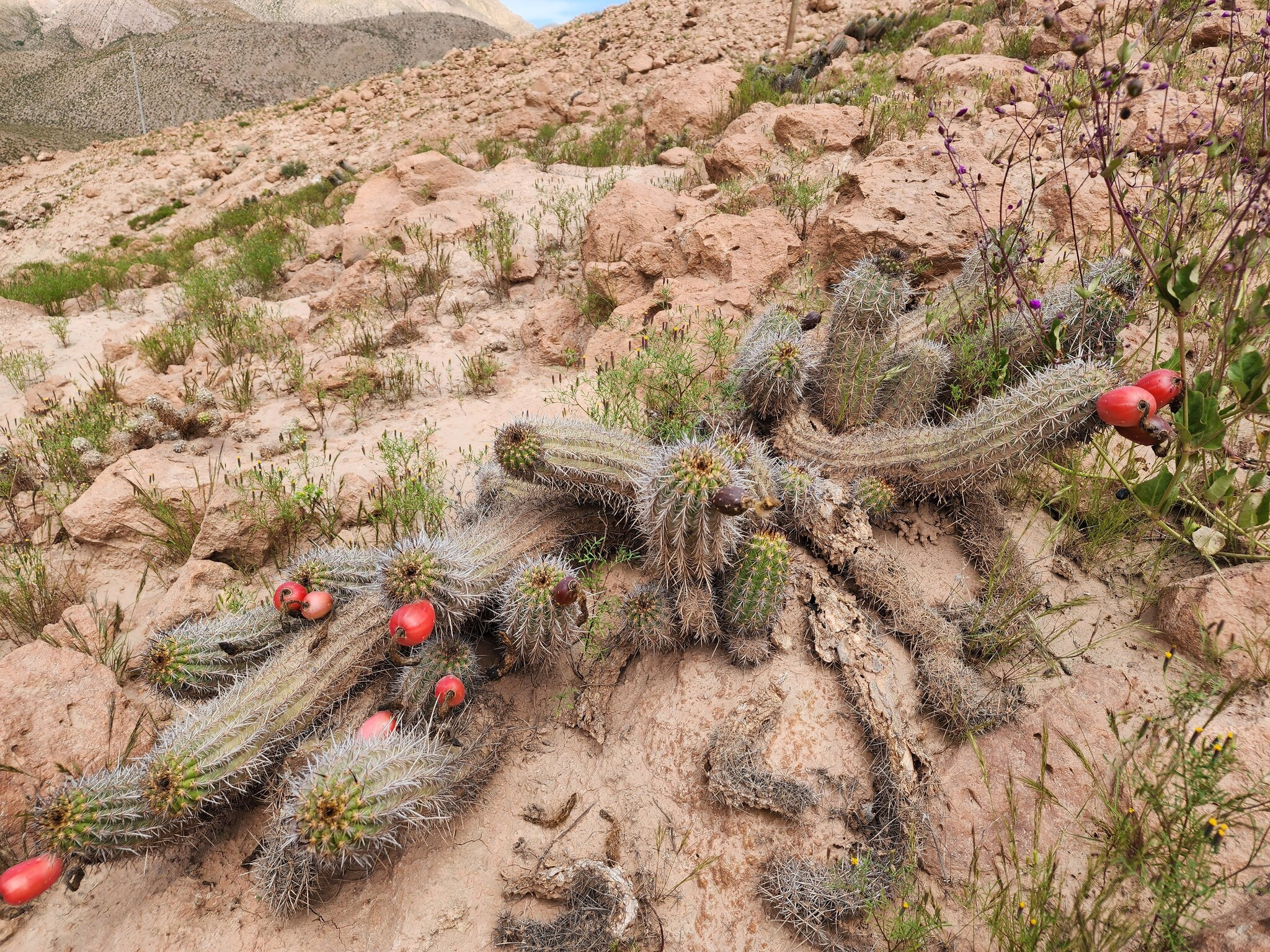
Fruiting plant in Cincha, Peru

== Taxonomy ==
The first description as Cereus platinospinus was made in 1931 by Erich Werdermann and Curt Backeberg. The specific epithet platinospinus is derived from the Latin words platinum for 'silver' and spinus for 'thorned' and refers to the gray to silvery thorns. Curt Backeberg placed the species in the genus Haageocereus in 1936. Further nomenclature synonyms are Binghamia platinospina (Werderm & Backeb.) Werderm. (1937, incorrect name ICBN article 11.4), Borzicactus platinospinus (Werderm. & Backeb.) Borg (1937) and Echinopsis platinospina (Werderm. & Backeb.) Anceschi & Magli (2013).
