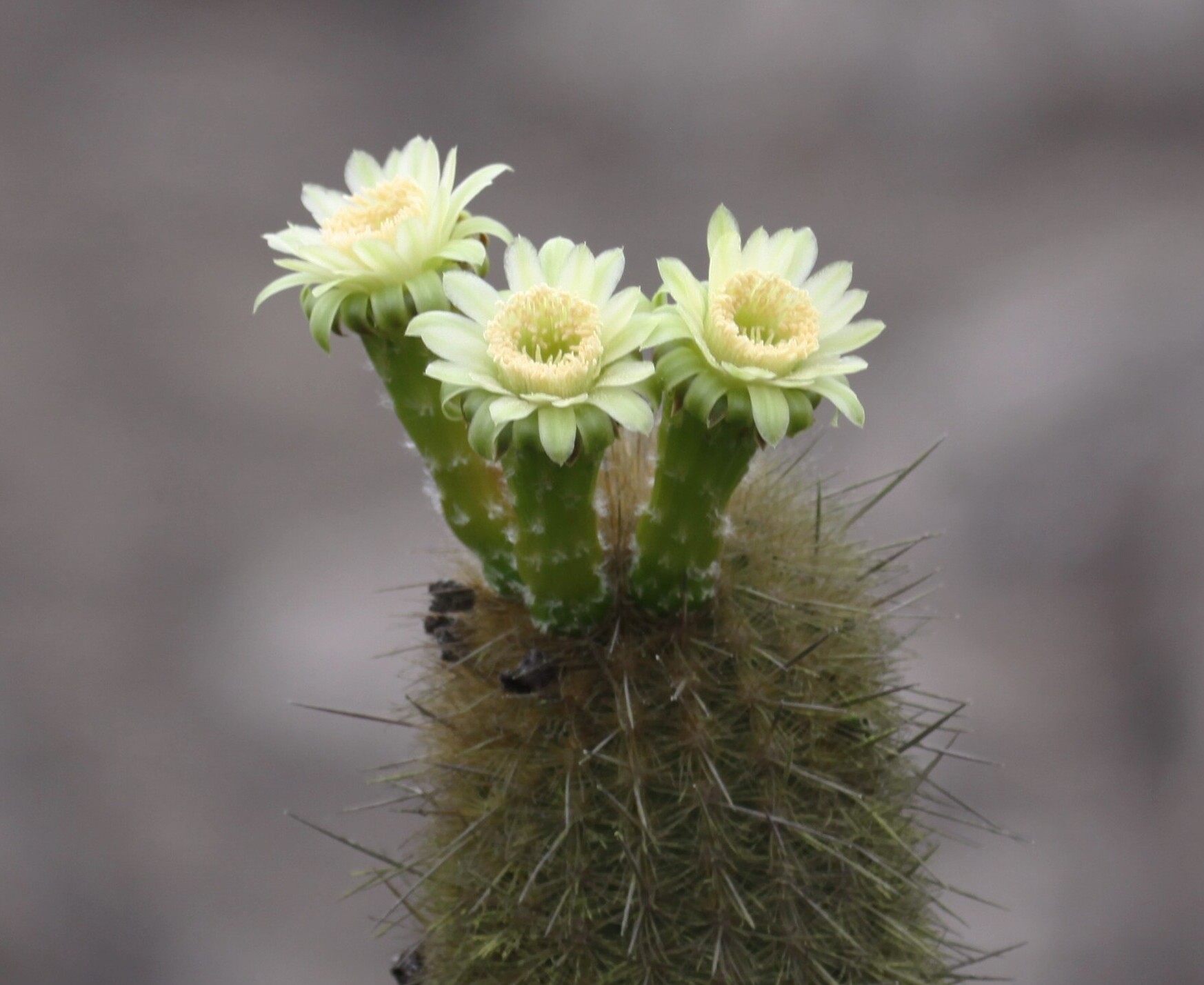

Conservation status
- Least Concern (IUCN 3.1)

Scientific classification
- Kingdom: Plantae
- Clade: Embryophytes
- Clade: Tracheophytes
- Clade: Spermatophytes
- Clade: Angiosperms
- Clade: Eudicots
- Order: Caryophyllales
- Family: Cactaceae
- Subfamily: Cactoideae
- Genus: Haageocereus
- Species: H. pseudomelanostele

Binomial name
- Haageocereus pseudomelanostele (Werderm. & Backeb.) Backeb

Synonyms
- Binghamia pseudomelanostele (Werderm. & Backeb.) Backeb. 1932; Cereus pseudomelanostele Werderm. & Backeb. in C.Backeberg1931; Echinopsis pseudomelanostele (Werderm. & Backeb.) Anceschi & Magli 2013; Peruvocereus salmonoideus Akers 1947; Haageocereus salmonoideus (Akers) Backeb., 1960; Haageocereus kagenekii (C.C.Gmel.) Mottram 2014

= Haageocereus pseudomelanostele =

Species of cactus

Haageocereus pseudomelanostele is a species of Haageocereus found in Peru.

== Description ==
Haageocereus pseudomelanostele grows shrubby, sometimes forming groups. The upright shoots are richly branched from the base up to 70 cm (28 in) high and 8 cm (3.1 in) in diameter. The large areoles are narrow and lined with white wool. The usually only one central spine is initially protruding, later directed downwards, strong, needle-like and up to 5 cm (2.0 in) long. Sometimes there are additional secondary 3 to 6 central spines with a gray tinge. Numerous yellowish radial spines are up to 1.5 cm (0.59 in) long and mixed with many white bristles up to 3 cm (1.2 in) long.

The white flowers are dark purple on the outside and have a greenish-white to red throat. They are about 10 cm (3.9 in) long. The bright red fruits are ovate, up to 6 cm (2.4 in) long and 4 cm (1.6 in) in diameter.

== Subspecies ==
This species is extremely variable, and different populations have been described as distinct species

The following are recognized subspecies:

Image	Subspecies	Distribution
	Haageocereus pseudomelanostele subsp. aureispinus (Rauh & Backeb.) Ostolaza	Peru.
	Haageocereus pseudomelanostele subsp. carminiflorus (Rauh & Backeb.) Ostolaza	Peru.
	Haageocereus pseudomelanostele subsp. chryseus D.R.Hunt	Peru.
	Haageocereus pseudomelanostele subsp. pseudomelanostele	W. Peru
	Haageocereus pseudomelanostele subsp. turbidus (Rauh & Backeb.) Ostolaza	Peru.

== Distribution ==
Haageocereus pseudomelanostele is found in the Peruvian regions of Ancash, Ica and Lima at altitudes of 300 to 2000 meters.

== Taxonomy ==
The first description as Cereus pseudomelanostele was made in 1932 by Erich Werdermann and Curt Backeberg. Curt Backeberg placed the species in the genus Haageocereus in 1936. Other nomenclatural synonyms are Binghamia pseudomelanostele (Werderm. & Backeb.) Backeb. (1932, incorrect name, ICBN article 11.4) and Echinopsis pseudomelanostele (Werderm. & Backeb.) Anceschi & Magli (2013).
