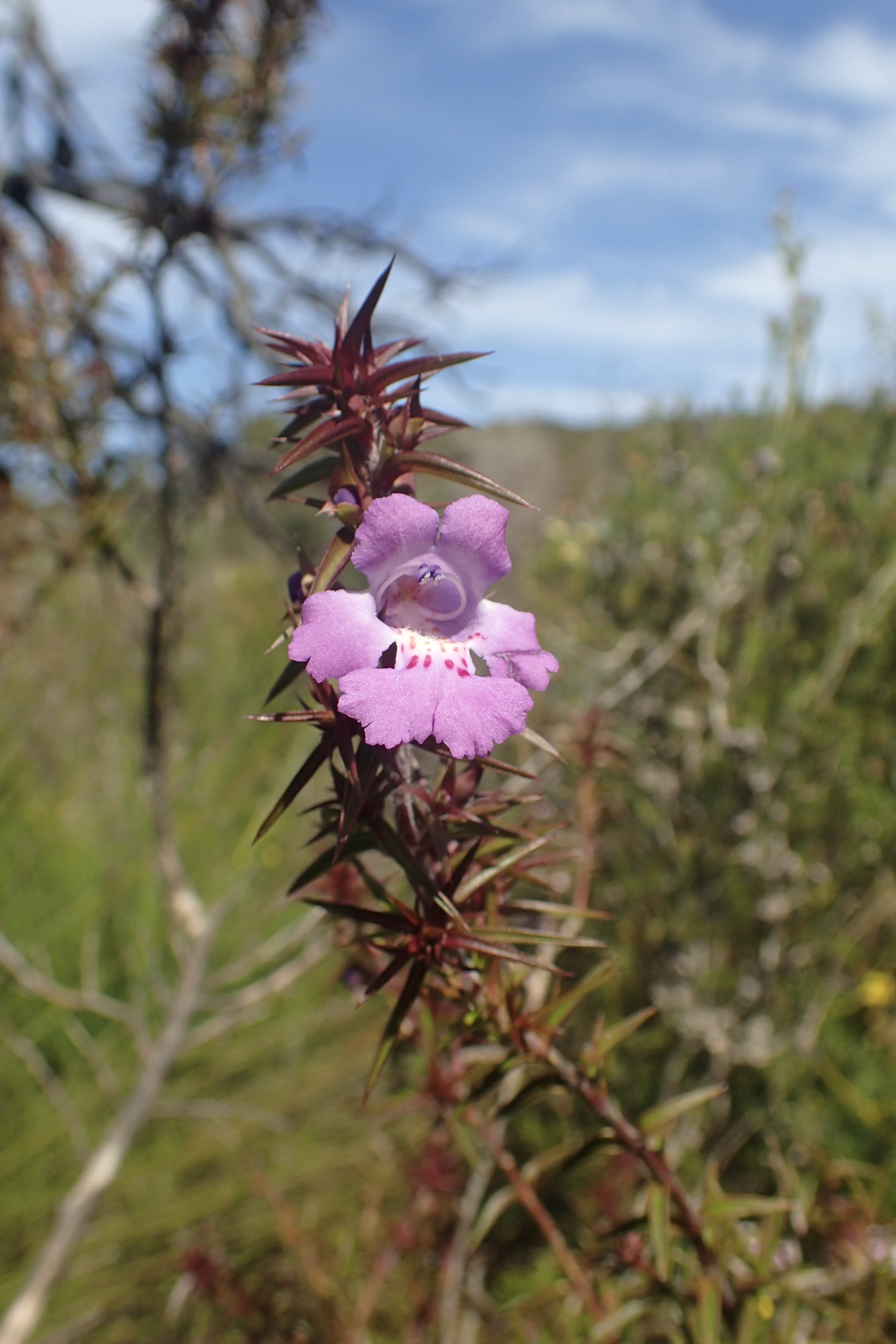

Scientific classification
- Kingdom: Plantae
- Clade: Tracheophytes
- Clade: Angiosperms
- Clade: Eudicots
- Clade: Asterids
- Order: Lamiales
- Family: Lamiaceae
- Genus: Hemiandra
- Species: H. pungens

Binomial name
- Hemiandra pungens R.Br.
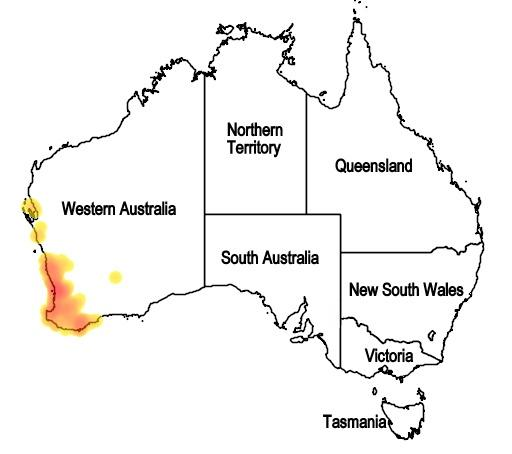

Synonyms
- List: Hemiandra pungens R.Br. var. pungens; Hemigenia pungens (R.Br.) F.Muell.; Hemigenia pungens (R.Br.) F.Muell. f. pungens

= Hemiandra pungens =

Snakebush

Species of flowering plant

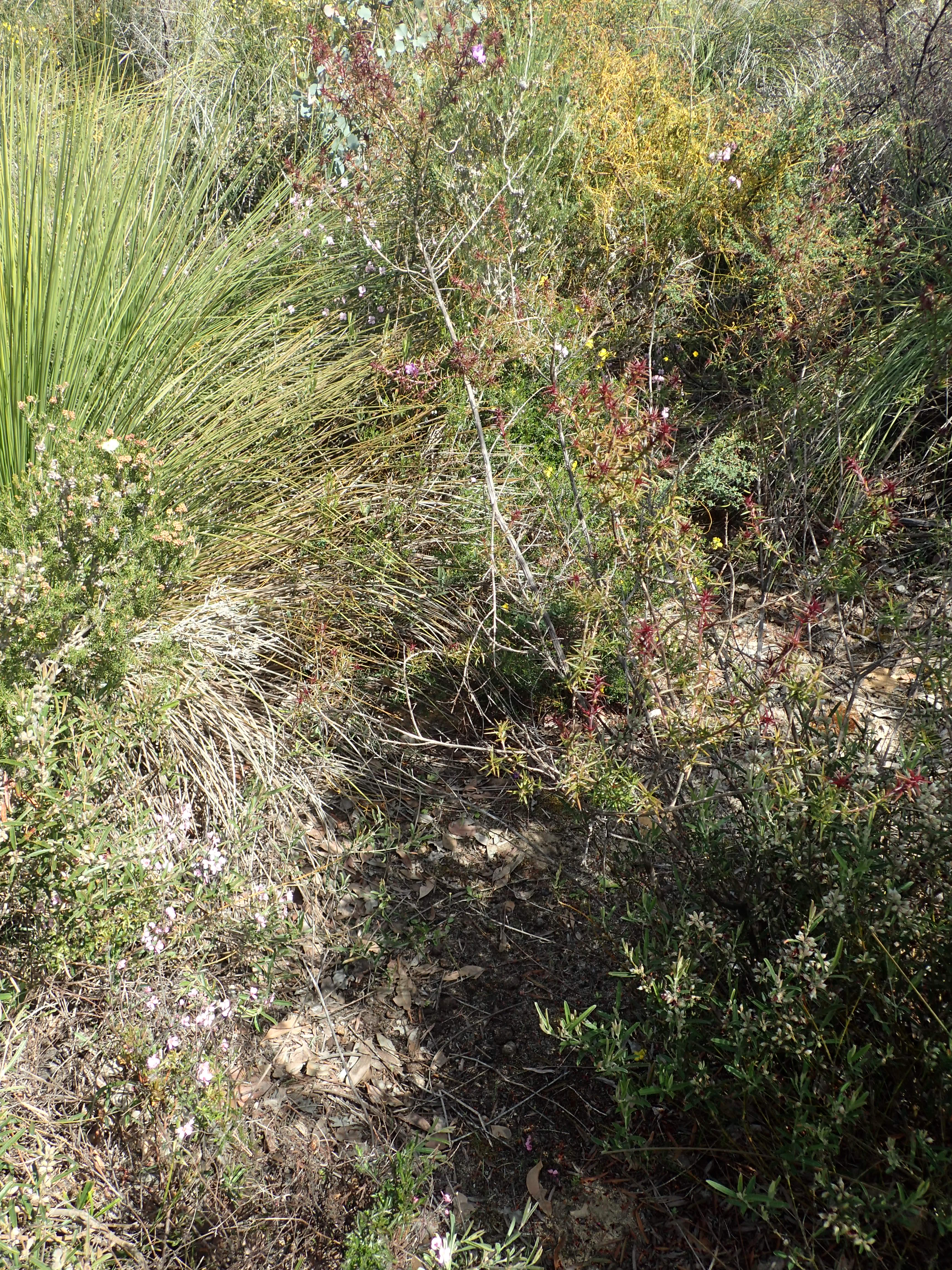
Habit near Preston Beach

Hemiandra pungens, commonly known as snakebush, is a species of flowering plant in the family Lamiaceae and is endemic to southwestern Western Australia. It is a prostrate to ascending shrub with linear to lance-shaped leaves, white, bluish purple or pink flowers and dry capsules.

== Description ==
Hemiandra pungens is a trailing to ascending shrub that typically grows to a height of up to 1 m (3 ft 3 in). Its leaves are sessile, linear to lance-shaped, flat or concave in cross-section, 12–25 mm (0.47–0.98 in) long and end in a short, hard point. The flowers are borne singly or in small racemes in leaf axils, and are pink, white or lilac, tube-shaped, about 20 mm (0.79 in) wide with an erect upper lip with two lobes and a lower lip with three lobes. The lower lip has darker spots in the throat. Flowering occurs in most months, and the capsules are dry, splitting at maturity into four single-seeded nutlets.

== Taxonomy ==
Hemiandra pungens was first formally described in 1810 by Robert Brown and the description was published in his Prodromus florae Novae Hollandiae. The specific epithet (pungens) means 'sharp, hard point' in referring to the leaves.

== Distribution and habitat ==
Snakebush grows in sand, clay and loam in gravel, laterite, granite or on rocky outcrops, and is widespread in the Avon Wheatbelt, Esperance Plains, Geraldton Sandplains, Jarrah Forest, Mallee, Swan Coastal Plain and Warren bioregions of south-western Western Australia.

== Use in horticulture ==
Hemiandra pungens seed is not typically available but this species is easily propagated from cuttings of other plants. It can be grafted onto related species including Westringia fruticosa. It can be grown in containers such as hanging baskets, and it performs best in dry climates without humid summers, in a sunny, well-drained area.
