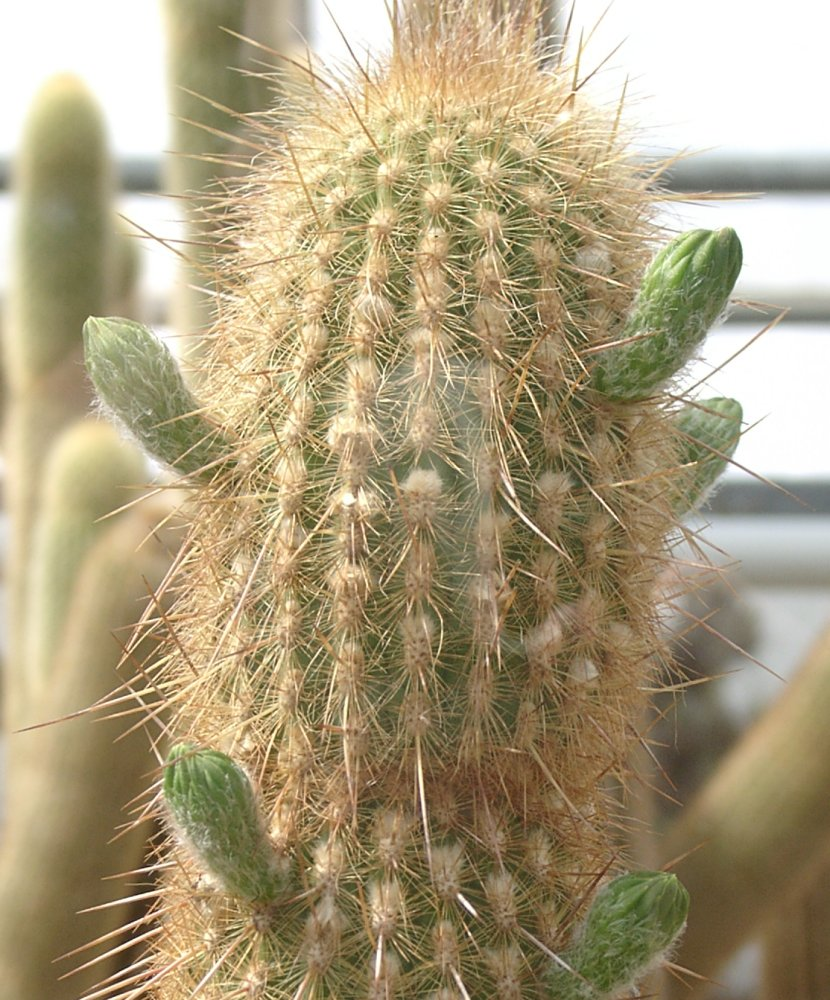
- Haageocereus pseudomelanostele

Scientific classification
- Kingdom: Plantae
- Clade: Embryophytes
- Clade: Tracheophytes
- Clade: Spermatophytes
- Clade: Angiosperms
- Clade: Eudicots
- Order: Caryophyllales
- Family: Cactaceae
- Subfamily: Cactoideae
- Tribe: Cereeae
- Subtribe: Trichocereinae
- Genus: Haageocereus; Backeb.

Type species
- Haageocereus pseudomelanostele

Species
- See text.

Synonyms
- Floresia Krainz & F.Ritter ex Backeb., not validly publ.; Haageocactus.

= Haageocereus =

Genus of cacti

Haageocereus is a genus of cacti endemic to the lower elevations of the extremely dry desert along the coast of Peru and northern Chile.

== Description ==
The species of the genus Haageocereus grow like a shrub to tree-like, with outstretched and creeping, lengthwise, ascending or upright shoots. The shoots usually consist of many ribs, with closely spaced areoles from which numerous thorns arise. Areoles from which flowers arise often have additional bristles.

The tubular to bell-shaped flowers are white to pink or red, open at night and remain open until the next day. The flower tube is strong and fleshy. The flower cup and the flower tube are covered with numerous scales and few to many hairs. The stamens are in a single circle.

The fleshy, spherical fruits are green to red and have a few scales and hairs. The rest of the flowers are perennial. The egg-shaped seeds are shiny black and irregularly pitted.

== Species ==
As of October 2025, the accepted species are:

Image	Scientific name	Distribution
	Haageocereus acranthus (Vaupel) Backeb.	Peru
	Haageocereus decumbens (Vaupel) Backeb.	Chile North, Peru
	Haageocereus fascicularis (Meyen) F.Ritter	S. Peru to Chile (Tarapacá)
	Haageocereus platinospinus (Werderm. & Backeb.) Backeb.	Peru
	Haageocereus pseudomelanostele (Werderm. & Backeb.) Backeb.	Peru
	Haageocereus repens Rauh & Backeb.	Peru
	Haageocereus versicolor (Werderm. & Backeb.) Backeb.	Peru
