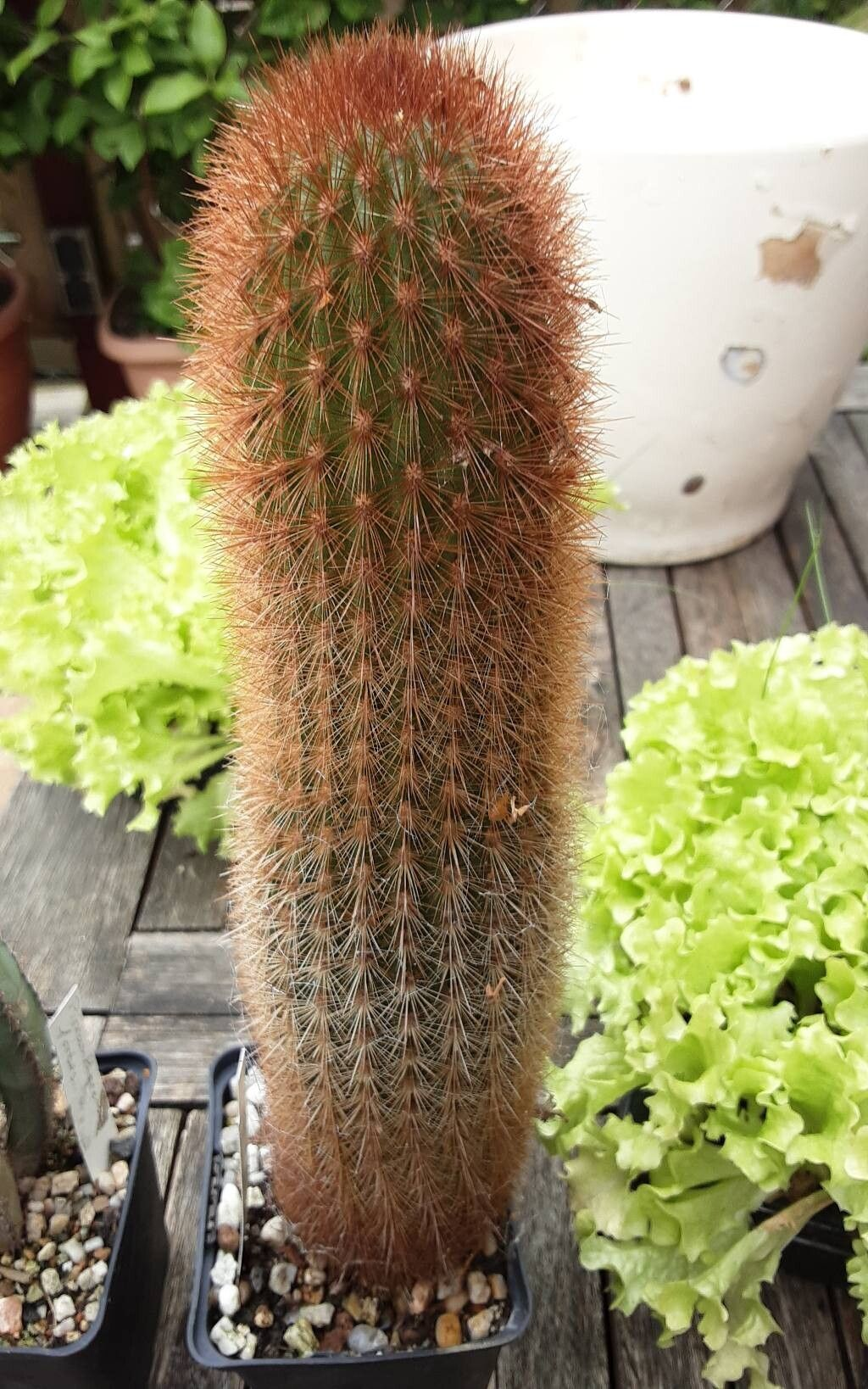

Conservation status
- Critically Endangered (IUCN 3.1)

Scientific classification
- Kingdom: Plantae
- Clade: Embryophytes
- Clade: Tracheophytes
- Clade: Spermatophytes
- Clade: Angiosperms
- Clade: Eudicots
- Order: Caryophyllales
- Family: Cactaceae
- Subfamily: Cactoideae
- Genus: Haageocereus
- Species: H. repens

Binomial name
- Haageocereus repens Rauh & Backeb. 1956 publ. 1957

Synonyms
- Haageocereus pacalaensis var. repens (Rauh & Backeb.) Krainz 1962; Haageocereus pacalaensis subsp. repens (Rauh & Backeb.) Ostolaza 2000

= Haageocereus repens =

Species of cactus

Haageocereus repens is a species of cactus in the genus Haageocereus, found in Peru.

== Description ==
Haageocereus decumbens grows spread out or ascending and often forms richly branched groups with slender shoots that reach1-2 meters and with a diameters of up to 4.5 to 8 cm (1.8 to 3.1 in). There are about 18 to 20 low ribs. The one or two yellow to brown central spines are 1.5 to 3 cm (0.59 to 1.18 in) long. The 25 to 40 and more needle-like yellowish radial spines have a length of 5 to 10 mm (0.20 to 0.39 in). The white flowers reach a diameter of 3 cm (1.2 in) and a length of up to 7 cm (2.8 in). Fruits are ovoid.

== Description ==
Plants are found growing in the desert South of the city of Trujillo, La Libertad, Peru at elevations of 50 to 300 meters.

== Taxonomy ==
This species was first described by Backeberg and Rauh in 1957.
