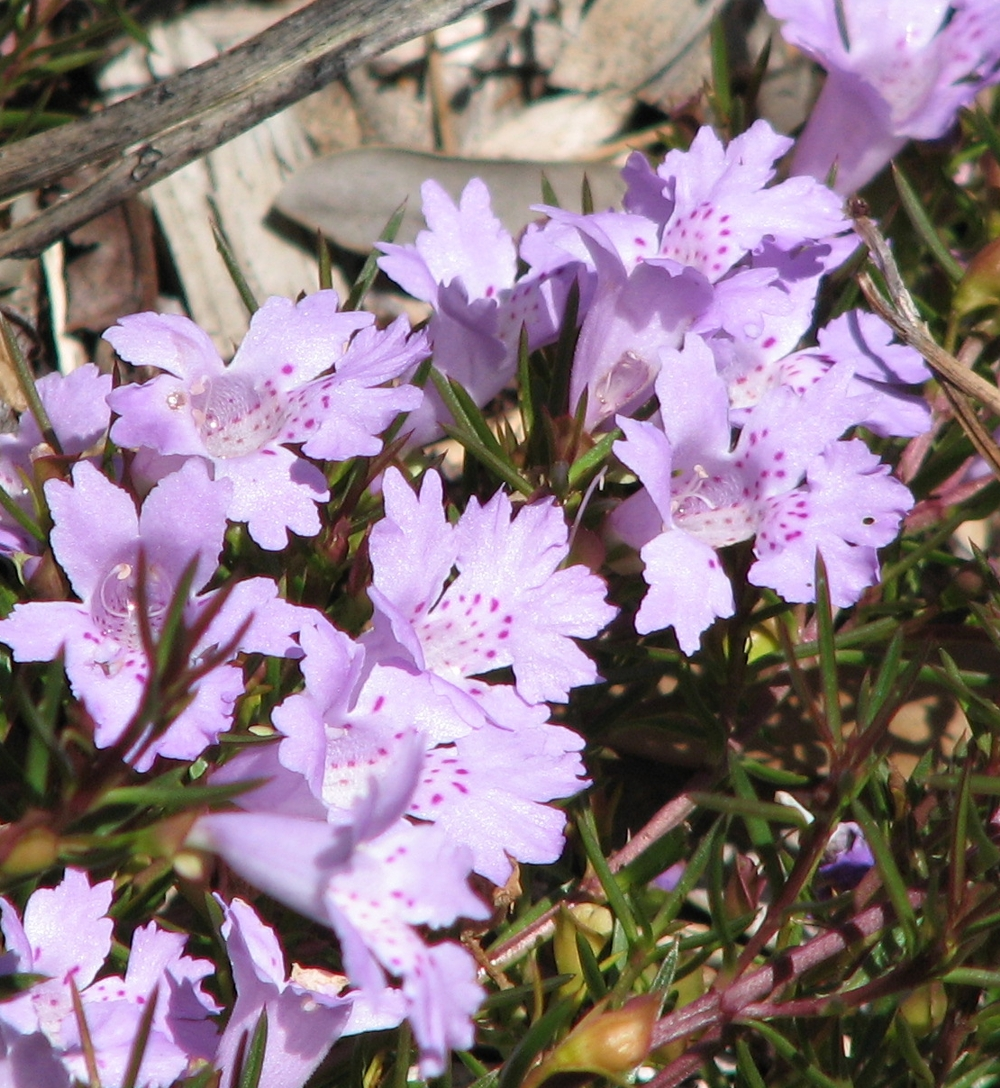
- Hemiandra pungens

Scientific classification
- Kingdom: Plantae
- Clade: Tracheophytes
- Clade: Angiosperms
- Clade: Eudicots
- Clade: Asterids
- Order: Lamiales
- Family: Lamiaceae
- Subfamily: Prostantheroideae
- Genus: Hemiandra; R.Br.

Synonyms
- Hemiandra sect. Cheilocalyx O.H.Sarg. nom. inval.; Hemiandra sect. Euhemiandra Kuntze nom. inval.

= Hemiandra =

Genus of flowering plants

Hemiandra is a genus of nine species of flowering plants of the family Lamiaceae and is endemic to Western Australia. Plants in the genus Hemiandra are shrubs with sessile leaves arranged in opposite pairs, petals with five lobes arranged in two "lips" and the fruit a capsule usually containing four nuts.

== Description ==
Plants in the genus Hemiandra are prostrate to medium shrubs with rigid, leathery, sessile leaves arranged in opposite pairs. The flowers have five egg-shaped sepals fused at the base and five petals fused at the base to form a corolla with two "lips". The upper lip short of the corolla is erect with two lobes, the lower lip longer, spreading and three-lobed. The middle lobe itself often has two lobes. The flowers are white, pink or purple, often spotted in the throat. There are four stamens and a single style with two stigmas. The fruit is a capsule usually containing four nuts.

== Taxonomy ==
The genus Hemiandra was first formally described in 1810 by Robert Brown in his Prodromus Florae Novae Hollandiae et Insulae Van Diemen and the first species he described was Hemiandra pungens. The name Hemiandra means "half male", referring to the anthers that are 1-celled.

=== Species list ===
The following is a list of species of Hemiandra accepted by the Australian Plant Census as at January 2021:

- Hemiandra coccinea O.H.Sarg.
- Hemiandra gardneri O.H.Sarg.
- Hemiandra glabra Benth.
- Hemiandra incana Bartl.
- Hemiandra leiantha Benth.
- Hemiandra linearis Benth.
- Hemiandra pungens R.Br.
- Hemiandra rubriflora O.H.Sarg.
- Hemiandra rutilans O.H.Sarg.
