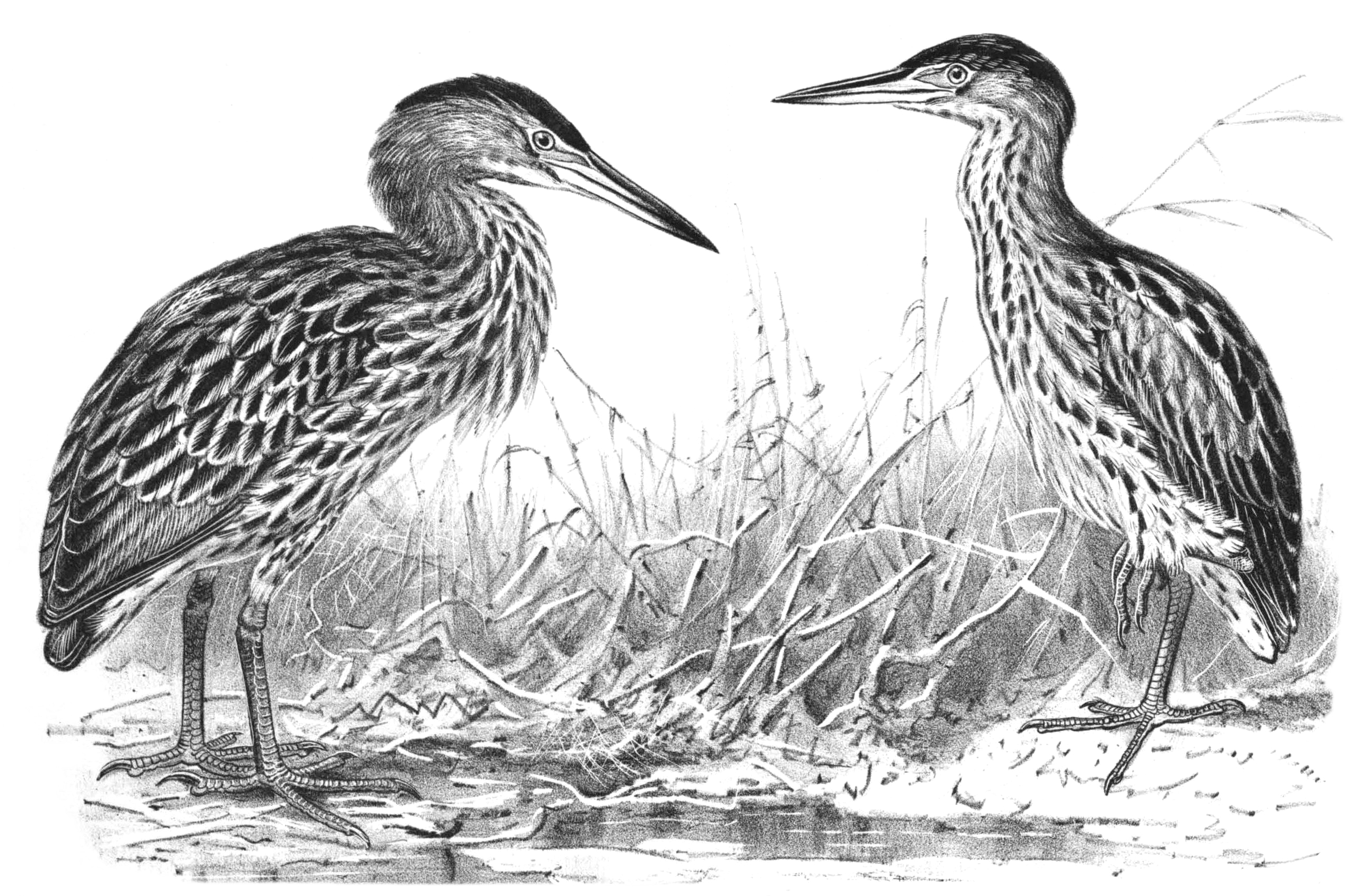
- New Zealand bittern (adult and juvenile males)

Conservation status
- Extinct (IUCN 3.1)

Scientific classification
- Kingdom: Animalia
- Phylum: Chordata
- Class: Aves
- Order: Pelecaniformes
- Family: Ardeidae
- Genus: Botaurus
- Species: †B. novaezelandiae

Binomial name
- †Botaurus novaezelandiae (Purdie, 1871)

Synonyms
- Ardea pusilla Vieill, 1817; Ardetta punctata Gray, 1844; Ardetta pusilla Gould, 1848; Ardeola pusilla Bonap., 1855; Ardeola novaezelandiae A. C. Purdie, 1871; Ardetta maculata Buller, 1873; Ixobrychus minutus novaezelandiae Mathews & Iredale, 1913; Dupetor flavicollis P. L. Horn, 1980

= New Zealand bittern =

Extinct species of heron

The New Zealand bittern (Botaurus novaezelandiae) is an extinct and enigmatic species of heron in the family Ardeidae. It was endemic to New Zealand and was last recorded alive in the 1890s.

Common names for this species include New Zealand little bittern, spotted heron, and kaoriki (Māori). The scientific species name also has numerous junior synonyms. This species was formerly placed in the genus Ixobrychus.

== Taxonomy ==
The species has sometimes been regarded as a subspecies of little bittern (Botaurus minutus), or conspecific with the black-backed bittern (Botaurus dubius) of Australia and New Guinea, though it was first described by Alexander Callender Purdie in 1871 as Ardeola novaezelandiae. In 1980, New Zealand palaeontologist Peter L. Horn found subfossil bones of a bittern from Lake Poukawa, which he named Dupetor flavicollis. In 1991, Philip Millener identified Horn's material as remains of the New Zealand bittern.

== Description ==
Although a small bittern, the species was larger (length about 14.75 inches (38 cm)) than the little bittern (25–36 cm). Few specimens are known, and of these doubt exists even about the sex of some, making published descriptions unreliable. Differences from the little bittern include a larger buff patch on the upper wing, black upper parts streaked light brown, under parts streaked dark brown and rufous-buff.

== Distribution and habitat ==
In recent times, the bird is only known with certainty to have inhabited the South Island of New Zealand, with most records from Westland. Although subfossil remains have been found in the North Island, reports of living birds may have been of misidentified Australasian bitterns. The first scientific specimen was reportedly obtained at Tauranga in the North Island by the Reverend Mr Stack in 1836, but is now untraceable. The holotype specimen in the Museum of New Zealand was taken from the head of Lake Wakatipu in Otago. The recorded habitat for the species includes the wooded margins of saline lagoons and creeks.

== Behaviour ==
Walter Buller quotes a Mr Docherty, who was familiar with the bird in Westland:

They are to be found on the salt-water lagoons on the seashore, always hugging the timbered side of the same. I have seen them in two positions, viz.:— standing on the bank of the lagoon, with their heads bent forward, studiously watching the water; at other times I have seen them standing straight up, almost perpendicular; I should say this is the proper position for the bird to be placed in when stuffed. When speaking of lagoons as the places where they are to be found, I may mention that I caught one about two miles in the bush, on the bank of a creek; but the creek led to a lagoon. They live on small fishes or the roots of reeds; I should say the latter, because at the very place where I caught one I observed the reeds turned up and the roots gone. They are very solitary, and always found alone, and they stand for hours in one place. I heard a person say that he had opened one and found a large egg in it. They breed on the ground in very obscure places; I never heard their cry.

=== Feeding ===
The bittern is recorded as eating mudfish and worms in captivity, when given in water.

=== Voice ===
Two calls were recorded by Buller, a "peculiar snapping cry" as an alarm call, and a "cry not unlike that of a kingfisher, though not so loud".
