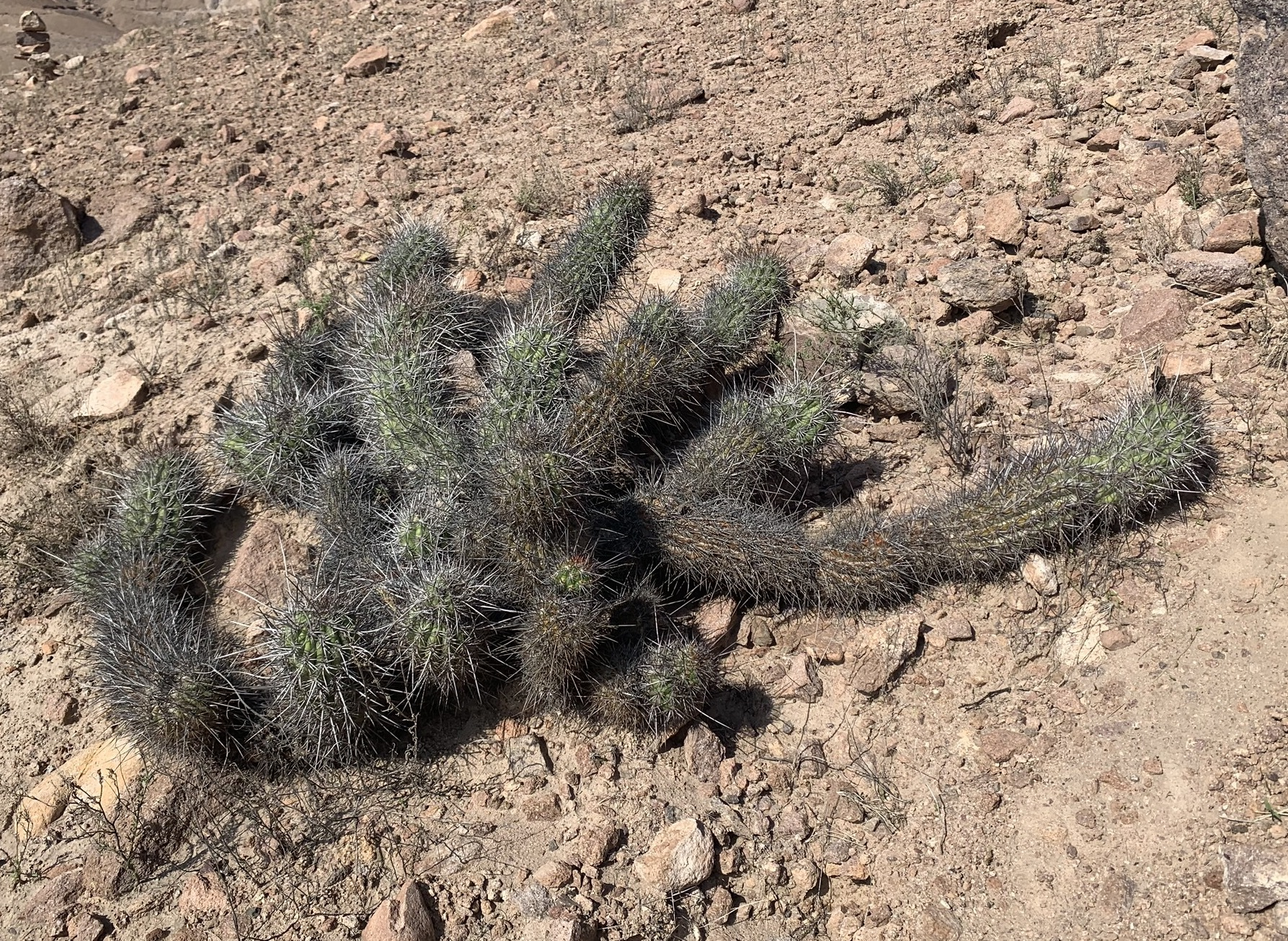

Scientific classification
- Kingdom: Plantae
- Clade: Tracheophytes
- Clade: Angiosperms
- Clade: Eudicots
- Order: Caryophyllales
- Family: Cactaceae
- Subfamily: Cactoideae
- Genus: Haageocereus
- Species: H. fascicularis

Binomial name
- Haageocereus fascicularis (Meyen) F.Ritter

Synonyms
- Cactus fascicularis (Meyen) Meyen 1834; Cereus fascicularis Meyen 1833; Echinocactus fascicularis (Meyen) Steud. 1840; Trichocereus fascicularis (Meyen) Britton & Rose 1920; Weberbauerocereus fascicularis (Meyen) Backeb. 1942; Echinopsis nothochilensis Anceschi & Magli 2013; Haageocereus chilensis F.Ritter ex D.R.Hunt 2005

= Haageocereus fascicularis =

Species of cactus

Haageocereus fascicularis commonly known as 'Quisco de la precordillera de Arica' is a species of cactus from the family Cactaceae, native to southern Peru and northern Chile.

== Description ==
Haageocereus fascicularis as a shrub with ascending to upright, gray-green shoots that branch from the base. These shoots reach lengths of 0.5 to 1 meter and have diameters of 4 to 7 cm. They feature eleven to eighteen blunt ribs. The one or two straight central spines are 4 to 15 cm long, while the seven to ten spreading radial spines are 1 to 4 cm in length.

The white, strongly scented flowers can reach 7 to 8.5 cm in length. The pericarpel and flower tube are covered with hairs and reddish scales. The fruit is egg-shaped and bright red.

== Distribution ==
Haageocereus fascicularis is distributed in Chile from Arica to Tarapacá.

== Taxonomy ==
The first description as Cereus fascicularis was made in 1833 by Franz Julius Ferdinand Meyen. The specific epithet fascicularis means 'bundle-like, tuft-like'. Friedrich Ritter placed the species in the genus Haageocereus in 1980. Further nomenclature synonyms are Echinocactus fascicularis (Meyen) Steud. (1840), Cactus fascicularis (Meyen) Meyen (1843), Cereus fascicularis (Meyen) K.Schum. (1897, nom. inval.), Trichocereus fascicularis (Meyen) Britton & Rose (1920) and Weberbauerocereus fascicularis (Meyen) Backeb. (1942).
