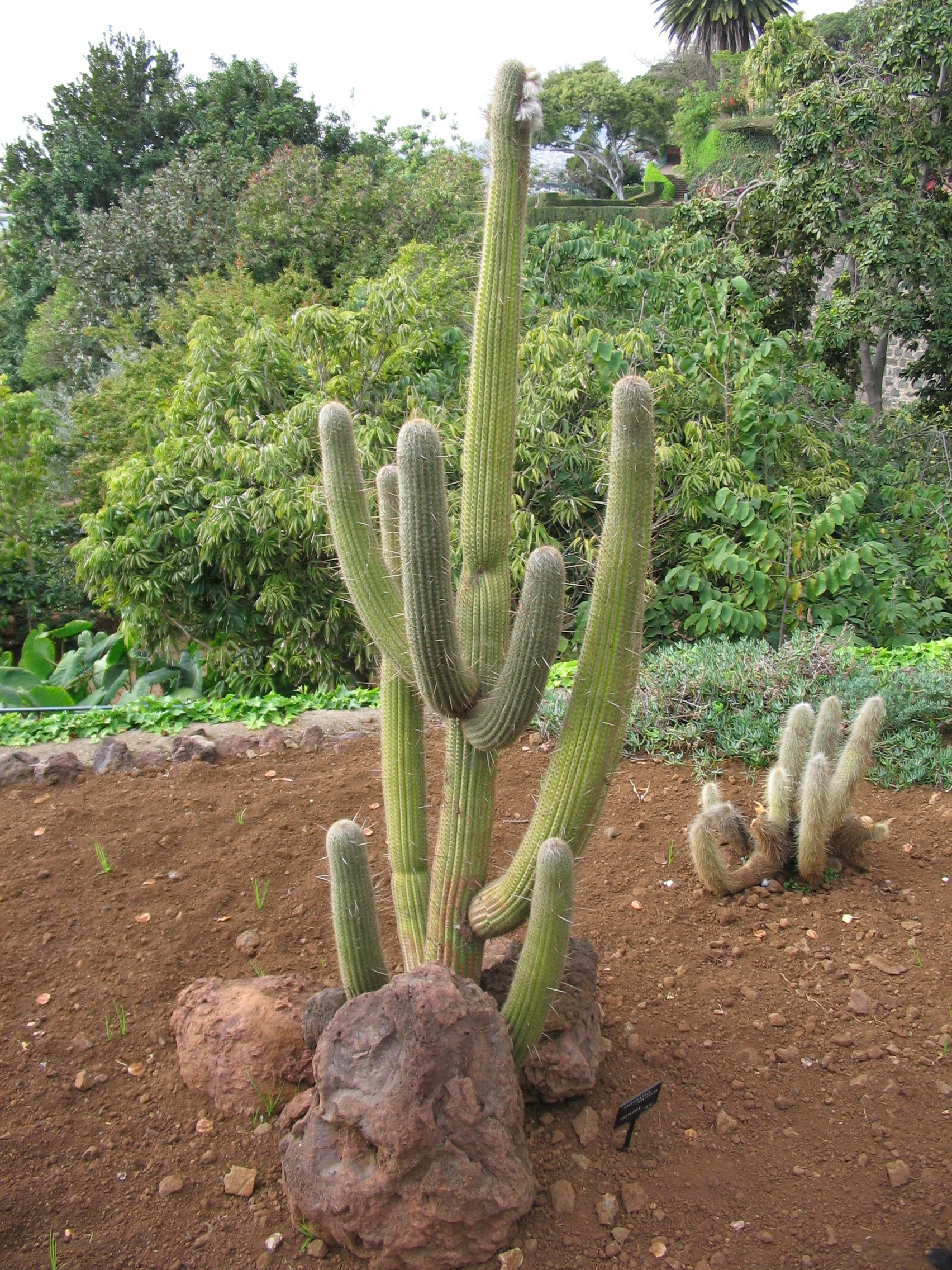

Conservation status
- Least Concern (IUCN 3.1)

Scientific classification
- Kingdom: Plantae
- Clade: Embryophytes
- Clade: Tracheophytes
- Clade: Spermatophytes
- Clade: Angiosperms
- Clade: Eudicots
- Order: Caryophyllales
- Family: Cactaceae
- Subfamily: Cactoideae
- Genus: Haageocereus
- Species: H. versicolor

Binomial name
- Haageocereus versicolor (Werderm. & Backeb.) Backeb. 1936

Synonyms
- Binghamia versicolor (Werderm. & Backeb.) J.West 1932; Cereus versicolor Werderm. & Backeb. 1931

= Haageocereus versicolor =

Species of cactus

Haageocereus versicolor is a species of Haageocereus found in Peru.

== Description ==
Haageocereus versicolor grows as a shrub with upright or spreading shoots that branch from the base and form groups. The shoots reach a length of up to 1.5 meters with a diameter of 8 cm (3.1 in). There are 16 to 22 ribs on which there are whitish woolly areoles. The one or two central spines pointing upwards or downwards are yellow to brownish and 1 to 4 cm (0.39 to 1.57 in) long. The 20 to 30 fine, yellowish radial spines are up to 5 mm (0.20 in) long.

The slender-tubed, white flowers reach a length of 8 to 10 cm (3.1 to 3.9 in) and a diameter of 6 to 7 cm (2.4 to 2.8 in). The spherical, yellow fruits have a diameter of up to 3 cm (1.2 in).

== Subspecies ==
Image	Subspecies	Distribution
	Haageocereus versicolor subsp. pseudoversicolor (Rauh & Backeb.) N.Calderón	Peru.
	Haageocereus versicolor subsp. versicolor	Peru.

== Distribution ==
Haageocereus versicolor is widespread in Peru in the Piura, Lambayeque and Tumbes regions at altitudes of up to 1500 meters.

== Taxonomy ==
The first description as Cereus versicolor was made in 1931 by Erich Werdermann and Curt Backeberg. The specific epithet is derived from the Latin word versicolor for 'colorful' and refers to the differently colored thorns. Curt Backeberg placed the species in the genus Haageocereus in 1936. A nomenclature synonym is Binghamia versicolor (Werderm. & Backeb.) J.West (1932, incorrect name, ICBN article 11.4).
