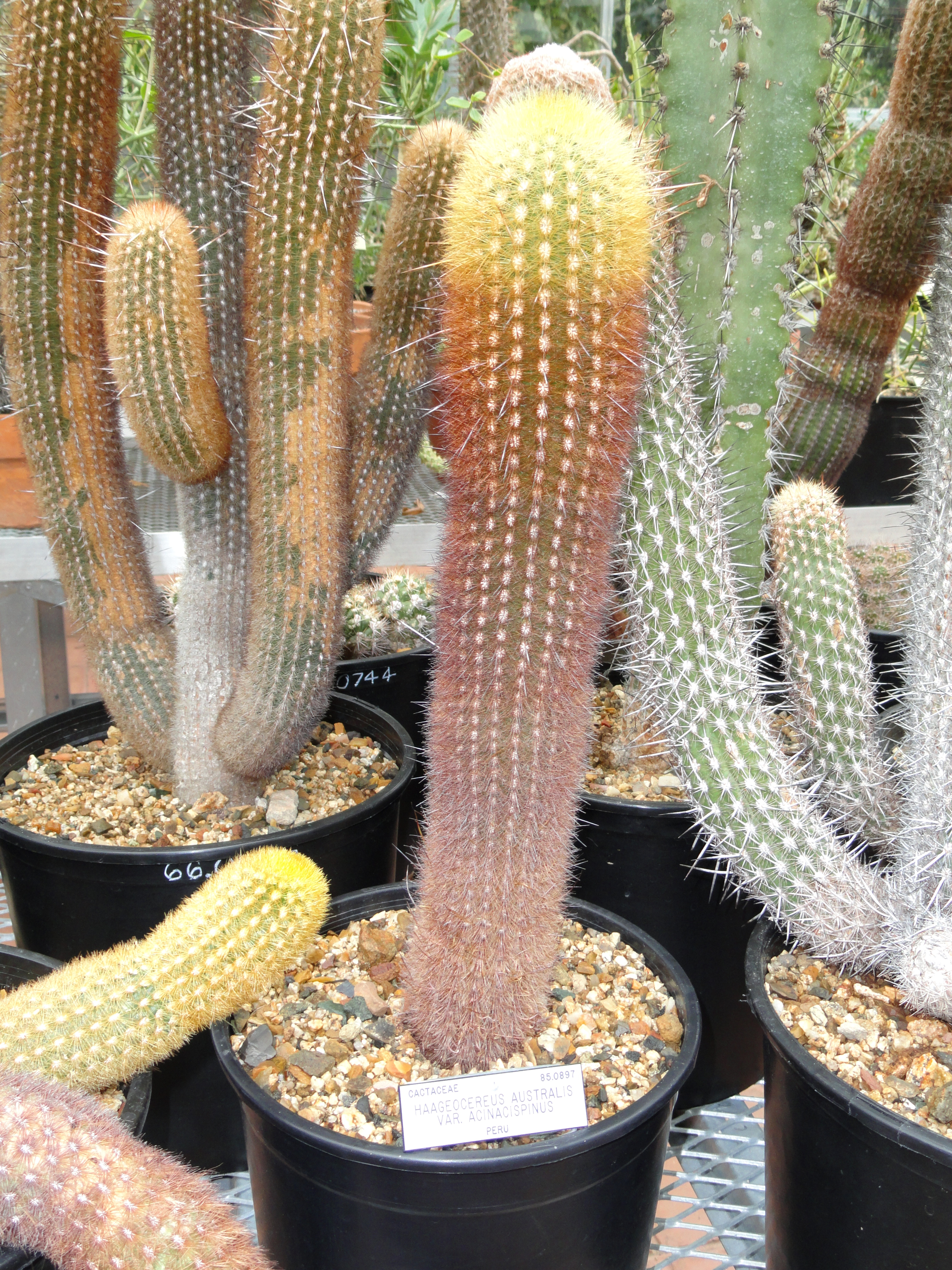

Conservation status
- Least Concern (IUCN 3.1)

Scientific classification
- Kingdom: Plantae
- Clade: Tracheophytes
- Clade: Angiosperms
- Clade: Eudicots
- Order: Caryophyllales
- Family: Cactaceae
- Subfamily: Cactoideae
- Genus: Haageocereus
- Species: H. decumbens

Binomial name
- Haageocereus decumbens (Meyen) F.Ritter 1934

Synonyms
- List: Binghamia decumbens (Vaupel) Werderm. 1937; Borzicactus decumbens (Vaupel) Britton & Rose 1920; Cereus decumbens Vaupel 1913; Echinopsis decumbens (Vaupel) Mayta 2015; Binghamia australis (Backeb.) Werderm.1937; Echinopsis magliana Mayta & Molinari 2015; Echinopsis subtilispina (F.Ritter) Mayta 2015; Haageocereus ambiguus Rauh & Backeb. 1956 publ. 1957; Haageocereus ambiguus var. reductus Rauh & Backeb. 1956 publ. 1957); Haageocereus australis Backeb. 1936; Haageocereus australis var. acinacispinus Rauh & Backeb. 1956 publ. 1957); Haageocereus australis f. nanus F.Ritter 1980; Haageocereus australis f. subtilispinus F.Ritter 1980; Haageocereus chalaensis F.Ritter 1981; Haageocereus decumbens var. brevispinus F.Ritter 1981; Haageocereus decumbens var. spinosior Backeb. 1951; Haageocereus decumbens f. spinosior (Backeb.) Krainz 1965; Haageocereus litoralis Rauh & Backeb. 1956 publ. 1957; Haageocereus mamillatus Rauh & Backeb. 1956 publ. 1957; Haageocereus mamillatus var. brevior Rauh & Backeb. 1956 publ. 1957; Haageocereus multicolorispinus Buining 1963; Haageocereus ocona-camanensis Rauh & Backeb. in C.Backeberg, 1956 publ. 1957; Haageocereus subtilispinus F.Ritter 1981

= Haageocereus decumbens =

Species of cactus

Haageocereus decumbens is a species of Haageocereus found in S. Peru to Chile (Tarapacá)

== Description ==
Haageocereus decumbens grows spread out or ascending and often forms richly branched groups with slender shoots that reach diameters of up to 5 cm (2.0 in). There are about 20 low ribs. The one or two light to dark brown central spines are directed downwards and are up to 5 cm (2.0 in) long. The up to 30 and more needle-like yellowish radial spines have a length of 5 to 8 mm (0.20 to 0.31 in).

The white flowers reach a diameter of 4.5 cm (1.8 in) and a length of up to 8 cm (3.1 in).

== Distribution ==
Haageocereus decumbens is distributed in Peru in the Arequipa region near Chala and Mollendo at altitudes of 200 to 700 meters.

== Taxonomy ==
The first description as Cereus decumbens was made in 1913 by Friedrich Karl Johann Vaupel. Curt Backeberg placed the species in the genus Haageocereus in 1934. Other nomenclature synonyms are Borzicactus decumbens (Vaupel) Britton & Rose (1920), Binghamia decumbens (Vaupel) Werderm. (1937, incorrect name ICBN article 11.4) and Echinopsis decumbens (Vaupel) Mayta (2015).
