= Alexander Callender Purdie =

New Zealand botanist (1824–1899)

Alexander Callender Purdie (25 December 1824 – 24 June 1899) was a New Zealand naturalist and botanist.

== Early life ==
Purdie was born in the parish of Fenwick, East Ayrshire, Scotland. After his schooling he moved to Glasgow acquiring a trade as a wire worker which he pursued in England and Scotland for several years, while also following his interest in natural history. He emigrated with his wife Ellen in 1860 from Glasgow to New Zealand on the ship “Pladda”, and settled in Dunedin.

== Work ==
Purdie was a foundation member of both the Otago Institute in 1869, of which he was elected Curator and Librarian in 1873, and the Dunedin Field Naturalists’ Club, in 1872. He also had a long association with the Otago Museum, of which he was caretaker or curator, and then with the University of Otago where he was a janitor until his retirement in 1893. He died in Dunedin survived by his son and daughter, his wife having died about nine years previously.

Purdie was the original describer of the New Zealand little bittern (Ixobrychus novaezelandiae (Purdie, 1871)). He is commemorated in the name of the plants, Helichrysum purdiei and Boronia purdieana. His son Alex Purdie (c.1861 - 1905) collected the type specimen of the moth species Ichneutica purdii which was named in his honour by Richard William Fereday.
