= Oswald Hewlett Sargent =

Botanist (1880–1952)

Oswald Hewlett Sargent (5 December 1880, Selly Oak, Worcestershire, England – 4 March 1952, Claremont, Western Australia) was an English-Australian pharmacist, amateur botanist, and plant collector. He was recognized as an authority on Western Australian orchids, and studied problems of orchid pollination.

== Biography ==
As a small boy, Oswald Hewlett Sargent, his parents, and his two sisters emigrated to Western Australia in 1886. His father started a pharmacy at York, Western Australia, where Oswald Sargent was trained. He then attended Perth Technical School, where he was encouraged to study botany by Cecil Rollo Payton Andrews and Alexander Purdie (1859–1905) (whose father was Alexander Callender Purdie). In 1902 Sargent passed his final pharmacy examination and went to work in his father's pharmacy. In 1916 his father died and Sargent inherited the pharmacy. In 1925 he married a pharmacist, Gertrude Victoria Onions, and the couple moved to Perth. He joined in 1924 the Western Australian Naturalists's Club and served as the club's vice-president in 1925 and president from 1928 to 1929 and from 1931 to 1932. He and his wife started pharmacies in Perth and, later, at Claremont – a western suburb of Perth, but both ventures were financially unsuccessful. In 1934 the Sargents returned to York. At York, his wife ran the pharmacy, while he concentrated more effort on botanical collection and experimentation.

Upon his death in 1952 he was survived by his wife and son. Oswald H. Sargent was a cousin of Frederick Wallace Edwards.

== Eponyms ==
- (Adiantaceae) Notholaena sargentii (Christ) Fraser-Jenk.
- (Myoporaceae) Eremophila sargentii (S.Moore) Chinnock

== Selected publications ==
- Sargent, Oswald H. (1918). "Fragments of the Flower Biology of Westralian Plants". Annals of Botany. 32 (126): 215–231. doi:10.1093/oxfordjournals.aob.a089672. JSTOR 43236256.
- Sargent, O. H. (1928). "Reactions Between Birds and Plants". Emu - Austral Ornithology. 27 (3): 185–192. Bibcode:1928EmuAO..27..185S. doi:10.1071/MU927185.
- Sargent, O. H. (1930). "Xerophytes and xerophily". Proceedings of the Linnean Society of New South Wales. 65: 577–586.
- Sargent, O. H. (1934). "Pollination in Pterostylis". Victorian Naturalist. 51 (3): 82–84.
