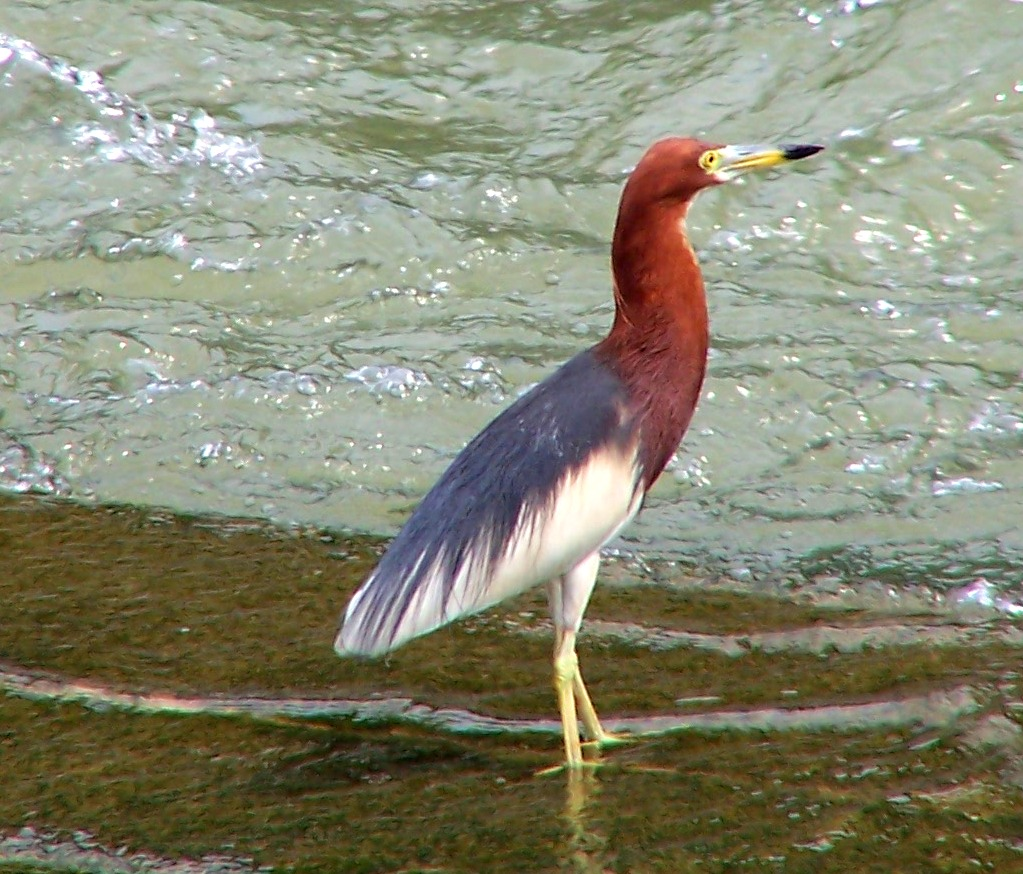
- Adult in breeding plumage
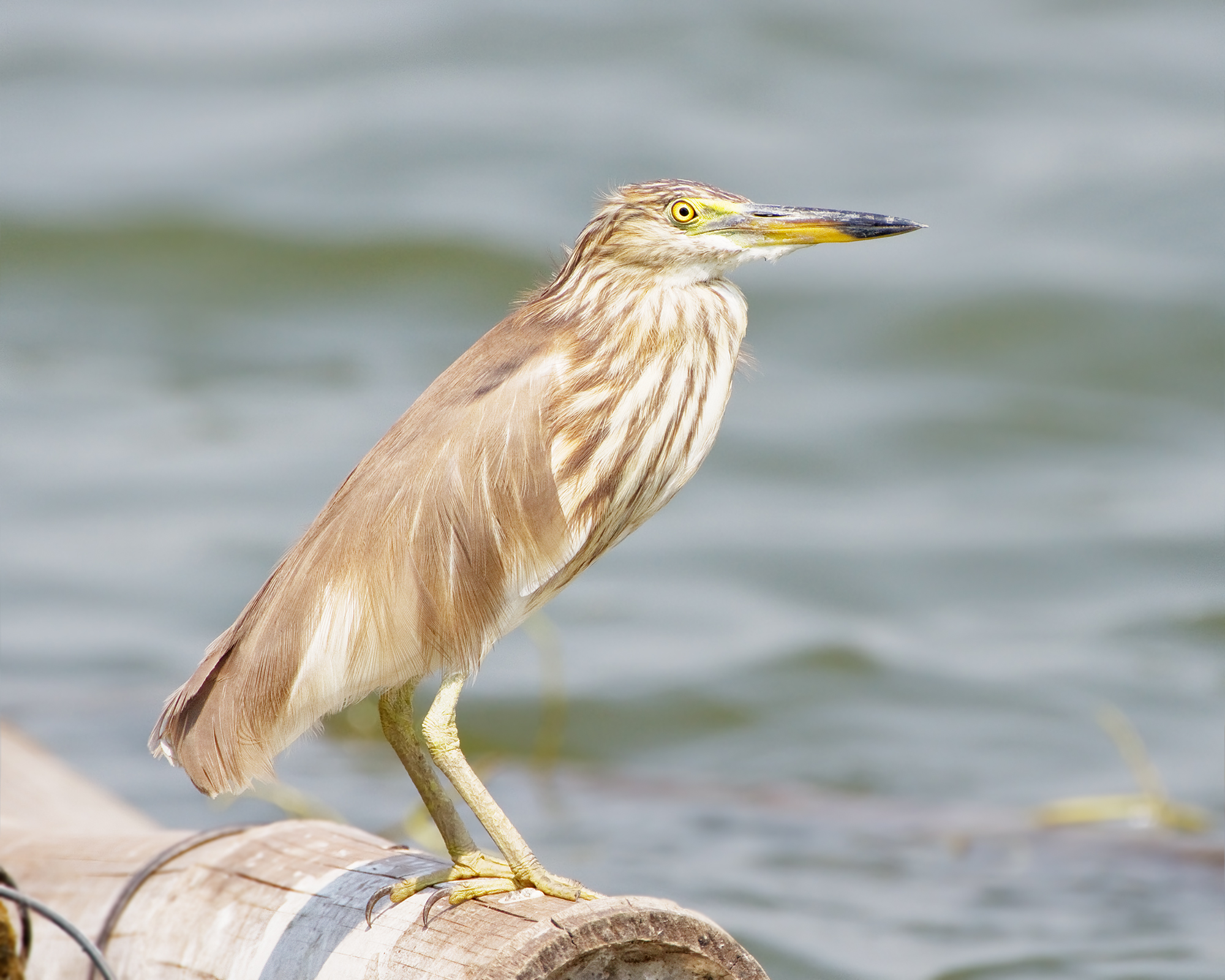
- Adult in winter plumage

Conservation status
- Least Concern (IUCN 3.1)

Scientific classification
- Kingdom: Animalia
- Phylum: Chordata
- Class: Aves
- Order: Pelecaniformes
- Family: Ardeidae
- Genus: Ardeola
- Species: A. bacchus

Binomial name
- Ardeola bacchus (Bonaparte, 1855)
- Global range of A. bacchus, compared to its presumed closest relatives Ardeola bacchus Breeding range Ardeola bacchus Non-breeding range Ardeola grayii range Ardeola speciosa range

= Chinese pond heron =

Species of bird

The Chinese pond heron (Ardeola bacchus) is an East Asian freshwater bird of the heron family, (Ardeidae). It is one of six species of birds known as "pond herons" (genus Ardeola). It is parapatric (or nearly so) with the Indian pond heron (A. grayii) to the west and the Javan pond heron (A. speciosa) to the south, and these three are presumed to form a superspecies. As a group they are variously affiliated with the squacco heron (A. ralloides) or the Malagasy pond heron (A. idae). As of mid-2011 there are no published molecular analyses of pond heron interrelationships and osteological data is likewise not analyzed for all relevant comparison taxa.

== Description and ecology ==
The Chinese pond heron is typically 47 cm (19 in) long with white wings, a yellow bill with a black tip, yellow eyes and legs. Its overall colour is red, blue and white during breeding season, and greyish-brown and flecked with white at other times.

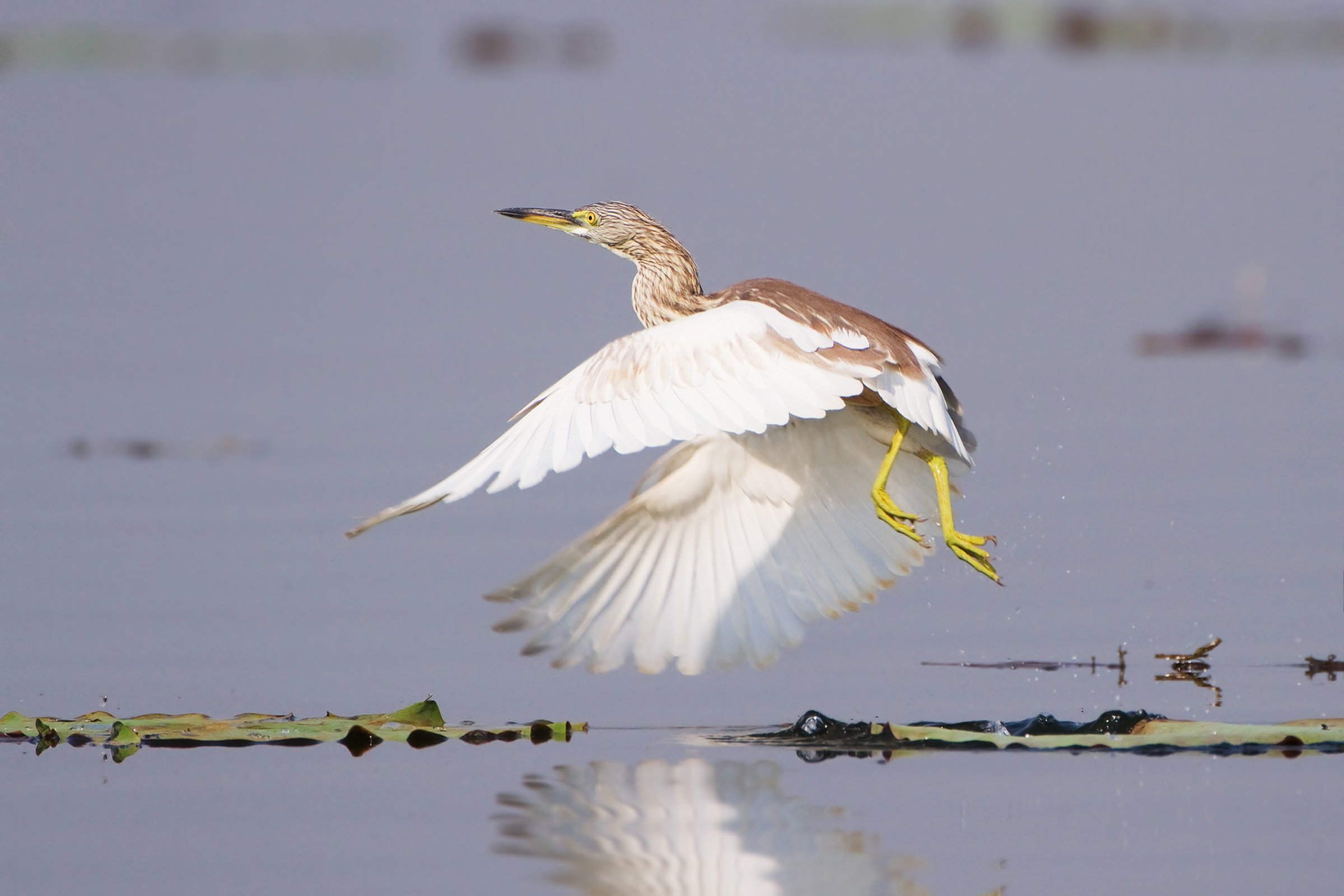
Adult take-off in winter plumage

It is found in shallow fresh and salt water wetlands and ponds in China and adjacent temperate and subtropical East Asia. Essentially a lowland bird, its range is delimited by the subarctic regions in the north, and by the mountain ranges in the west and south.

The species is prone to some vagrancy. One individual in breeding plumage was seen by the river at Bonzon near Gangaw—just inside the Chin State of Burma—west of the species' usual range, on April 8, 1995. A stray bird stopping over on Saint Paul Island, Alaska on August 4–9, 1997 was the first recorded occurrence of this species in North America.

Its food consists of insects, fish, and crustaceans. The Chinese pond heron often nests in mixed-species heronries. It lays a clutch of 3–6 blue-green eggs.

It is fairly common and not considered a threatened species by the IUCN.
