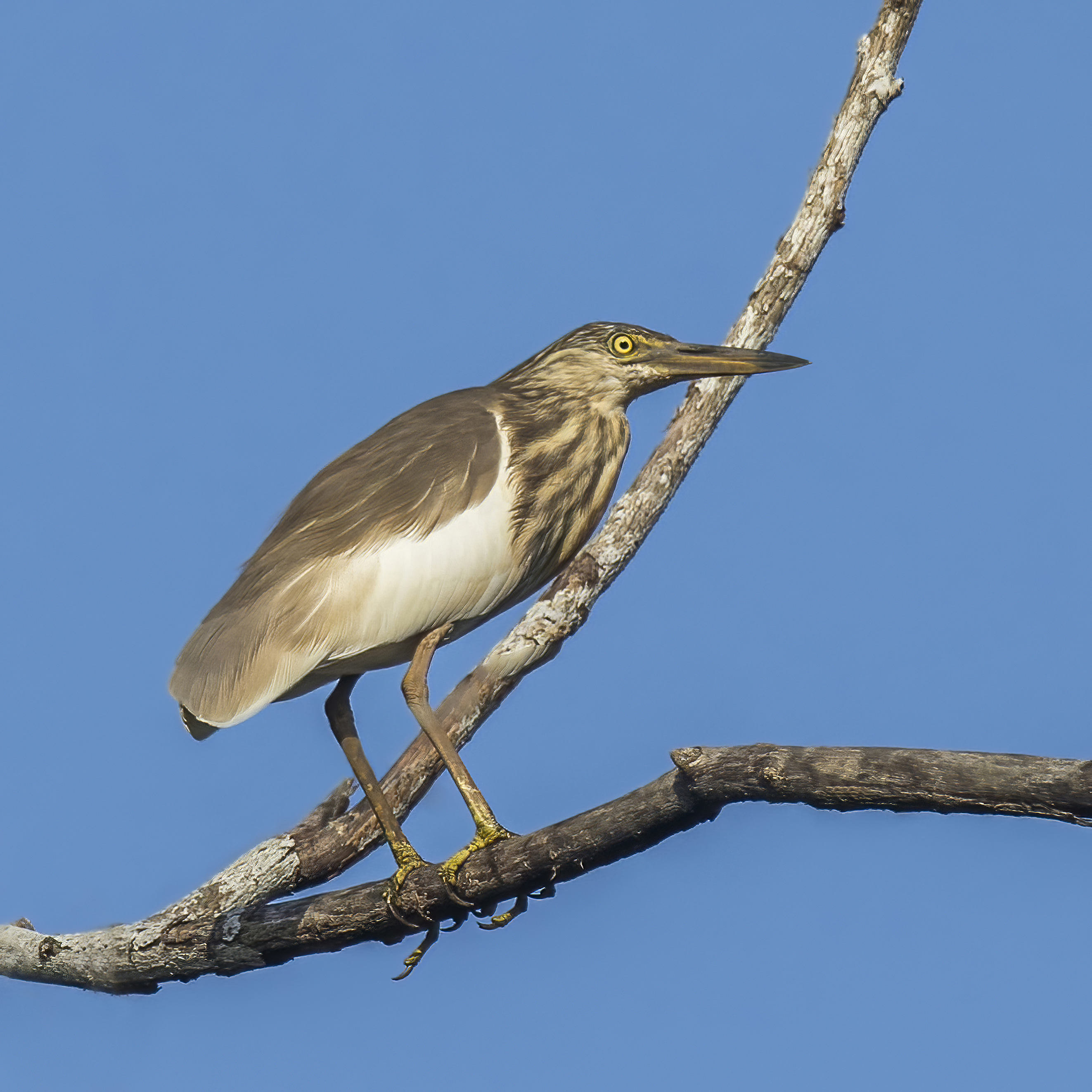
- In non-breeding plumage (Sri Lanka)
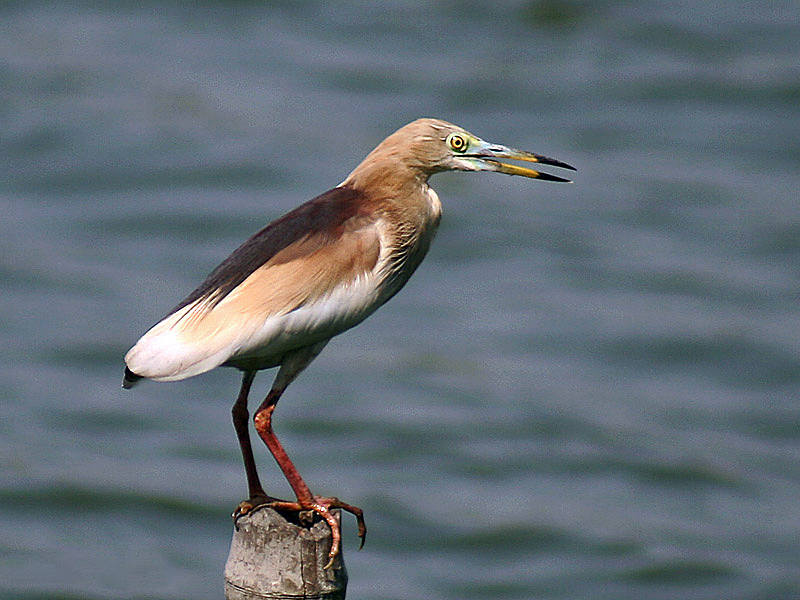
- Breeding plumage (India) Call

Conservation status
- Least Concern (IUCN 3.1)

Scientific classification
- Kingdom: Animalia
- Phylum: Chordata
- Class: Aves
- Order: Pelecaniformes
- Family: Ardeidae
- Genus: Ardeola
- Species: A. grayii

Binomial name
- Ardeola grayii (Sykes, 1832)

Synonyms
- Ardeola leucoptera

= Indian pond heron =

Species of heron

The Indian pond heron or paddybird (Ardeola grayii) is a small heron. It is of Old World origins, breeding in southern Iran and east to the Indian subcontinent, Burma, and Sri Lanka. They are widespread and common but can be easily missed when they stalk prey at the edge of small water-bodies or even when they roost close to human habitations.

They are distinctive when they take off, with bright white wings flashing in contrast to the cryptic streaked olive and brown colours of the body. Their camouflage is so excellent that they can be approached closely before they take to flight, a behaviour which has resulted in folk names and beliefs that the birds are short-sighted or blind.

== Description ==
Indian pond herons are stocky with short necks, short thick bills and buff-brown backs. In summer, adults have long neck feathers. Their appearance is transformed from dull colours when they take to flight and the white of the wings makes them very prominent. They are very similar to the squacco herons, Ardeola ralloides, but darker backed. To the east of their range, they are replaced by the Chinese pond herons, Ardeola bacchus.

During the breeding season, there are records of individuals with red legs. The numbers do not suggest that this is a normal change for adults during the breeding season and some have suggested the possibility of it being genetic variants.

Erythristic plumage has been noted. The race phillipsi has been suggested for the populations found in the Maldives, without much acceptance. It forms a superspecies with the closely related Chinese pond heron, Javan pond heron and the Madagascar pond heron.

They are usually silent but may make a harsh croak in alarm when flushed or near their nests.

This bird was first described by Colonel W. H. Sykes in 1832 and given its scientific name in honour of John Edward Gray. Karyology studies indicate that pond herons have 68 chromosomes (2N).

== Behaviour and ecology ==
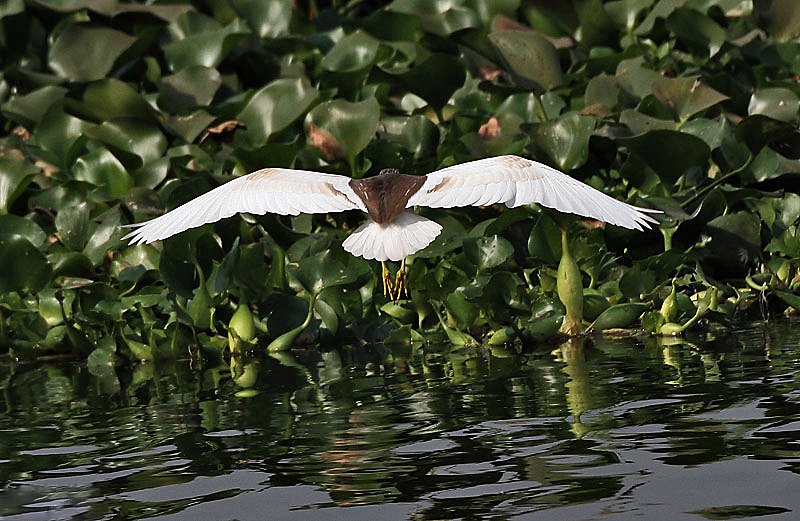
When flushed the contrasting white wings flash into view

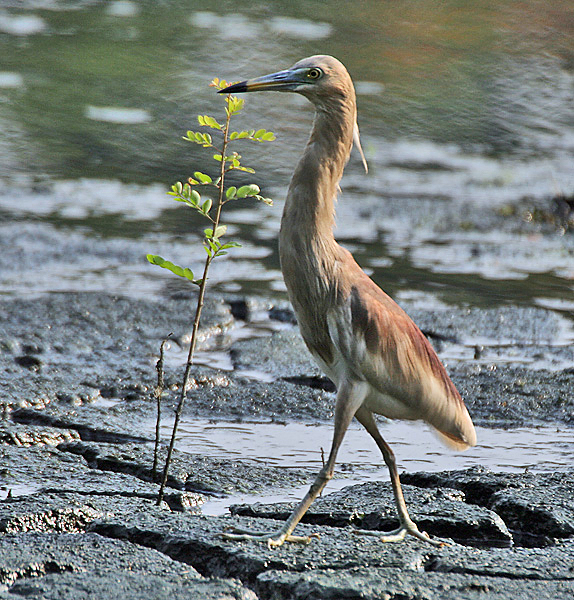
Usually hunched, they appear short necked

They are very common in India, and are usually solitary foragers but numbers of them may sometimes feed in close proximity during the dry seasons when small wetlands have a high concentration of prey. They are semi-colonial breeders. They may also forage at garbage heaps. During dry seasons, they sometimes take to foraging on well watered lawns or even dry grassland. When foraging, they allow close approach and flush only at close range. They sometimes form communal roosts, often in avenue trees over busy urban areas.

=== Food and feeding ===
The Indian pond heron's feeding habitat is marshy wetlands. They usually feed at the edge of ponds but make extensive use of floating vegetation such as water hyacinth to access deeper water. They may also on occasion swim on water or fish from the air and land in deeper waters. They have also been observed to fly and capture fishes leaping out of water. Sometimes, they fly low over water to drive frogs and fishes towards the shore before settling along the shoreline. They have been noted to pick up crumbs of bread and drop them on the water surface to bait fishes.

The primary food of these birds includes crustaceans, aquatic insects, fishes, tadpoles and sometimes leeches (Herpobdelloides sp.). Outside wetlands, these herons feed on insects (including crickets, dragonflies and bees), fish (Barilius noted as important in a study in Chandigarh) and amphibians.

=== Breeding ===
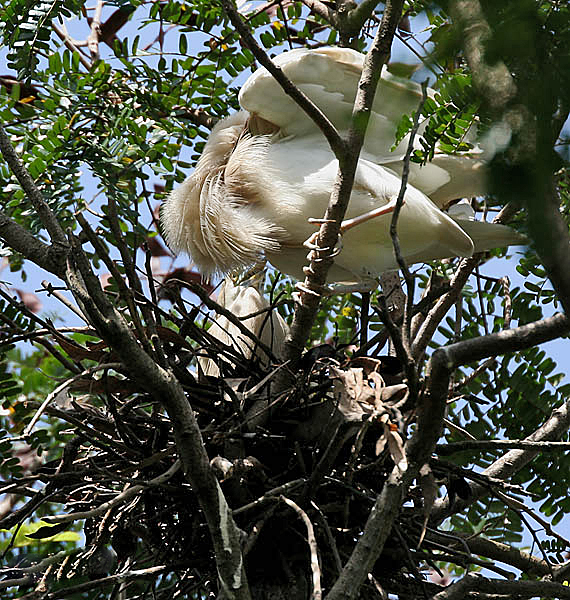
Pair at nest in Kolkata, West Bengal, India

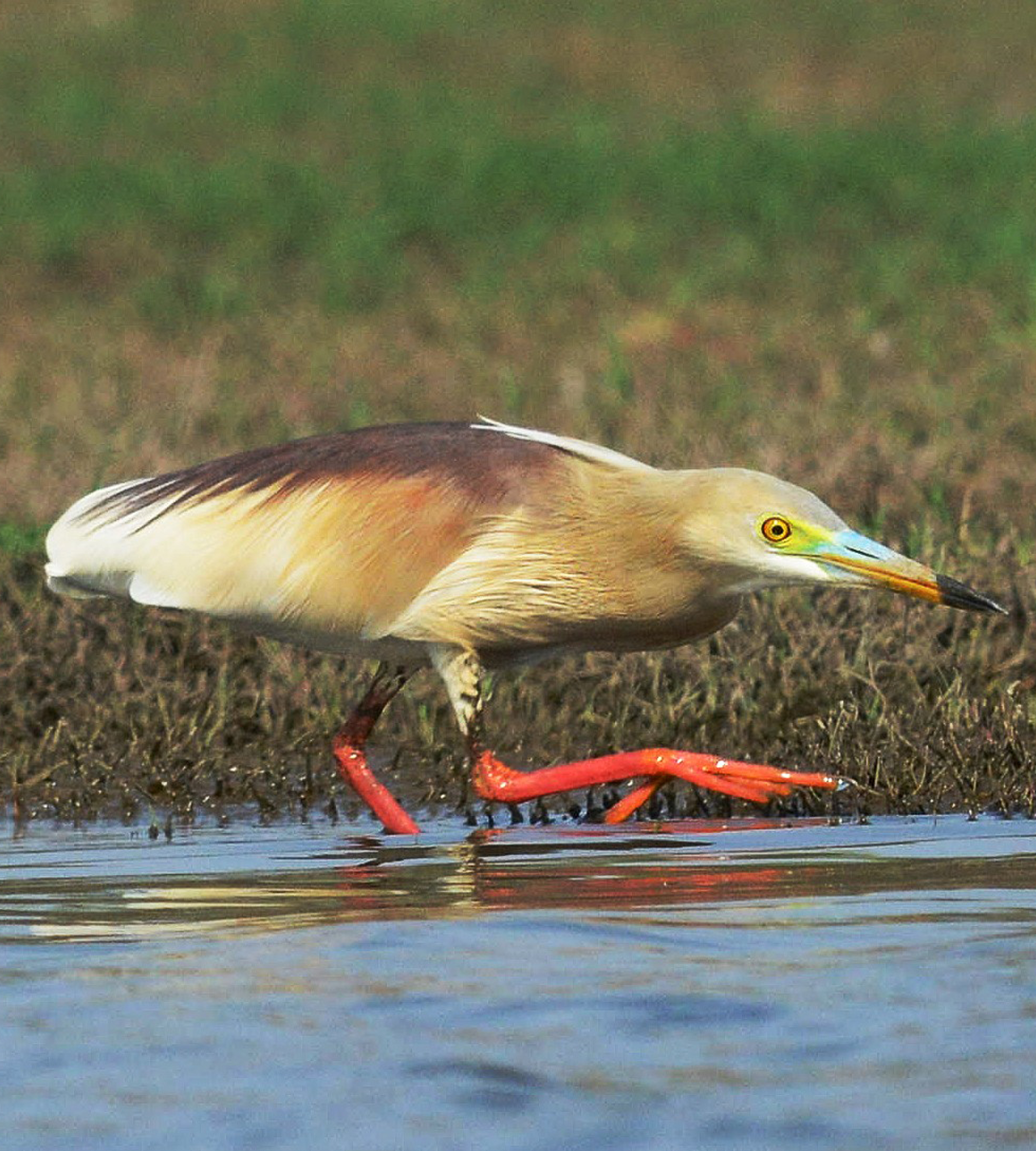
Indian pond heron with bright red legs in breeding season

The breeding season begins with the onset of the monsoons. They nest in small colonies, often with other wading birds, usually on platforms of sticks in trees or shrubs. Most nests are built at a height of about 9 to 10 m in large leafy trees. The nest material is collected by the male while the female builds the nest. Three to five eggs are laid. The eggs hatch asynchronously, taking 18 to 24 days to hatch. Both parents feed the young. Fish are the main diet fed to young. Nest sites that are not disturbed may be reused year after year.

=== Mortality factors ===
They have few predators but injured birds may be taken by birds of prey.

An arbovirus that causes "Balagodu", trematodes and several other parasites have been isolated from the species. Antibodies to Japanese encephalitis and West Nile virus has been detected in pond herons and cattle egrets from southern India. Traces of heavy metals acquired from feeding in polluted waters may be particularly concentrated in the tail feathers.

== In culture ==
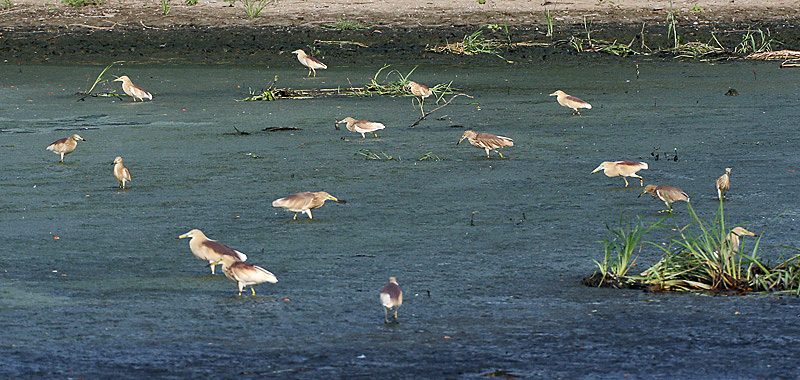
Large numbers in a drying pond

The habit of standing still and flushing only at the last moment has led to widespread folk beliefs that they are semi-blind and their name in many languages includes such suggestions. In Sri Lanka the bird is called kana koka which translates as "half-blind heron" in the Sinhala language. The Hindustani phrase "bagla bhagat" has been used to describe a "wolf in sheep's clothing" or a hypocrite appearing like a meditating saint and occurs in a Marathi proverb. The paddy-bird also appears as a character in the Hitopadesha where, in one story, it takes injury to itself to save a king. The bird was noted by Anglo-Indian naturalist-writers for the surprising transformation in colours. Phil Robinson described the bird as one that sits all dingy gray and flies all white. It is said to have been eaten by many in India in former times.

During the height of the plume trade, feathers were collected from the "paddy bird" and exported to Britain.

== Other sources ==
- Lamba B.S. (1963). "Nidification of some Indian birds. No.6. The Indian Pond Heron or Paddy bird Ardeola grayii (Sykes)". Pavo. 1 (1): 35–43.
- de Boer LEM, van Brink JM (1982). "Cytotaxonomy of the Ciconiiformes (Aves), with karyotypes of eight species new to cytology". Cytogenet Cell Genet. 34 (1–2): 19–34. doi:10.1159/000131791. PMID 7151490.
- Parasharya BM, Bhat HR (1987). "Unusual feeding strategies of the Little Egret and Pond Heron". Pavo. 25 (1–2): 13–16.
