= Ardeirhynchus =

Scientific classification
- Kingdom: Animalia
- Phylum: Acanthocephala
- Class: Palaeacanthocephala
- Order: Polymorphida
- Family: Polymorphidae
- Genus: Ardeirhynchus; Dimitrova & Georgiev, 1994
- Species: A. spiralis

Binomial name
- Ardeirhynchus spiralis (Rudolphi, 1809) (Note: A binomial authority in parentheses indicates that the species was originally described in a genus other than Ardeirhynchus.)

Synonyms
- Echinorhynchus spiralis; Prosthorhynchus spiralis; Plagiorhynchus spiralis

Genus of worms

Ardeirhynchus is a monotypic genus of parasitic worms belonging to the family Polymorphidae. Its sole described species is Ardeirhynchus spiralis (Rudolphi, 1809), which is found in Northern America.

== Taxonomy ==
The genus was described by Dimitrova & Georgiev in 1994. The original description of Ardeirhynchus spiralis was done by Rudolphi in 1809. The National Center for Biotechnology Information does not indicate that any phylogenetic analysis has been published on Ardeirhynchus that would confirm its position as a unique genus in the family Polymorphidae. A phylogenetic tree was created.

== Description ==
A. spiralis consists of a proboscis covered in hooks and a long trunk. The genus is distinguished from Arhythmorhynchus, which is the most morphologically similar genus, in three ways: a considerably shorter neck, minute trunk spines, the distribution of groups of hypodermal nuclei in the anterior part of the trunk and in lateral rows along the length of the posterior part of the trunk, the position of the male genital system (which in this genus occupies the posterior 1/8-1/6 part of the trunk), and a terminal genital pore.

== Distribution ==
The distribution of A. spiralis is determined by that of its hosts. It is found in Bulgaria (host: Squacco heron).

== Hosts ==
Life cycle of Acanthocephala. (Note: There are no known aberrant human infections for A. spiralis species.)

The life cycle of an acanthocephalan consists of three stages beginning when an infective acanthor (development of an egg) is released from the intestines of the definitive host and then ingested by an arthropod, the intermediate host. Although the intermediate hosts of Ardeirhynchus are arthropods. When the acanthor molts, the second stage called the acanthella begins. This stage involves penetrating the wall of the mesenteron or the intestine of the intermediate host and growing. The final stage is the infective cystacanth which is the larval or juvenile state of an Acanthocephalan, differing from the adult only in size and stage of sexual development. The cystacanths within the intermediate hosts are consumed by the definitive host, usually attaching to the walls of the intestines, and as adults they reproduce sexually in the intestines. The acanthor is passed in the feces of the definitive host and the cycle repeats. There may be paratenic hosts (hosts where parasites infest but do not undergo larval development or sexual reproduction) for Ardeirhynchus.

A. spiralis parasitizes the herons Little bittern (Botaurus minutus) and squacco heron (Ardeola ralloides). The prevalence in the first host is 1.9% and usually only 1 worm is found. There are no reported cases of A. spiralis infesting humans in the English language medical literature.

Hosts for Ardeirhynchus spiralis

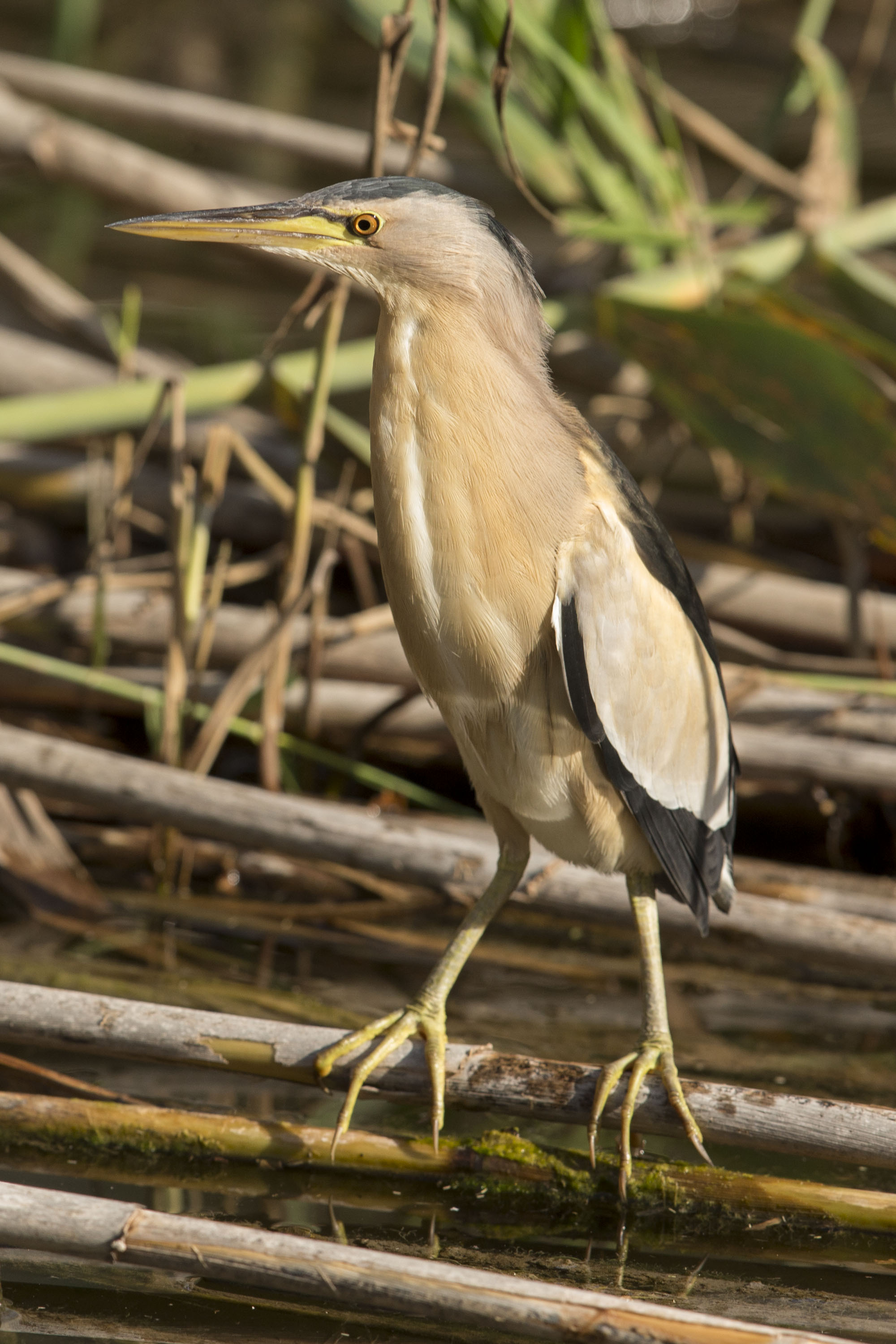
Little bittern

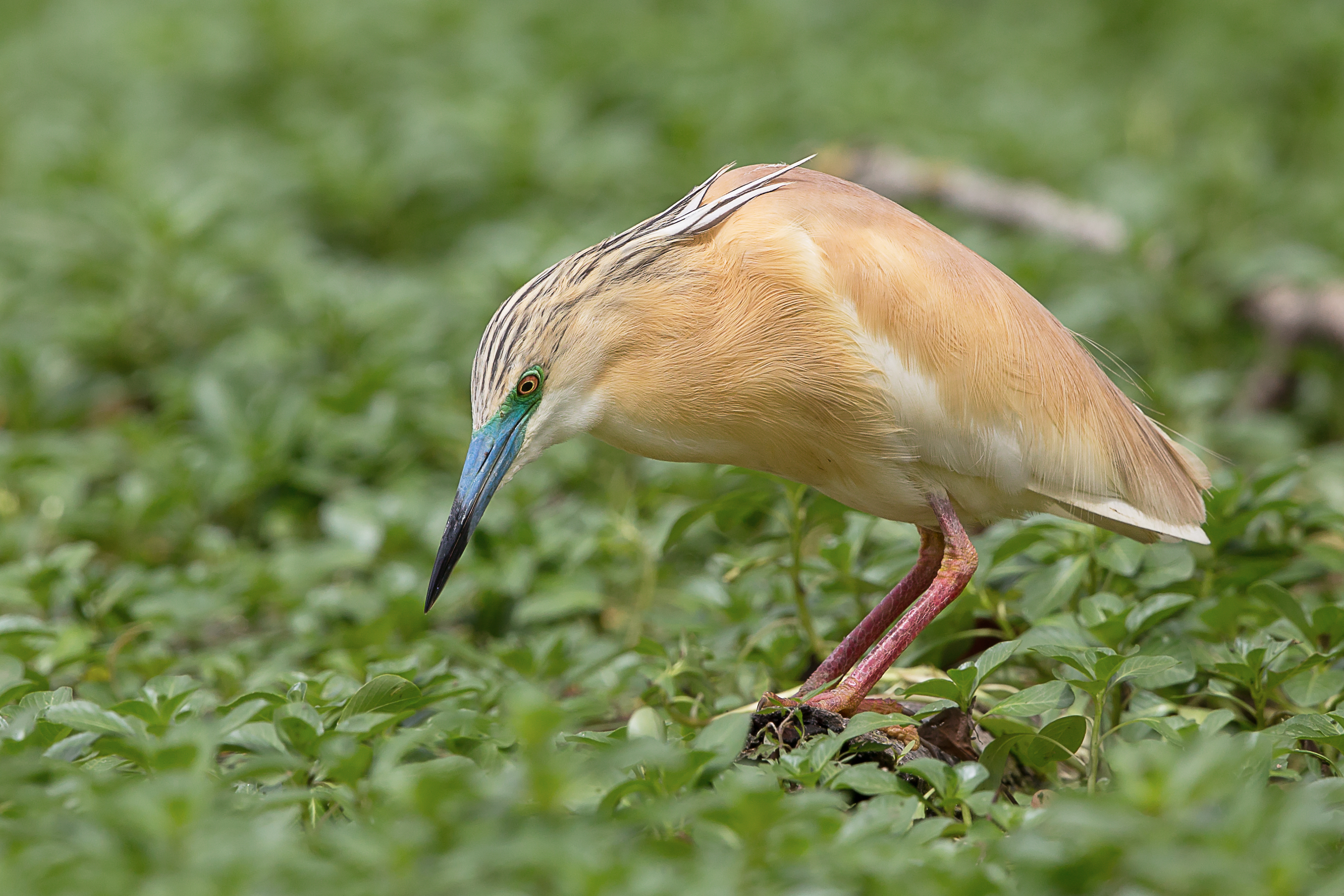
squacco heron
