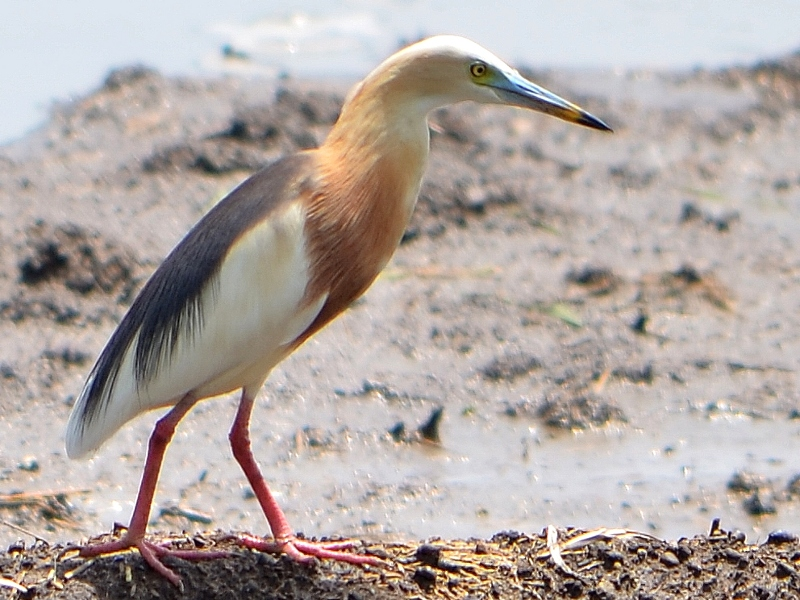
- Breeding plumage

Conservation status
- Least Concern (IUCN 3.1)

Scientific classification
- Kingdom: Animalia
- Phylum: Chordata
- Class: Aves
- Order: Pelecaniformes
- Family: Ardeidae
- Genus: Ardeola
- Species: A. speciosa

Binomial name
- Ardeola speciosa (Horsfield, 1821)

= Javan pond heron =

Species of bird

The Javan pond heron (Ardeola speciosa) is a wading bird of the heron family, found in shallow fresh and salt-water wetlands in Southeast Asia. Its diet comprises insects, fish, and crabs.

The Javan pond heron is typically 45 cm long with white wings, a yellow bill with a black tip, yellow eyes and legs. Its overall colour is orange, slaty and white during mating season, and brown and flecked with white out of the mating season. The non-breeding plumage is similar to that of the Chinese and Indian pond herons and is virtually indistinguishable in the field. It breeds from June to September. It is migratory.

Widespread throughout its large range, the Javan pond heron is evaluated as Least Concern on the IUCN Red List of Threatened Species.

== Gallery ==
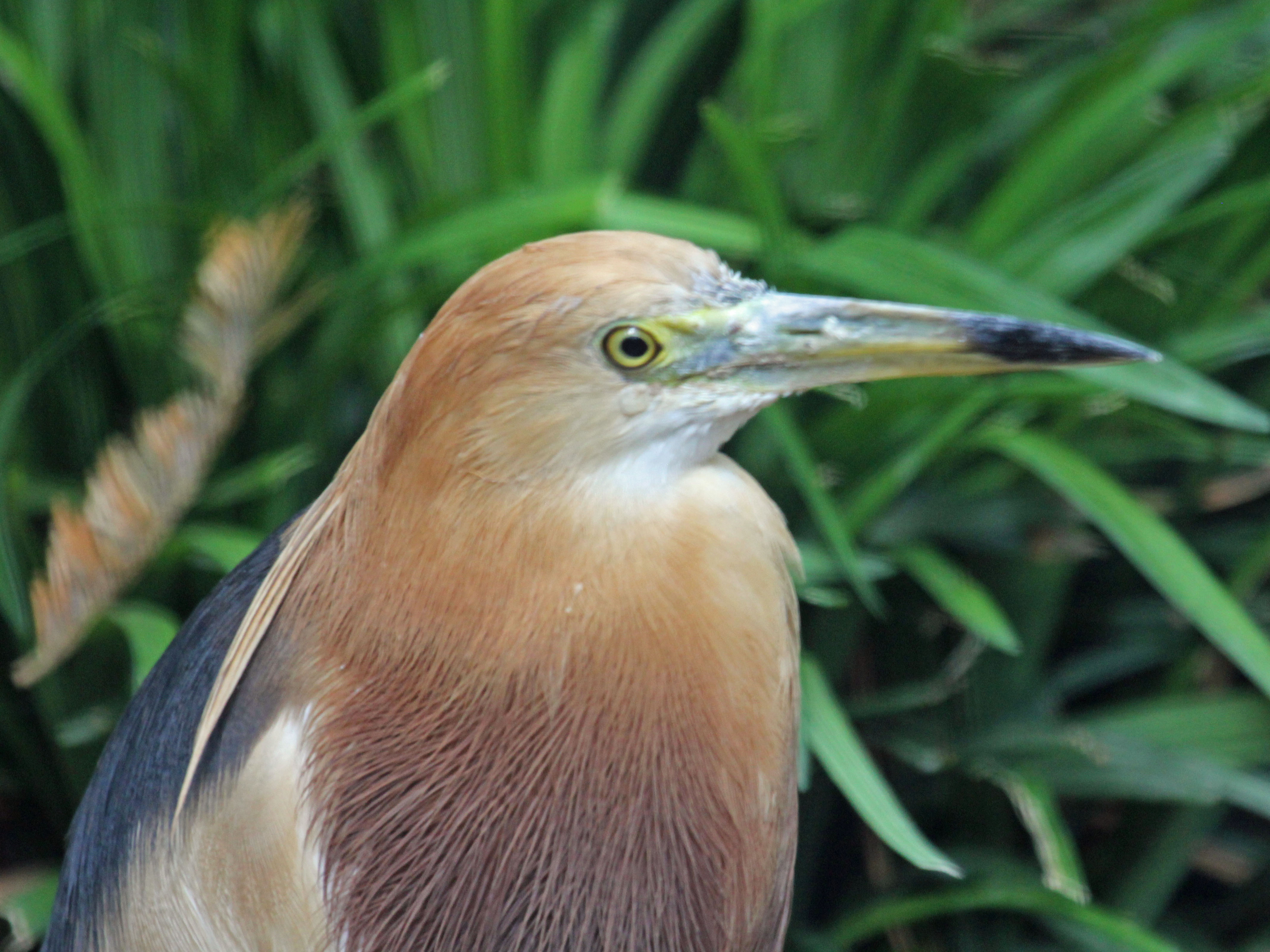
Breeding adult

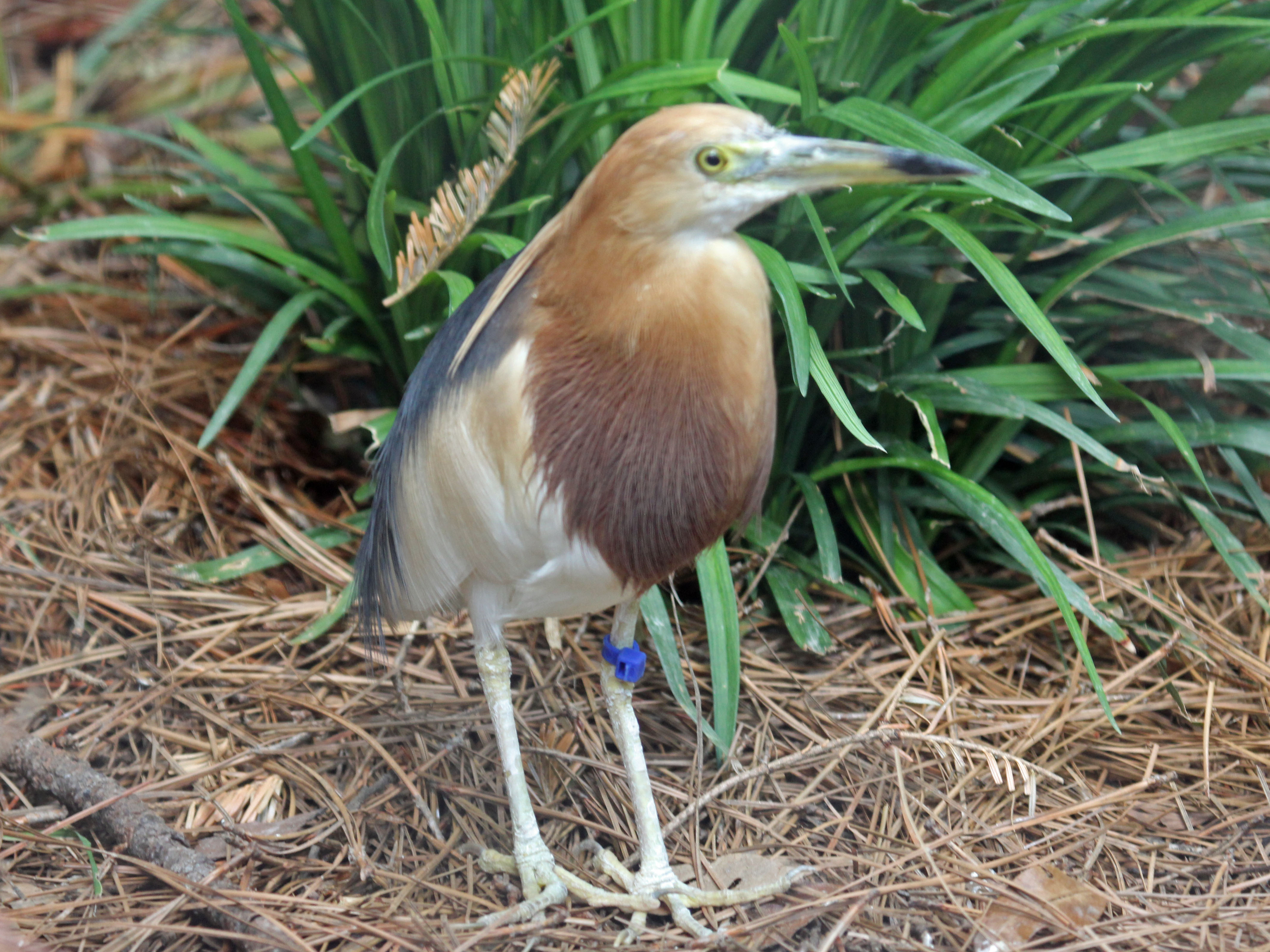
Breeding adult

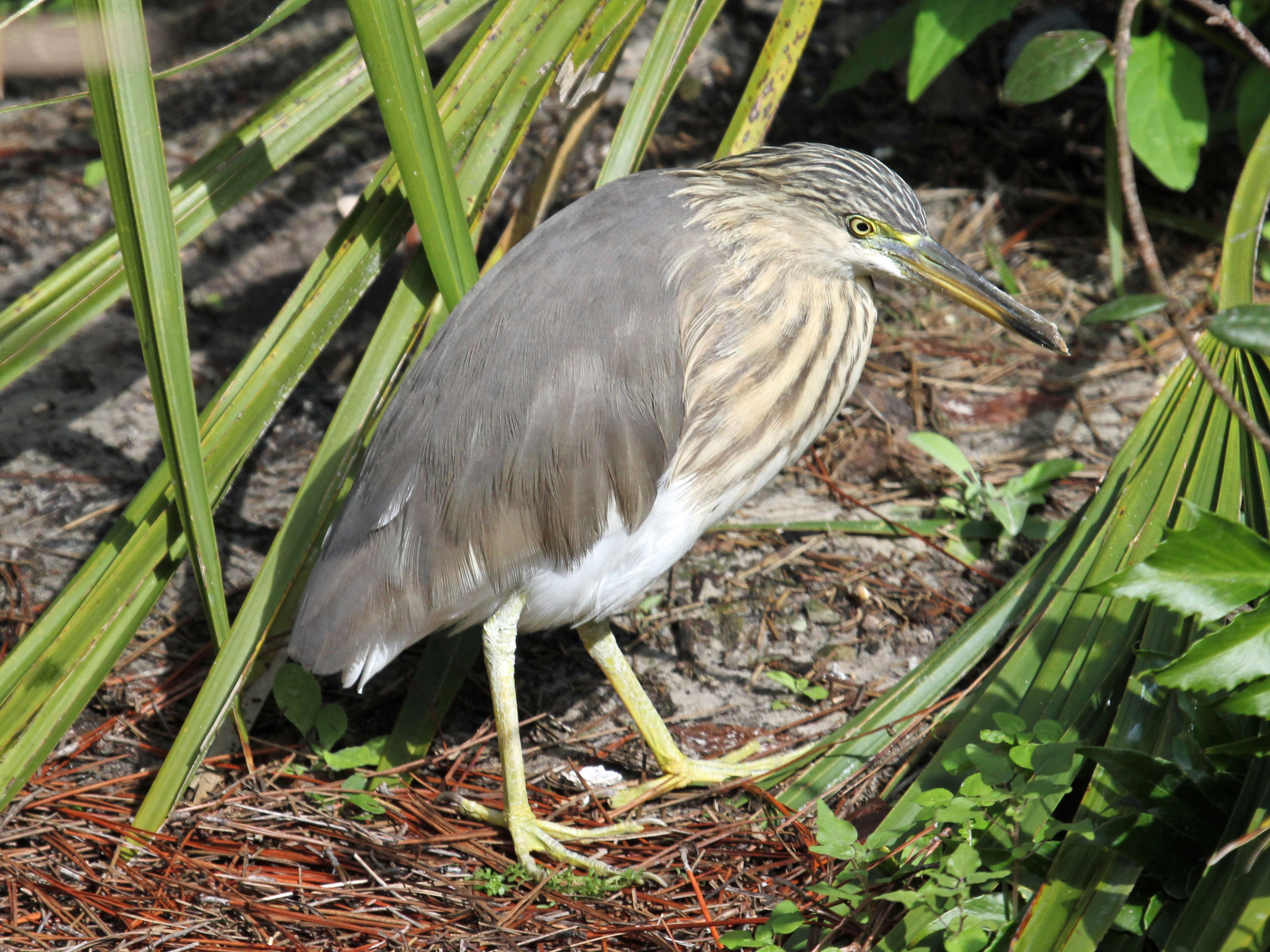
Nonbreeding adult

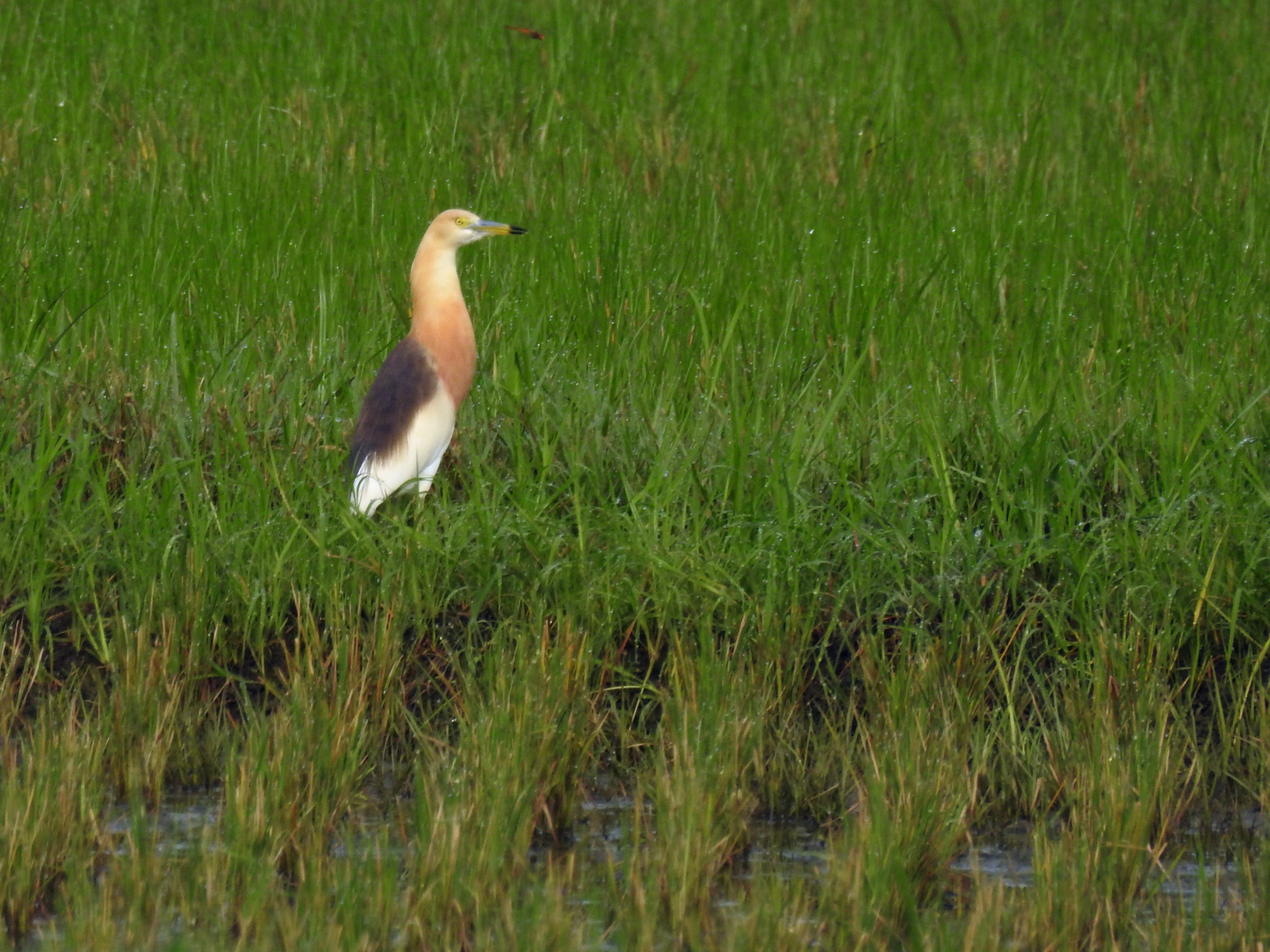
In paddyfield habitat, Sulawesi
