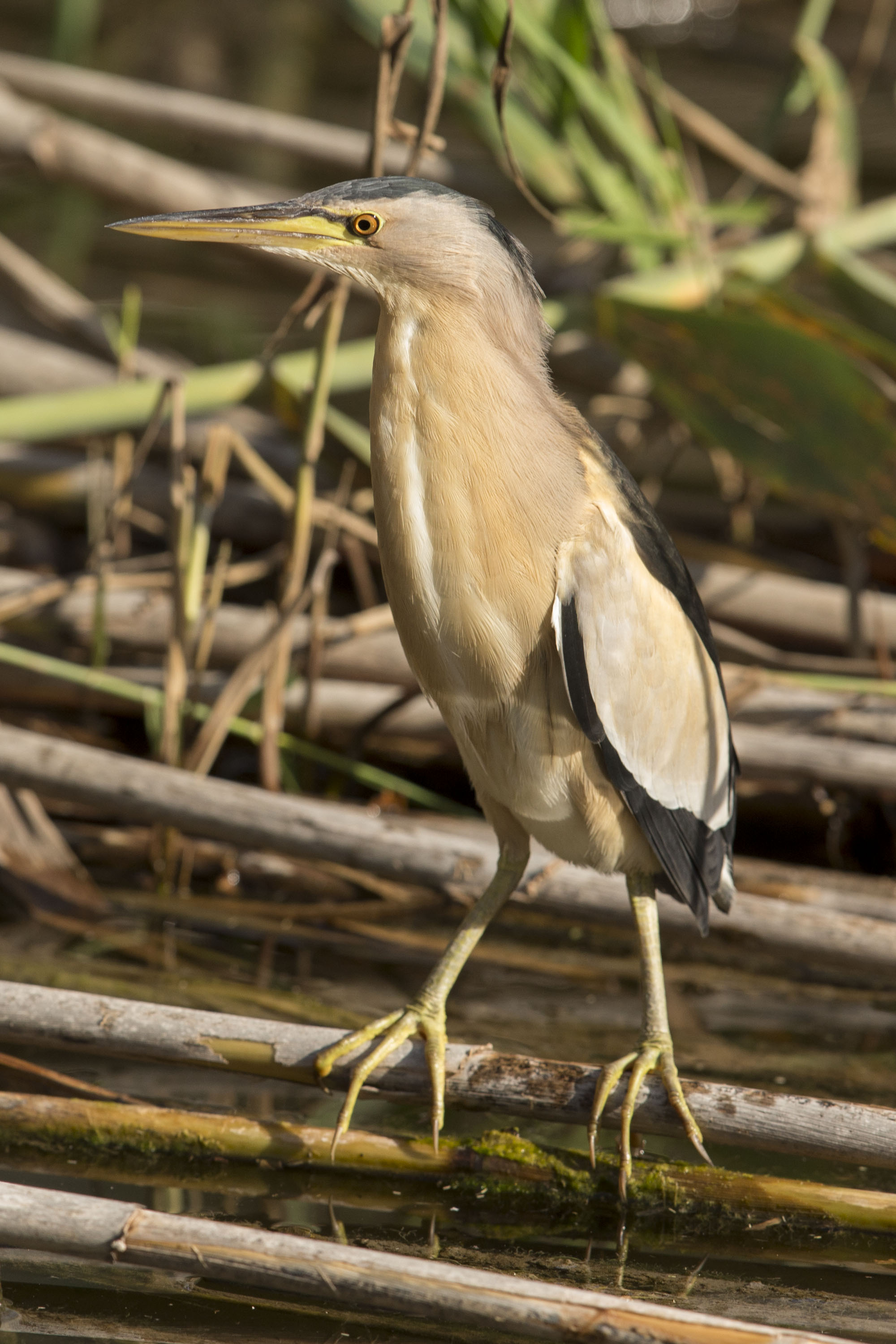
- A little bittern in Majorca, Spain

Conservation status
- Least Concern (IUCN 3.1)

Scientific classification
- Kingdom: Animalia
- Phylum: Chordata
- Class: Aves
- Order: Pelecaniformes
- Family: Ardeidae
- Genus: Botaurus
- Species: B. minutus

Binomial name
- Botaurus minutus (Linnaeus, 1766)
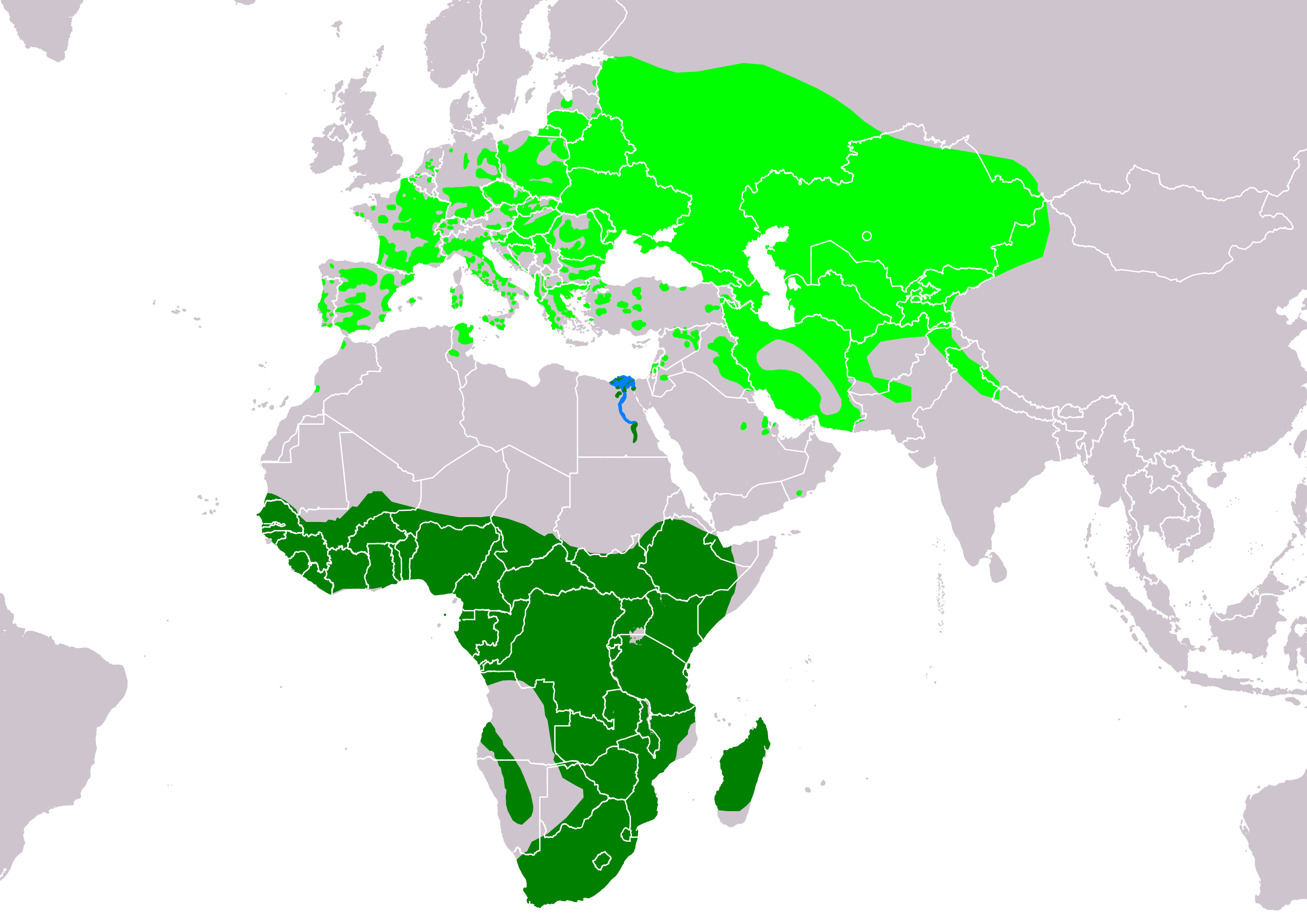
- Range of B. minutus Breeding Resident Non-breeding

Synonyms
- Ardea minuta Linnaeus, 1766

= Little bittern =

Species of bird

The little bittern (Botaurus minutus) is a wading bird in the heron family, Ardeidae. This species was formerly placed in the genus Ixobrychus.

== Taxonomy ==
The little bittern was formally described by the Swedish naturalist Carl Linnaeus in 1766 in the twelfth edition of his Systema Naturae under the binomial name Ardea minuta. Linnaeus specified the type locality as "Helvetia, Aleppo" but this is now restricted to Switzerland. The little bittern was formerly placed in the genus Ixobrychus. A molecular phylogenetic study of the heron family Ardeidae published in 2023 found that Ixobrychus was paraphyletic and to create monophyletic genera, Ixobrychus was merged into the genus Botaurus that had been introduced in 1819 by the English naturalist James Francis Stephens.

Three subspecies are recognised:

- B. m. minutus (Linnaeus, 1766) – breeds in central, south Europe to central Asia and northwest India; winters in Africa
- B. m. payesii (Hartlaub, 1858) – Africa south of the Sahara
- B. m. podiceps (Bonaparte, 1855) – Madagascar

The Australian black-backed bittern (Botaurus dubius) and the extinct New Zealand bittern (Botaurus novaezelandiae) were formerly considered subspecies of the little bittern.

== Description ==
The little bittern has a length of 33–38 centimetres (13–15 in) and a wing span of 52–58 centimetres (20–23 in). It is the smallest of the breeding herons of Europe and is characterised by its tiny size, long and sharp bill and thick neck. The males are distinctively patterned and both sexes show pale forewing panels. The males have black with a faint green sheen on the crown, nape, back, tail and scapulars. The underparts are pale buff and the wing has a pinkish buff oval shaped panel which contrasts with the otherwise black wings and is formed by the inner wing coverts. The underwing is completely whiteish in colour. The female is duller than the male and has brownish black upperparts with paler feather margins visible at close range. The underparts of the female are not as clean as those of the male and are streaked with dark buff and brown. The female's wing panel is less obvious than the male's. The juveniles are duller and more rufous than the females and are more heavily streaked on both their upperparts and underparts, including their wing coverts.

== Distribution ==
The little bittern is native to the Old World, breeding in Africa, central and southern Europe, western and southern Asia, and Madagascar. Birds from temperate regions in Europe and western Asia are migratory, wintering in Africa and further south in Asia, while those nesting in the tropics are sedentary. It is rare north of its breeding range.

In Britain there were intermittent reports of breeding in the nineteenth century, and again in 1946 and 1957, but none of these records were proven. The first proven British breeding record is from Yorkshire in 1984, and the second from the Avalon Marshes in Somerset in 2010, by 2017 this species had been present in this area for nine consecutive years.

== Behaviour ==
The little bittern is crepuscular, skulking and normally solitary. It feeds on fishes, amphibians and insects which are caught within reedbeds or at their edges by the bird slowly stalking the prey. The male claims a territory in the Spring, advertising his presence with a deep barking or croaking call and the monogamous pair remain together for at least one breeding season. Eggs are laid in a nest situated in dense reedbeds, rushes or bushes above the water from the middle of May and there is a single brood which is normally 5-6 eggs. These are incubated for 17–19 days and the chicks are fledged after 25–30 days.

In Europe the little bittern is a migratory species, crossing the Mediterranean from Africa in the early Spring and arriving in their breeding wetlands from mid April onwards. The return to Africa occurs in August and September and there are normally only a few juveniles left in Europe by October. The European breeders migrate as far south as the Eastern Cape and Transvaal.

The little bittern is a host of the Acanthocephalan intestinal parasite Ardeirhynchus spiralis.

== Conservation status ==
Little Bitterns were once widespread in Central Europe. In the meantime it is a poorly distributed breeding bird of the lowlands, sporadically up to low mountain ranges. It occurs from Europe (without regular breeding in Great Britain, Ireland or Scandinavia) to West Siberia up to 56° N. It also occurs in North Africa and southern Iran and south of the Sahara to southern Africa. Isolated populations also exist in Madagascar and Australia. The total population of Europe is about 60,000-120,000 breeding pairs, with occurrences of> 5000 breeding pairs in Russia, Ukraine, Romania and Turkey. In Central Europe (around 2000) about 5300-7800 pairs are breeding, most of it in Hungary. The formerly large population in Germany has decreased to just over 100 breeding pairs. However, inventory information is particularly unreliable for this very secret species.

The little bittern is one of the species to which the Agreement on the Conservation of African-Eurasian Migratory Waterbirds applies.

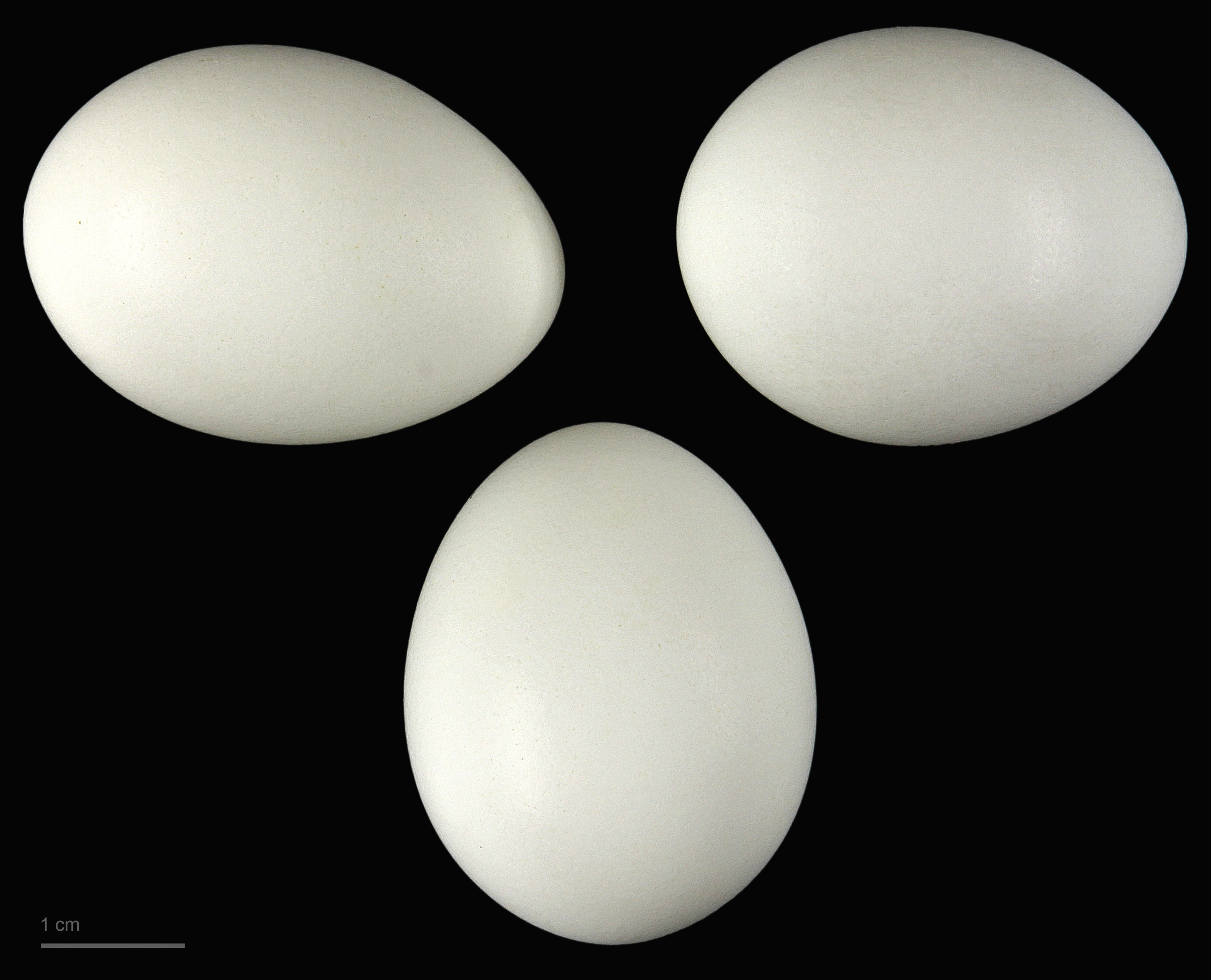
Eggs at the Museum of Toulouse

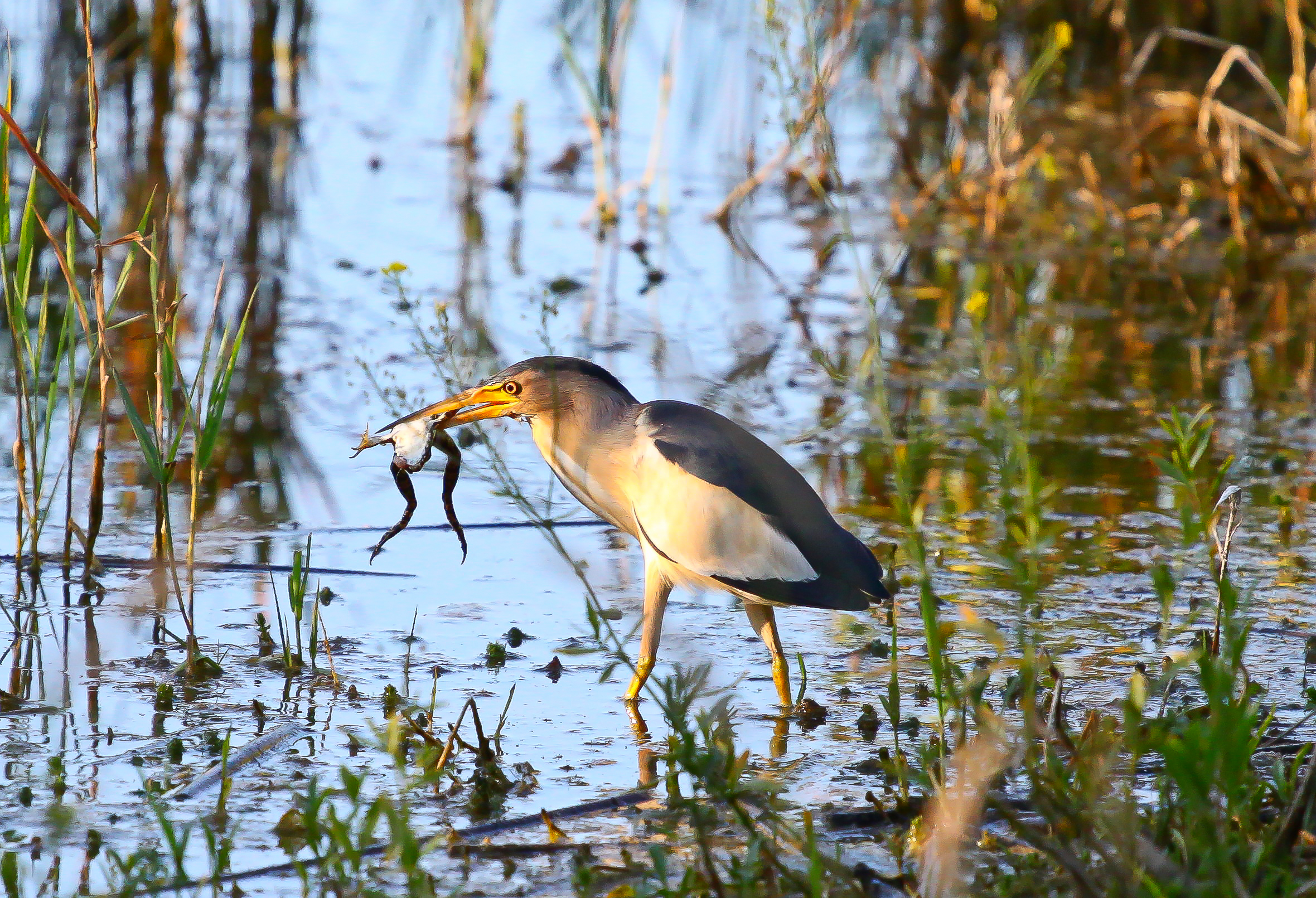
With a frog in the Aldomirovtsi Marsh, Bulgaria

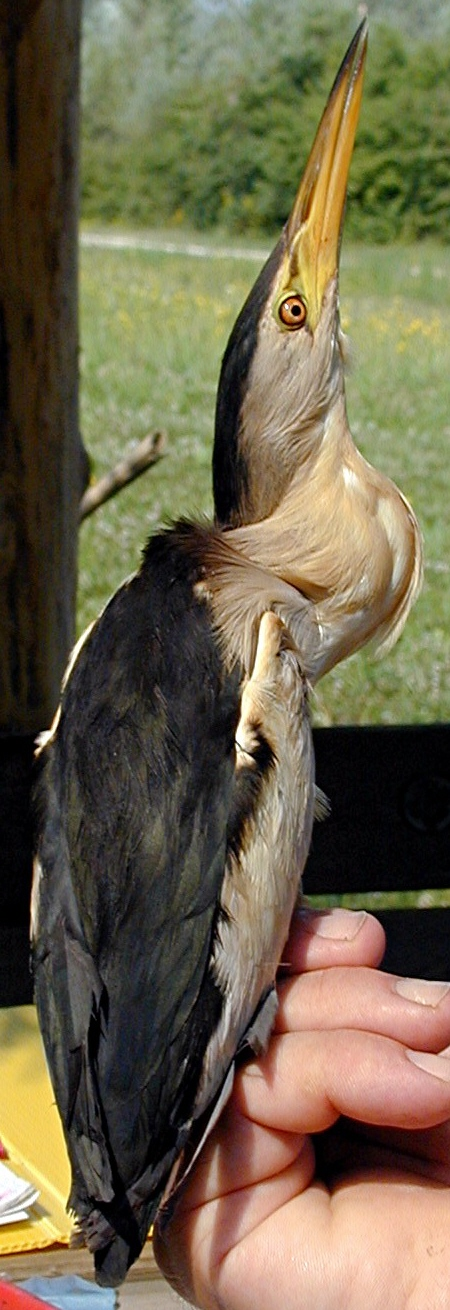
An adult during ringing in Northern Italy
