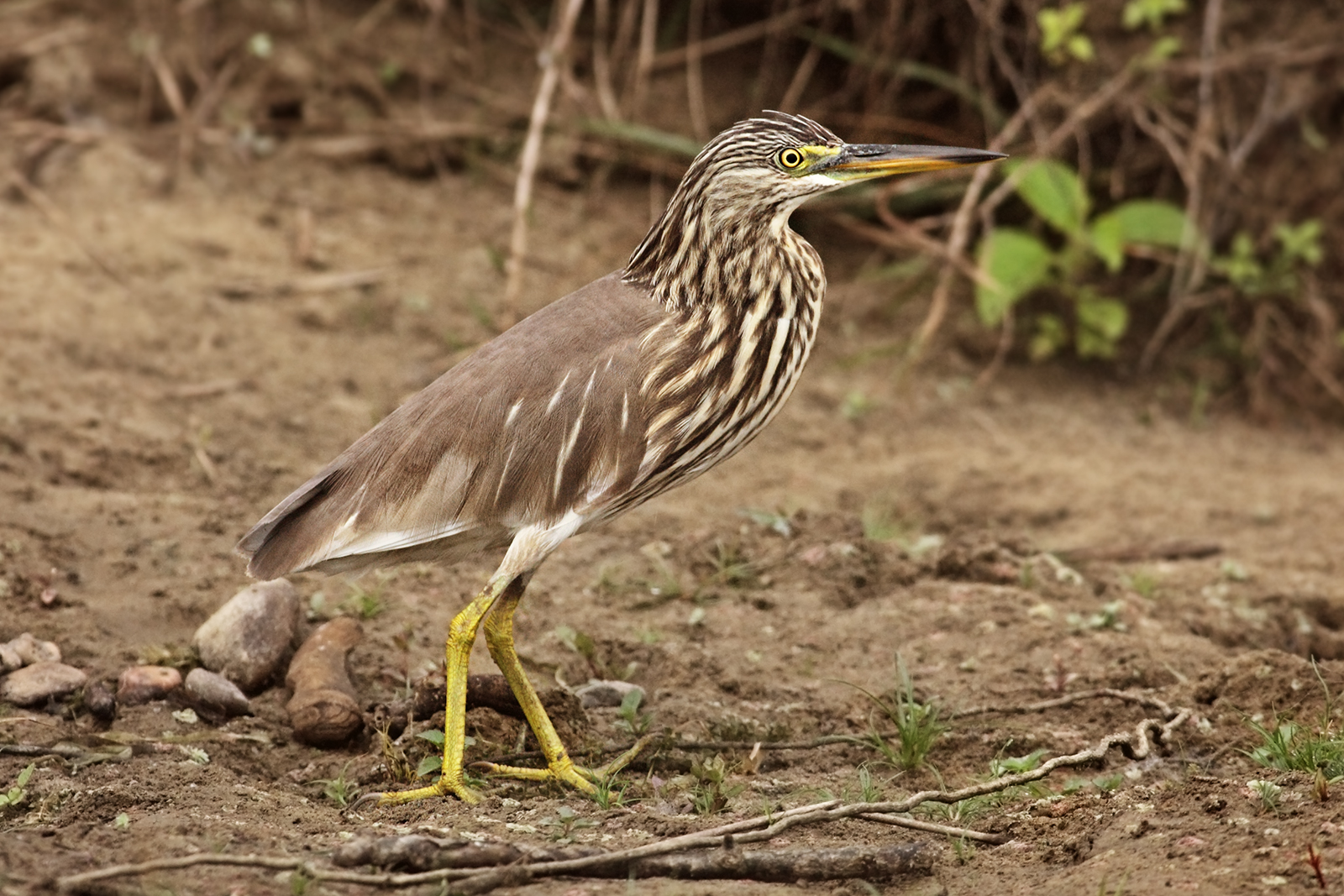
- Indian pond heron (Ardeola grayii)

Scientific classification
- Kingdom: Animalia
- Phylum: Chordata
- Class: Aves
- Order: Pelecaniformes
- Family: Ardeidae
- Subfamily: Ardeinae
- Genus: Ardeola; F. Boie, 1822

Type species
- Ardea ralloides

Species
- See text

= Pond heron =

Genus of birds

Pond herons (Ardeola) are herons, typically 40–50 cm (16–20 in) long with an 80–100 cm (30–40 in) wingspan. Most breed in the tropical Old World, but the migratory squacco heron occurs in southern Europe and the Middle East and winters in Africa. The scientific name comes from Latin ardeola, a small heron (ardea).

These pond herons are stocky species with a short neck, short thick bill, typically buff or brownish back, and coloured or streaked fore neck and breast. In summer, adults may have long neck feathers. Ardeola herons are transformed in flight, looking very white due to the brilliant white wings.

Their breeding habitat is marshy wetlands. They nest in small colonies, often with other wading birds, usually on platforms of sticks in trees or shrubs. Two to five eggs are laid.

These herons feed on insects, fish and amphibians. They are often found on small ponds giving rise to the English name shared by most of the species.

Image	Name	Common name	Distribution
	Ardeola grayii	Indian pond heron	southern Iran and east to Pakistan, India, Burma, Bangladesh and Sri Lanka
	Ardeola ralloides	Squacco heron	southern Europe, Greater Middle East and Africa
	Ardeola bacchus	Chinese pond heron	Breeds in eastern China, Japan and adjacent areas; spends non-breeding season in far southern China and southeast Asia
	Ardeola speciosa	Javan pond heron	Mainland Southeast Asia, the Sunda Islands and southern Philippines
	Ardeola idae	Malagasy pond heron	Breeds in Madagascar, Réunion and Seychelles; spends non-breeding season in eastern mainland Africa
	Ardeola rufiventris	Rufous-bellied heron	Africa: Angola, Botswana, Burundi, Democratic Republic of the Congo, Kenya, Lesotho, Malawi, Mali, Mozambique, Namibia, Rwanda, South Africa, Swaziland, Tanzania, Uganda, Zambia and Zimbabwe

== Diet ==
Pond herons are carnivorous. Though pond herons often live near freshwater bodies and consume aquatic prey, they often hunt terrestrially as well. Though the majority of their diet mainly consists of insects, fish, and amphibians supplemented sometimes by molluscs and invertebrates, they are known to opportunistically prey on birds and mammals. Pond herons are typically generalists. Pond herons exhibit a wide variety of predation strategies. They are known to employ the ‘stand and wait’ technique, which involves standing on both legs in either an upright or crouched position and waiting for prey to appear. They also employ the ‘walk slowly’ strategy, in which the heron will walk slowly to stalk and ambush prey. Some pond herons perform unique strategies such as ‘hovering’, which has been observed in the Indian pond heron, Chinese pond heron, and Javan pond heron. 'Hovering' requires that a bird maintain flight over an area for a few seconds before diving to catch prey. Pond heron species’ hunt at a wide variety of times of day.

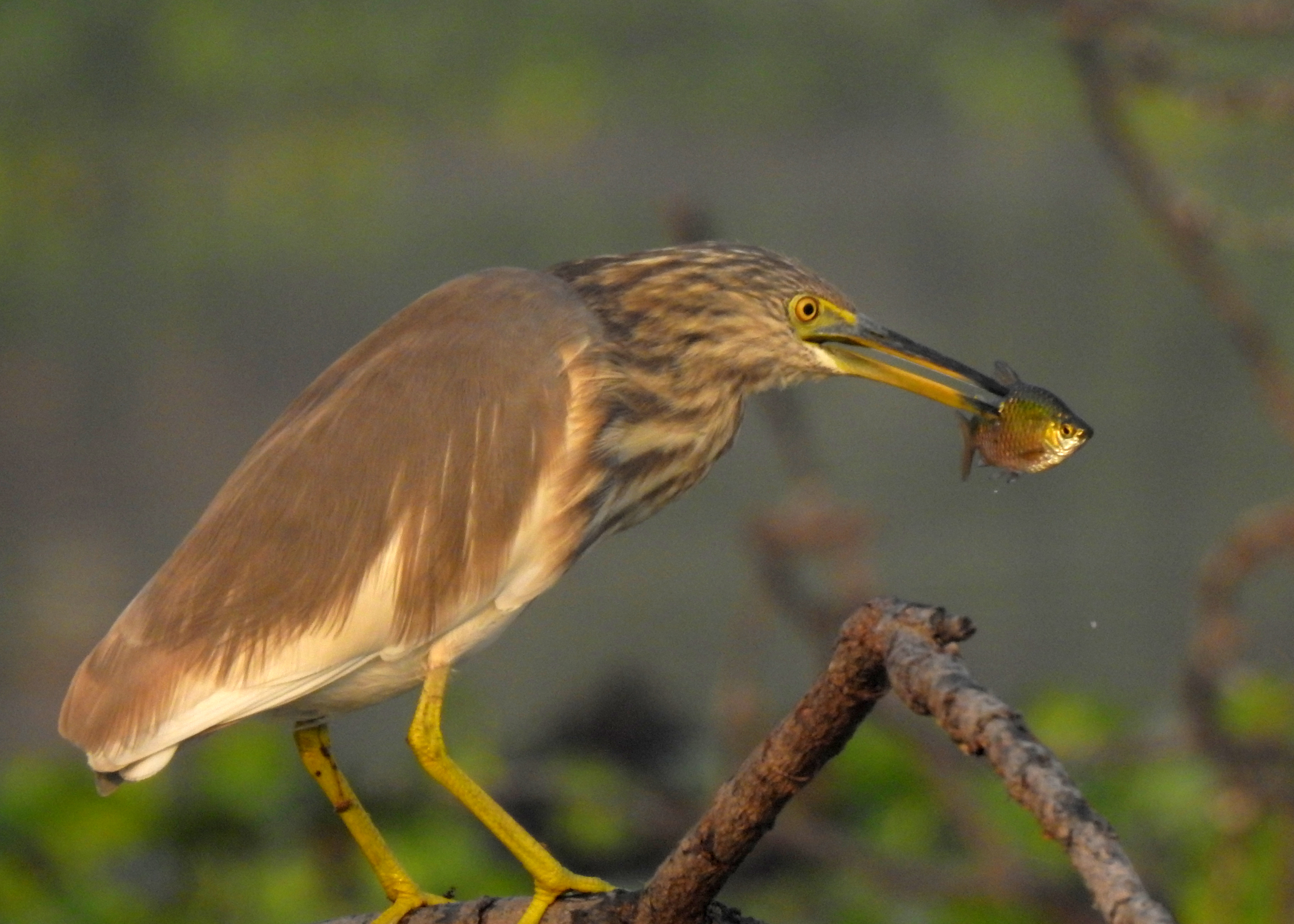
Indian pond heron catching a fish

The Indian pond heron prefers to eat insects. It supplements its diet with fish, amphibians, annelids, and molluscs. The Indian pond heron practices a variety of predation techniques including using surprise attacks, walk fast and strike, fish baiting, scavenging, 'stand and wait', probing, and floating. The Indian pond heron hunts during the morning and late afternoon.

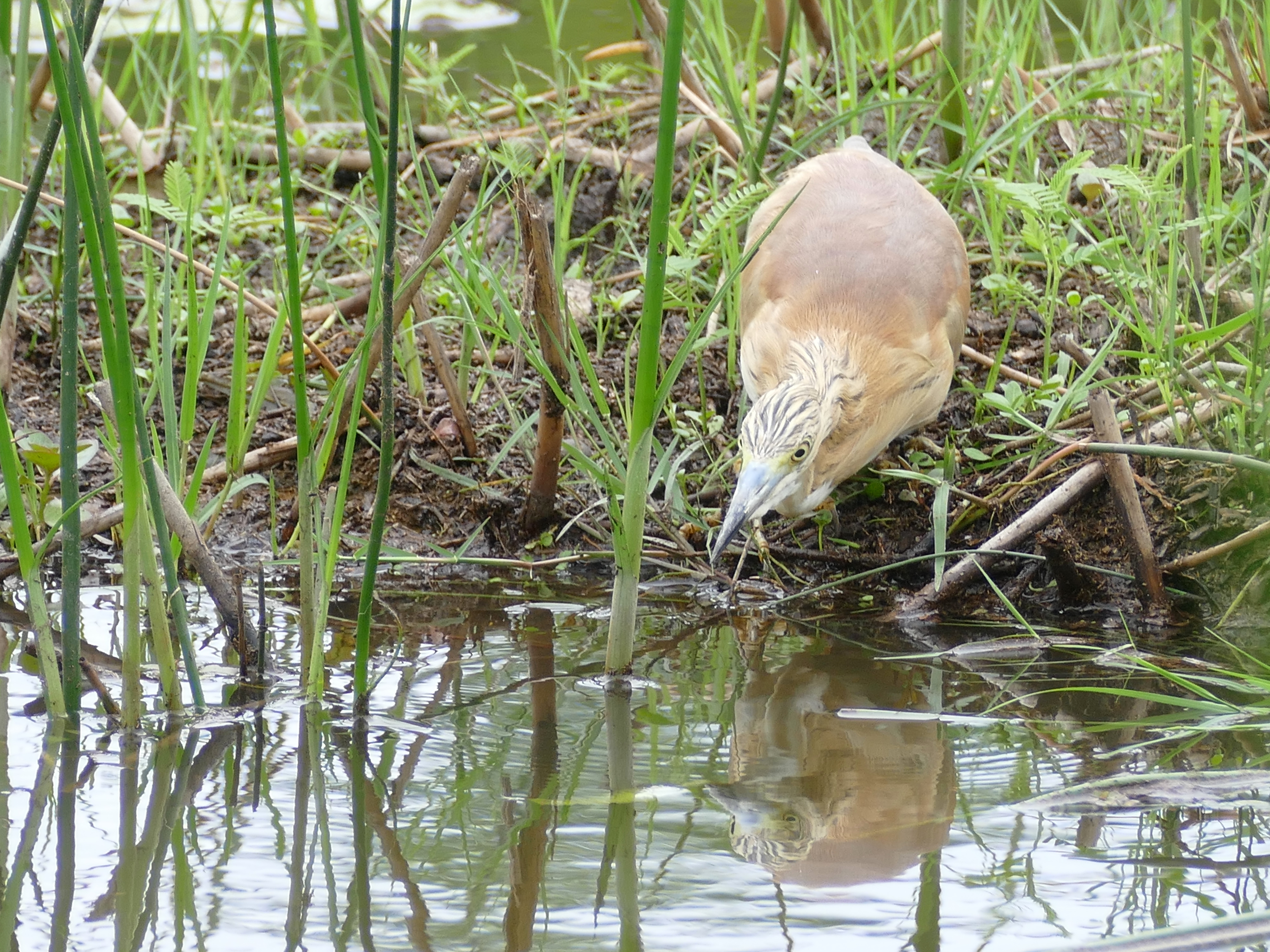
Squacco heron using 'stand and wait' technique to stalk prey

Squacco herons mainly prey on fish. They supplement their diets with amphibians such as frogs. They eat smaller birds opportunistically. Squacco herons can be aggressive against other herons when hunting for prey. They can perform niche partitioning when competing with other heron species and will often consume smaller varieties of prey. Squacco herons have been known to use bait such as insects to lure minnows to surface waters. They perform predation techniques such as ‘stand and wait’ and ‘walk slowly’. They prefer to hunt at dusk and dawn.

The Chinese pond heron opportunistically preys on birds such as the swallow. It employs ‘stand and wait’ and ‘walk slowly’ hunting techniques. It feeds at dusk and dawn.

The Javan pond heron eats insects such as grasshoppers, beetles, ants, and termites. It also feeds on fish and frogs. It typically uses the ‘stand and wait’ and ‘walk slowly’ hunting techniques. It prefers to hunt during the morning and evening.

The Malagasy pond heron mainly eats insects. Their diet is supplemented by other invertebrates, fish, amphibians, and reptiles. It uses the 'stand and wait' and 'walk slowly' hunting techniques.

The Rufous-bellied heron consumes a diet consisting of annelids, insects, crustaceans, frogs, and fish. They hunt by ‘walking slowly’. They mainly hunt during the day but sometimes hunt at night.
