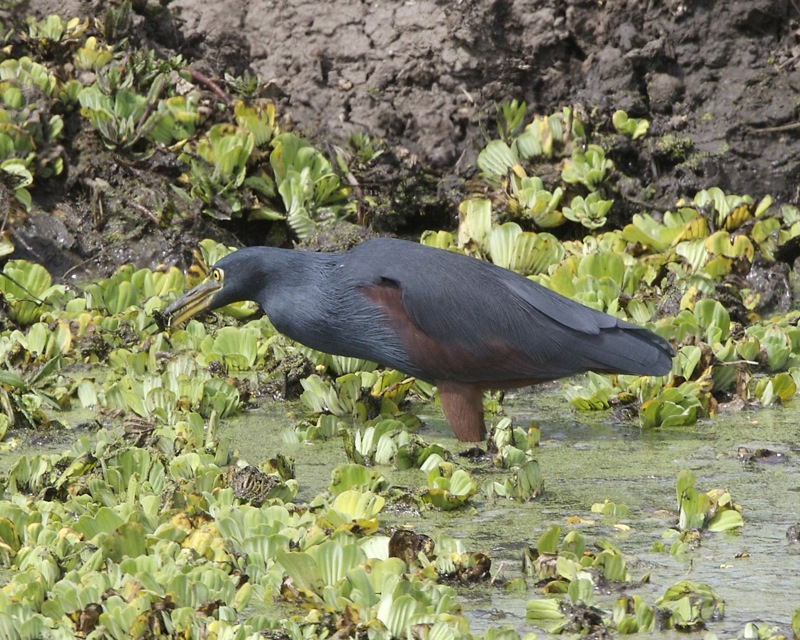

Conservation status
- Least Concern (IUCN 3.1)

Scientific classification
- Kingdom: Animalia
- Phylum: Chordata
- Class: Aves
- Order: Pelecaniformes
- Family: Ardeidae
- Genus: Ardeola
- Species: A. rufiventris

Binomial name
- Ardeola rufiventris (Sundevall, 1850)
- resident range

Synonyms
- Ardea rufiventris Sundevall, 1850

= Rufous-bellied heron =

Species of bird

The rufous-bellied heron (Ardeola rufiventris) is a species of heron in the genus Ardeola, the pond herons, of the family Ardeidae. It is found in southern Africa.

== Taxonomy ==
The rufous-bellied heron was formally described in 1850 by the Swedish zoologist Carl Jakob Sundevall from specimens collected along the Mooi River near Potchefstroom in South Africa. Sundevall coined the binomial name Ardea rufiventris. The specific epithet rufiventris combines Latin rufus meaning "ruddy" or "rufous" with venter, ventris meaning "belly". The rufous-bellied heron is now placed in the genus Ardeola that was introduced in 1822 by the German naturalist Friedrich Boie. The species is monotypic: no subspecies are recognised.

== Description ==
This is a small dark species of heron with a dark grey head, back and breast contrasting with a rufous belly, wings and tail. When seen in flight the bright yellow legs and feet contrast with the dark feathers of the underside of the body. Juveniles are paler and browner, darkening as they mature.

== Distribution and habitat ==
It is found in eastern, central and southern sub-Saharan Africa widespread although absent from the arid south-west and is found in Angola, Botswana, Burundi, Democratic Republic of the Congo, Eswatini, Kenya, Lesotho, Malawi, Mali, Mozambique, Namibia, Rwanda, South Africa, Tanzania, Uganda, Zambia, and Zimbabwe.

It is found in seasonally flooded grasslands, marshes, flood-plains and inland deltas (e.g. the Okavango Delta), shallow water along riverbanks and lake shores, stands of papyrus, reedbeds and paddies.

== Behaviour ==
This is a skulking species which when hiding assumes a bittern-like posture but with its bill in a horizontal rather than vertical position. It usually prefers to hunt on the landward side of well vegetated wetlands and in the shallow water. It is a largely sedentary species, which may make partial migratory movements to follow rainy season inundations of flood-plains.

=== Breeding ===
Breeding occurs during the rainy season, or when flooding is at a peak where this occurs early in the dry season. It nests colonially in mixed colonies, typically in small groups of 6-30 pairs, although at Lake Bangwelu in Zambia, groups of 60-80 pairs have been recorded. Rufous-bellied herons feed during the day but will sometimes forage at night, normally they hunt alone or in small flocks of no more than five individuals, although aggregations of over 120 have been recorded. It prefers to roost in trees. The nest is a small platform of vegetation positioned low in reeds, trees or shrubs that are normally positioned over standing water. In mixed-species colonies rufous-bellied herons normally nest around the edges.

=== Food and feeding ===
The diet consists mainly of small fish such as tilapia and barbus, amphibians, crustaceans, aquatic insects and other aquatic invertebrates.
