= Arhythmorhynchus =

Scientific classification
- Kingdom: Animalia
- Phylum: Acanthocephala
- Class: Palaeacanthocephala
- Order: Polymorphida
- Family: Polymorphidae
- Genus: Arhythmorhynchus; Lühe, 1911

Genus of worms

Arhythmorhynchus is a genus of parasitic worms in Acanthocephala (thorny-headed worms, also known as spiny-headed worms) belonging to the family Polymorphidae.

== Taxonomy ==
The genus was described by Lühe in 1911. The National Center for Biotechnology Information does not indicate that any phylogenetic analysis has been published on any Arhythmorhynchus species that would confirm its position as a unique genus in the family Polymorphidae.

== Description ==
Arhythmorhynchus species consist of a proboscis covered in hooks and a long trunk.

== Species ==
The genus Arhythmorhynchus contains many species.

- Arhythmorhynchus capellae (Yamaguti, 1935)
- Arhythmorhynchus comptus Van Cleave & Rausch, 1950
- Arhythmorhynchus distinctus Baer, 1956
- Arhythmorhynchus eroliae (Yamaguti, 1939)
- Arhythmorhynchus frassoni (Molin, 1858)
- Arhythmorhynchus frontospinosus (Tubangui, 1935)
- Arhythmorhynchus jeffreyi Schmidt, 1973
- Arhythmorhynchus johnstoni Golvan, 1960
- Arhythmorhynchus limosae Edmonds, 1971
- Arhythmorhynchus petrotschenkoi (Schmidt, 1969) Atrashkevich, 1979
- Arhythmorhynchus plicatus (von Linstow, 1883)
- Arhythmorhynchus pumilirostris Van Cleave, 1916
- Arhythmorhynchus rubicundus (Molin, 1859)
- Arhythmorhynchus siluricola Dollfus, 1929
- Arhythmorhynchus suecicus Lundström, 1942
- Arhythmorhynchus teres Van Cleave, 1921
- Arhythmorhynchus tigrinus Moghe & Das, 1953
- Arhythmorhynchus trichocephalus (Leuckart, 1876)
- Arhythmorhynchus tringi Gubanov, 1952
- Arhythmorhynchus turbidus (Van Cleave, 1937)
- Arhythmorhynchus uncinatus (Kaiser, 1893)
- Arhythmorhynchus villoti Golvan, 1994
- Arhythmorhynchus xeni Atrashkevich, 1978

== Distribution ==
The distribution of Arhythmorhynchus is determined by that of its hosts. The species of this genus are found in Europe and Northern America.

== Hosts ==
Life cycle of Acanthocephala. (Note: There are no known aberrant human infections for Arhythmorhynchus species.)

The life cycle of an acanthocephalan consists of three stages beginning when an infective acanthor (development of an egg) is released from the intestines of the definitive host and then ingested by an arthropod, the intermediate host. The intermediate hosts of Arhythmorhynchus are arthropods. When the acanthor molts, the second stage called the acanthella begins. This stage involves penetrating the wall of the mesenteron or the intestine of the intermediate host and growing. The final stage is the infective cystacanth which is the larval or juvenile state of an Acanthocephalan, differing from the adult only in size and stage of sexual development. The cystacanths within the intermediate hosts are consumed by the definitive host, usually attaching to the walls of the intestines, and as adults they reproduce sexually in the intestines. The acanthor is passed in the feces of the definitive host and the cycle repeats. There may be paratenic hosts (hosts where parasites infest but do not undergo larval development or sexual reproduction) for xx.

Arhythmorhynchus parasitizes animals. There are no reported cases of Arhythmorhynchus infesting humans in the English language medical literature.

Hosts for Arhythmorhynchus species

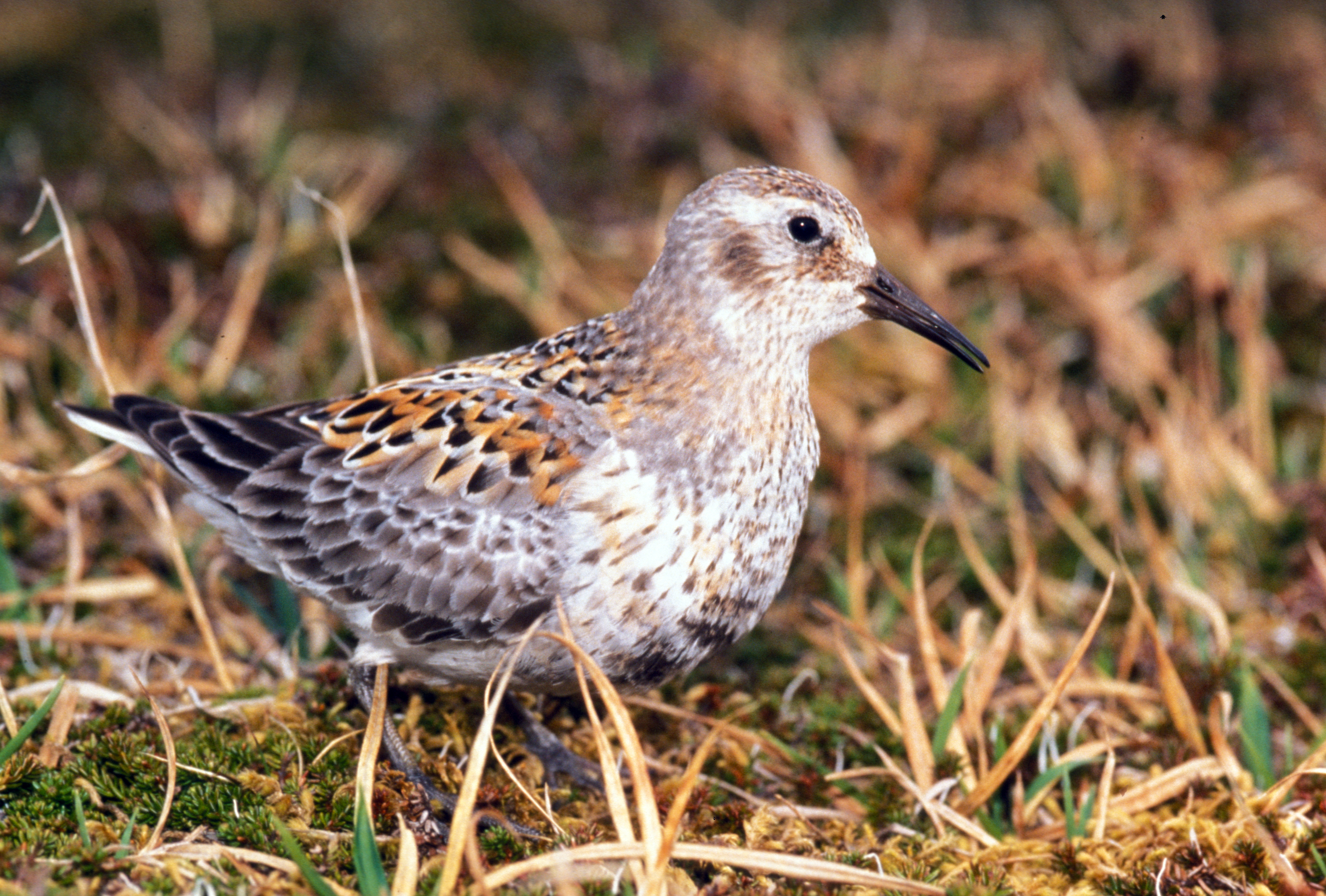
The Rock sandpiper is a host of A. comptus
