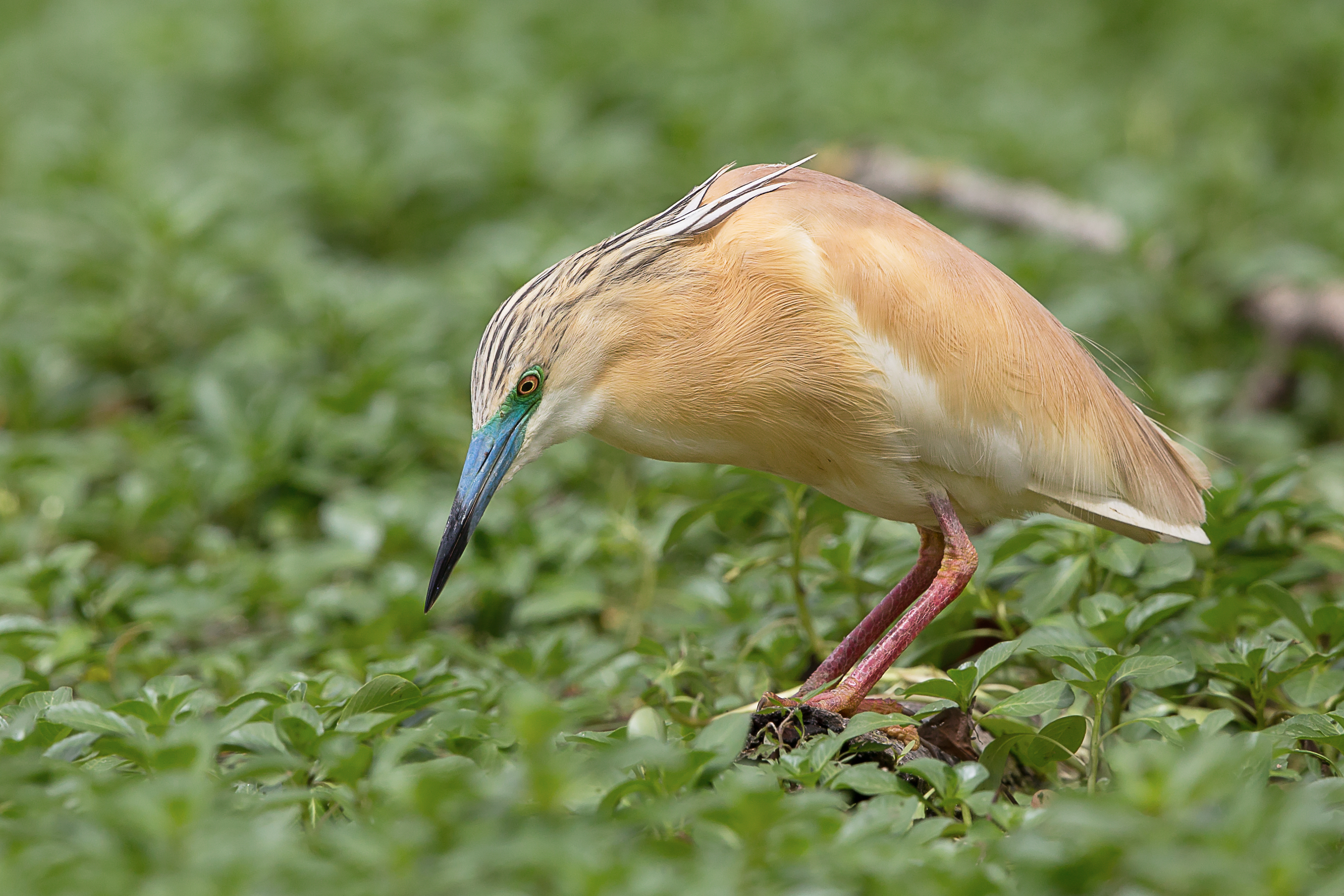
- Ariège, France

Conservation status
- Least Concern (IUCN 3.1)

Scientific classification
- Kingdom: Animalia
- Phylum: Chordata
- Class: Aves
- Order: Pelecaniformes
- Family: Ardeidae
- Genus: Ardeola
- Species: A. ralloides

Binomial name
- Ardeola ralloides (Scopoli, 1769)
- Range of A. ralloides Breeding range Year-round range Wintering range

= Squacco heron =

Species of bird

The squacco heron (Ardeola ralloides) is a small heron, 44–47 cm (17 1/2–18 1/2 in) long, of which the body is 20–23 cm (8–9 in), with 80–92 cm (31 1/2–36 in) wingspan. It is of Old World origins, breeding in southern Europe and the Greater Middle East.

== Behaviour ==
The squacco heron is a migrant, wintering in Africa. It is rare north of its breeding range. The species has been recorded in Fernando de Noronha islands, and more rarely in mainland South America, as a vagrant.

This is a stocky species with a short neck, short thick bill and buff-brown back. In summer, adults have long neck feathers. Its appearance is transformed in flight, when it looks very white due to the colour of the wings.

The squacco heron's breeding habitat is marshy wetlands in warm countries. The birds nest in small colonies, often with other wading birds, usually on platforms of sticks in trees or shrubs. Three to four eggs are laid. They feed on fish, frogs and insects. The squacco heron is a host of the Acanthocephalan intestinal parasite Ardeirhynchus spiralis.

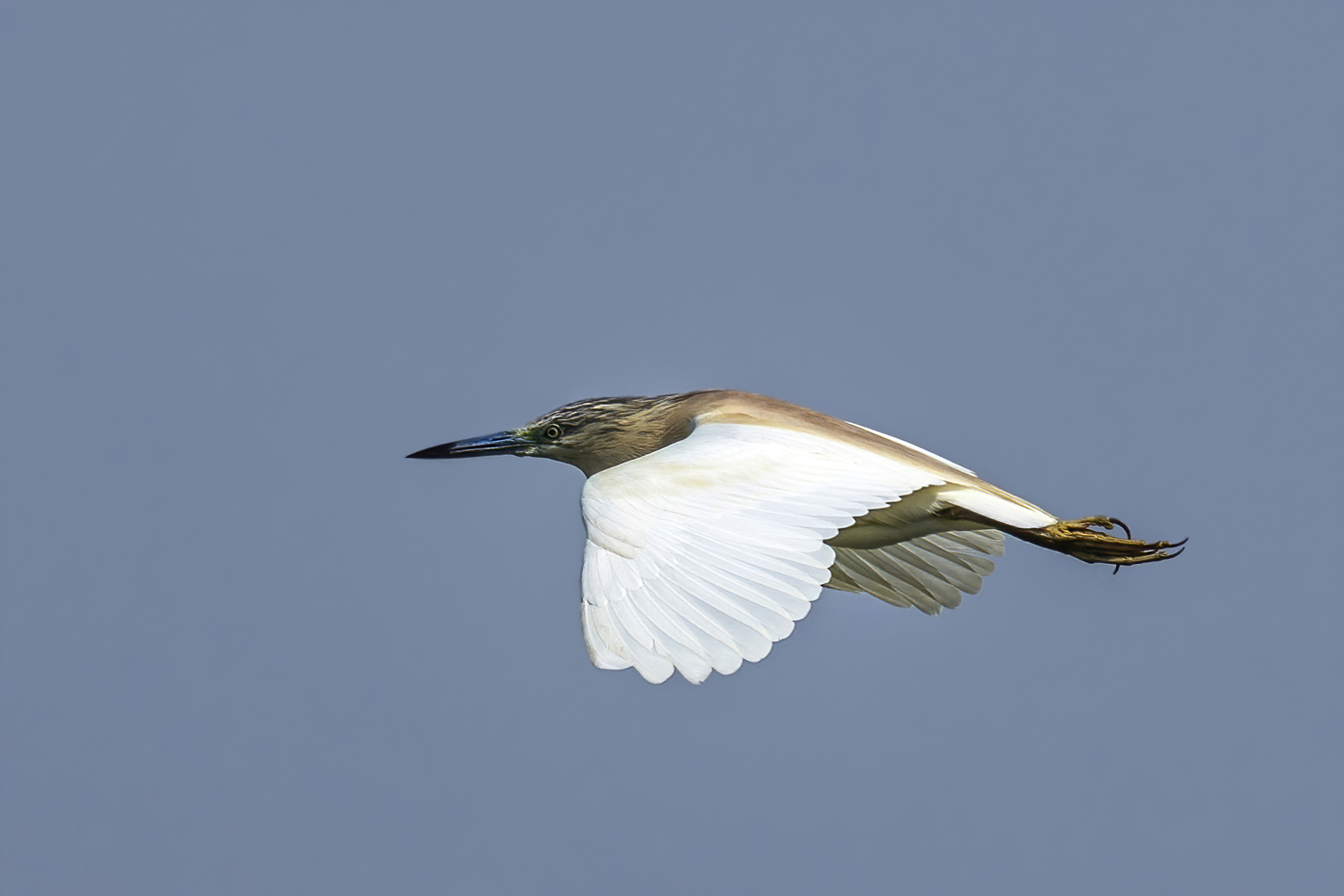
Flying in Cyprus

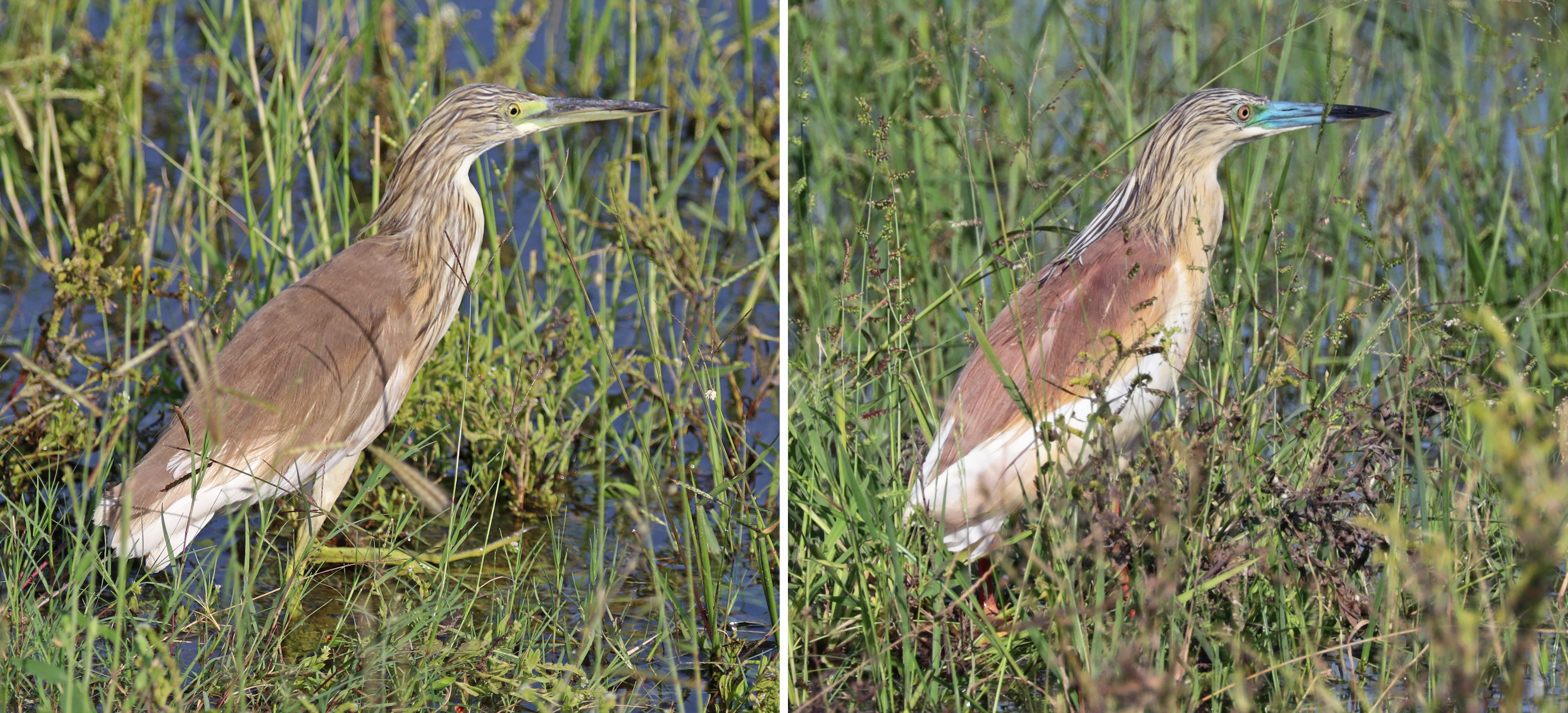
Composite showing changes during breeding

== Etymology ==
The English common name squacco comes via Francis Willughby (c. 1672) quoting a local Italian name sguacco. The current spelling comes from John Hill in 1752.

The scientific name comes from Latin ardeola, a small heron (ardea), and ralloides, from the Latin rallus, meaning a rail and the Greek -oides, "resembling".

== Breeding ==
The squacco heron uses freshwater localities throughout Europe and the Middle East as breeding grounds to later migrate south to the Sub-Saharan African region. Non-breeding squacco herons share similar traits with other heron species like the Indian pond heron and Malagasy pond heron which show tawny color plumage, lighter streaking, smaller bill, and narrower wing tips.

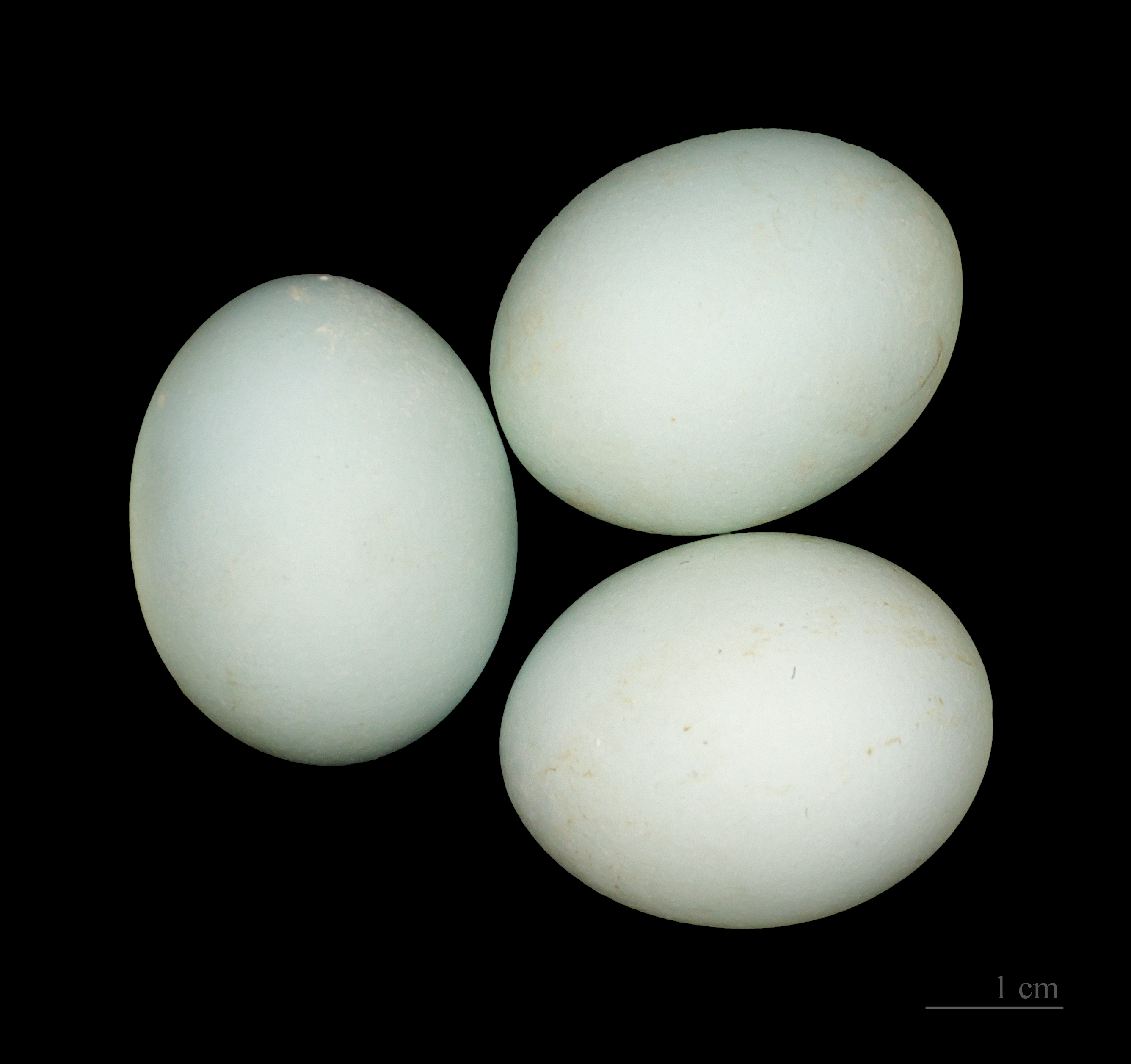
Ardeola ralloides eggs
