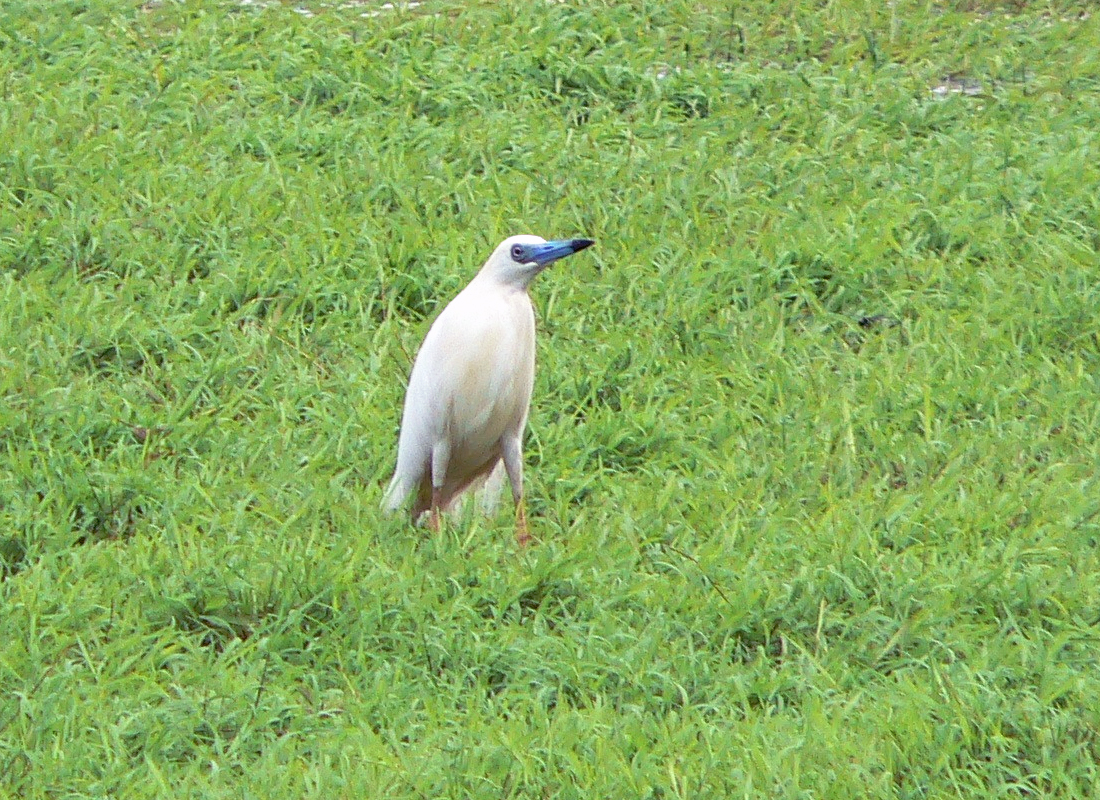

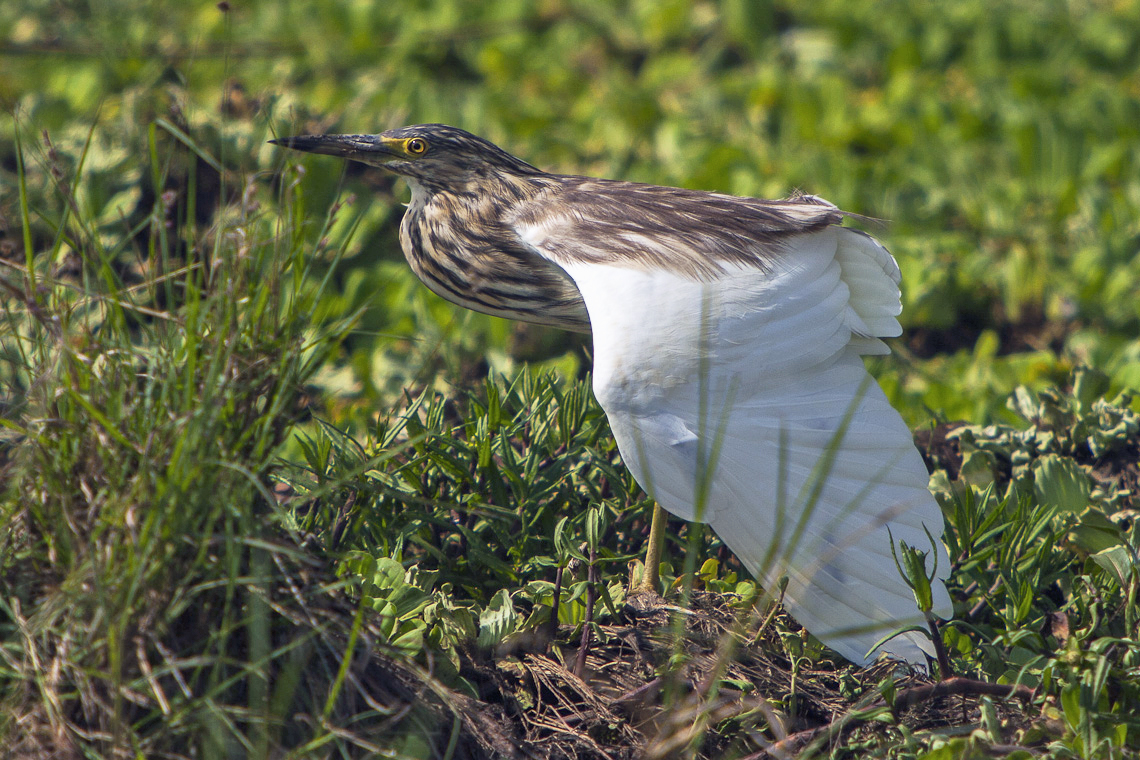
- In breeding plumage (top) and non-breeding plumage (bottom)

Conservation status
- Endangered (IUCN 3.1)

Scientific classification
- Kingdom: Animalia
- Phylum: Chordata
- Class: Aves
- Order: Pelecaniformes
- Family: Ardeidae
- Genus: Ardeola
- Species: A. idae

Binomial name
- Ardeola idae (Hartlaub, 1860)
- Yellow: Breeding range Blue: Non-breeding range

= Malagasy pond heron =

Species of bird

The Malagasy pond heron (Ardeola idae), also known as the Madagascar pond heron or Madagascar squacco heron, is a species of heron of the family Ardeidae. They breed in Madagascar, Réunion and the Seychelles, and spend the non-breeding season in eastern mainland Africa. As of 2021, the population is estimated to number between 1,000 – 2,500 adults and the species is considered endangered.

== Taxonomy ==
The Malagasy pond heron was first described in 1860 by German physician and ornithologist Gustav Hartlaub. The species is monotypic, without distinct subspecies.

== Description ==
Malagasy pond herons grow to 45–50 cm (18–20 in) in height and anywhere from 250–350 g (9–12 oz) in weight. There is not a large variation in weight between the sexes as they are quite similar in bone body structure. feather, eye, and bill colour are determined by life stage (chick, juvenile, and adult) and reproductive status.

The adults appearance can be split into the non-breeding plumage and the breeding stage. When the species is not breeding, the crown and the posterior are a colour mixture of buff and black with brown prominent over the other parts of the body. The bill is predominately green with a black tip whilst the iris is yellow. The flight feathers are clearly seen in flight and for the most part are white. The feathers on the lower mantle and upper scapulars are loosely structured and elongated. Moreover, the lower foreneck feathers are split into fine elongated tips which cover the upper breast.

The primary difference of appearance in the breeding stage is the dominance of a snow white colour over the body a bill of a deep azure blue. When coming out of breeding, an intermediate plumage emerges on the back, and dense plumes sprouting on areas such as the neck and breast.

Prior to adulthood, the Malagasy pond heron will possess a juvenile plumage just before leaving the nest, lasting a few weeks. The juvenile differs from the adult in having a dull orange bill and pale green eyes. The one distinguishing feature of the chick is its thick buff yellow down.

== Vocalisation ==
As they often hide in trees and shrubs at the sight of a human disturbance, distinguishing calls between species is often difficult. The Malagasy pond heron possesses two calls: a flight call and a burr call. The flight call has a duration of 0.5 s and is used at 5 second intervals as a means to keep distances between other birds in flight. The burr call is used when rival herons approach the nest.

== Distribution and habitat ==
The Malagasy pond herons breed in Madagascar, Réunion and the Seychelles. During the non-breeding season, they migrate to eastern mainland Africa, in Kenya, Tanzania, Uganda, Rwanda, Burundi, DR Congo, Malawi, Zambia, Zimbabwe and Mozambique. In Madagascar, some of the locations where commonly observed include Lake Alarobia and Tsimbazaza Park (both near Antananarivo), wetlands around Ampijoroa and at Berenty. As a result, their estimated area of occurrence is 1,050,000 km^{2} (410,000 sq mi). They occupy a broad range of Madagascan habitats that include small grassy marshes, lakes, ponds, streams, and rice fields. Those that populate the Aldabra region are commonly located in mangroves, inland pools, and lagoon shores. It can be found from sea level to elevation levels up to 1,800 metres (6,000 ft).

== Behaviour ==
One of the key behavioural habits of the Malagasy pond heron is its yearly migratory pattern. It migrates from Madagascar to the eastern mainland of Africa in May and journeys back to its breeding range in October. Those that have not matured into adult life remain in the non-breeding areas, as there is no benefit in travelling to the breeding zone.

In terms of interaction, this species is very territorial and communication with other rival birds is limited. As such, they will remain at least 10 m (30 ft) apart if nesting or in flight due to their inconspicuous nature. One observation found two Malagasy pond herons fighting, grasping at each other's bills in the motion of flight. In Africa, instances such as this are scarce as there is rarely more than two on the same body of water.

Nesting tends to be done along the coast and foraging for food is performed well inland, away from the nests. In fact, the closest that an individual heron will get to another apart from breeding is during roosting in their nests. Habitat degradation has resulted in closer roosting and has become integrated with other heron species such as cattle egrets and squacco herons.

== Diet ==
There is very limited knowledge on the feeding habits of the Madagascan pond heron, but it is thought to feed mostly on fishes, aquatic insects and small invertebrates. They may opportunistically eat crustaceans, frogs, toads, mollusks (snails, slugs, etc.), worms, caterpillars (and other larval insects), and even terrestrial reptiles, such as pygmy or juvenile chameleons, skinks and geckos. A small study, of a single Malagasy heron in Madagascar, showed a varied diet that included fish, crustaceans, frogs, dragonflies, beetles and grasshoppers. Amphibians are, for the most part, absent on islands such as Aldabra and Mayotte, so feeding on them is not necessarily an option in those locations.

== Threats ==
The main threat for survival of this species is the continual loss of habitat due to the clearing, drainage, and conversion of their wetland environments to rice fields. Moreover, the exploitation of eggs and young is prevalent at many of the breeding sites poses generational problems. As a result, their population has declined dramatically over the last 50 years. However, a recently established resource management process labelled GELOSE has helped significantly decrease activity in this species habitat.

An equally dangerous threat to their survival is competition with the squacco heron, which is spreading vigorously and seems to be more adaptable to man-made structures and icons that encroach on their habitat. This form of heron greatly outnumbers the Malagasy pond heron in Madagascar and appears to have increased while endemic species has declined. Although they are vastly outnumbered, the Malagasy pond heron is presumed to dominate in the interspecific interactions.

== Breeding ==
The breeding of the Malagasy pond heron is colonial, meaning that a large congregation occurs at a particular location for mating. However, both colony size and location numbers have dwindled over the past thirty years. Colony size has dropped from 700 individuals to around 50 whilst breeding locations are limited to only a few colony sites. In Madagascar, colonies are located in phragmite reedbeds, typha, papyrus and Cyprus stands with coastal islands also being of extreme importance. Moreover, breeding in Madagascar has resulted in a mixed colony of heron species that include the black-crowned night heron, little egret, cattle egret, great egret, and the squacco heron. The largest colony of the Malagasy pond heron on record was around 500 pairs in Imerimanjaka Cyperus marsh, near Antananarivo. These 500 pairs were also mixed with 1,500 pairs of squacco herons, resulting in the largest breeding colony of African herons in 1940. Unfortunately, current day pairs usually never exceed 10.

Like many other bird species, the Malagasy pond heron faces an abundance of predators and as such must nest in trees and bushes in hard-to-access ponds and marshes. The main predator of this heron include the various species of crocodile that inhabit the range and also snakes, should they grow large enough. To ward off ground threats, the breeding nests are built 1 to 4 metres above the ground. Should the population colony be mixed with other avian species, they will always occupy the higher nests.

Breeding usually starts in the month of October and can extend through to March should the heron be able to lay two clutches. On the coral atoll of Aldabra, breeding increases markedly when the rains arrive during November and December. Whilst the Malagasy pond heron has a large range of habitat, it will only breed in Madagascar and the aforementioned Aldabra. In Madagascar, the area to the west near Antananarivo is the preferred breeding location whereas the nature conservation sites of Ile aux Aigrettes and Ile aux Cedres of Aldabra are used.

Successful breeding usually results from appropriate courtship displays, which include features such as aerial chases, duets, and crest raising. The incubation period is similar across all the breeding ranges and lasts anywhere from 21–25 days. Normal young possess a green down which can be observed about 2 weeks after hatching, which is when they leave the nest for the first time.

== Conservation status ==
The conservation status of the Malagasy pond heron has changed dramatically over the last few decades. In 1988, this species was classified as near threatened according to IUCN's red list, but continued pressure on the population resulted in a move to the vulnerable category in 2000. In 2016, it was further upgraded to endangered. The main threats are collection of eggs and young at their breeding colonies and degradation of their wetland habitats.
